= Romance copula =

Usage of linking verbs in Romance languages

In some of the Romance languages the copula, the equivalent of the verb to be in English, is relatively complex compared to its counterparts in other languages. A copula is a word that links the subject of a sentence with a predicate (a subject complement). Whereas English has one main copula verb (and some languages like Russian mostly express the copula implicitly) some Romance languages have more complex forms.

Italian, Portuguese, Spanish, and some other Romance languages have more than one copula verb. Conversely, French and certain others have only one. The development of copula verbs in Romance languages is explained by the fact that these are ultimately derived from three Latin verbs:

- esse "to be" (ultimately from Proto-Indo-European *h₁es-, as in English is). The verb esse was an irregular, suppletive verb, with some of its forms (e.g. fuī "I was/I have been") taken from the Proto-Indo-European root *bʰuH- meaning "to become" (as in English be).
- stāre "to stand" or "to stay" (ultimately from Proto-Indo-European *steh₂-, as in English stand and German stehen).
- sedēre "to sit" (ultimately from Proto-Indo-European *sed-, as in English sit).

As the Romance languages developed over time, the three separate Latin verbs became just one or two verbs in the Romance languages.

The reduction of three separate verbs into just one or two appears to have occurred as follows:

- The irregular infinitive esse was remodeled into *essere.
- *essere and sedēre forms sounded similar in Latin once the latter reduced to *seēre, and sounded even more similar after stress shifted in Spanish infinitives to the penultimate vowel. As a result, parts of the conjugations of erstwhile sedēre were subject to being integrated into conjugation paradigms associated with *essere, eventually ser.
- stāre itself remained a separate verb, but stāre (later *istāre) and *essere were similar in some meanings, so that, especially in the Western Romance languages, stāre evolved into a second copula, with a meaning of "to be (temporarily or incidentally)"; *essere was then narrowed to mean "to be (permanently or essentially)".

The development of two copular verbs in this manner occurred most completely in Spanish, Portuguese and Catalan. In other languages, most usages of English "to be" are still translated by *essere:

- In Italian, the infinitive essere continues Latin esse as existential 'to be', while stare has the primary meaning "to stay" and is used as a copula only in a few situations: to express one's state of physical health (sto bene "I am well"); to form progressive aspects (sto parlando "I am speaking"); and (especially in the south of Italy) with the meaning of "to be located", although a distinction can be expressed in most varieties of Italian: è in cucina 'it's in the kitchen (where it usually is)' versus sta in cucina 'it's in the kitchen (where it isn't usually located)'.
- In Old French, the verb ester < stāre maintained the Proto-Romance meaning of "to stand, stay, stop". In modern French, this verb has almost totally disappeared (see below for the one exception), although the derivative verb of rester ("to remain") exists, and some parts of the conjugation of ester have become incorporated into être "to be" < *essere. As a result of this complex evolution, even though French has a single verb for "to be" (être), its conjugation is highly irregular.

== History ==
In English, it is possible to say "there stands..." instead of "there is..." in certain contexts. In Latin, too, it became common to eschew svm in favour of sto and say where things "stood" instead of where they "were". With time, it became common to use this verb to express other states.

Today, Ibero-Romance languages, Catalan, and (to a lesser extent) Italian commonly use two copulas, one from each of the Latin verbs. The others use just one main copula, from svm.

There is also a notable tendency for a derivative of the supine of sto (statvs, stata, statvm) to replace the past participle of verbs deriving from svm (which in Latin had no supine). Examples:

- Italian has stato as the past participle of not only stare but also essere, instead of the expected essuto (which, along with suto, we encounter only in mediaeval texts).
- Standard Catalan has estat as the past participle of not only estar but also ésser. However, many people use forms such as sigut or sét, which are considered also standard for colloquial speech.
- French has été as the past participle of être, which had a complex phonetic development like many words of the language: statvm → /sˈtatu/ (Vulgar Latin) > /esˈtæðo/ (Proto-Gallo-Romance) > /esˈteθ/ (early Old French) > /ehˈte/ (late Old French) > /eːˈte/ (Middle French) > /ete/ (Modern French).

Notes

- Following the standard practice, Latin verbs are quoted here in the first person singular of the present indicative. In other words, svm is literally "I am", rather than "to be". Their infinitives were esse and stare.
- Although it is normal to use lower case when writing Latin in modern times, this article, dealing as it does with etymology, presents Latin in the capital letters used by the Romans, and modern innovations such as j, u, ligatures, macrons, and breves have been avoided.
- Only the basic simple tenses are given in the conjugation tables, but all languages below have also numerous compound tenses.
- The asterisk (*) indicates an incorrect or unattested form.

== Spanish ==
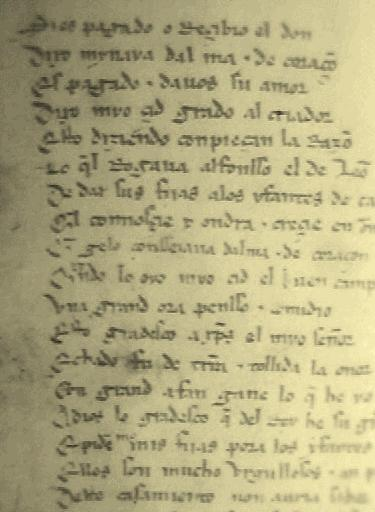
Page of the Cantar de Mio Cid. The third line reads: Es pagado, e davos su amor.

=== Spanish copulas ===
The Spanish copulas are ser and estar. The latter developed as follows:

stare → *estare → estar

The copula ser developed from two Latin verbs. Thus its inflectional paradigm is a combination: most of it derives from svm (to be) but the present subjunctive appears to come from sedeo (to sit) via the Old Spanish verb seer.

E.g. derivation from sedeo:

sedeam → sea (1st person singular, present tense, subjunctive mood)

Derivation from svm:

svmvs → somos (1st person plural, present tense, indicative mood)

The infinitive (on which the modern future and conditional are based) could have derived from either or both:

esse → èssere (as in Italian) → ésser (as in Catalan) → ser
sedere → *seder → seer → ser

In the early part of the second millennium, in texts such as the Cantar de Mio Cid, ser was still used mostly as in Latin, and there was little place for estar; sentences like Es pagado, e davos su amor, "He is satisfied, and he gives you his favour" are found, where modern Spanish might have Queda contento, or Está satisfecho, y le da su favor.

As the centuries went by, estar spread in use. Today, ser is used to express the fundamental nature, identity, essence, or characteristics of something – what it really is, while estar expresses the state or condition something happens to be in. Indeed, ser is etymologically related to the English words "essence" and "is", and estar with "state", "status", "standing", "stance" and "stay". The distinction is parallel with the concept of essence versus accident.

The verb quedar (which also has the specific meanings of "to remain", "to be as a result" and others) is often used in a similar way to estar. It derives from the Latin qvieto (qvietare in the infinitive), "to rest".

Ser

Non-finite
Infinitive	ser
Past participle	sido
Gerund	siendo
Person	yo	tú	él	nosotros	vosotros	ellos
Indicative
Present	soy	eres	es	somos	sois	son
Preterite	fui	fuiste	fue	fuimos	fuisteis	fueron
Imperfect	era	eras	era	éramos	erais	eran
Future	seré	serás	será	seremos	seréis	serán
Conditional
	sería	serías	sería	seríamos	seríais	serían
Subjunctive
Present	sea	seas	sea	seamos	seáis	sean
Imperfect	fuera / fuese	fueras / fueses	fuera / fuese	fuéramos / fuésemos	fuerais / fueseis	fueran / fuesen
Future†	fuere	fueres	fuere	fuéremos	fuereis	fueren
Imperative
		sé	sea	seamos	sed	sean

Estar

Non-finite
Infinitive	estar
Past participle	estado
Gerund	estando
Person	yo	tú	él	nosotros	vosotros	ellos
Indicative
Present	estoy	estás	está	estamos	estáis	están
Preterite	estuve	estuviste	estuvo	estuvimos	estuvisteis	estuvieron
Imperfect	estaba	estabas	estaba	estábamos	estabais	estaban
Future	estaré	estarás	estará	estaremos	estaréis	estarán
Conditional
	estaría	estarías	estaría	estaríamos	estaríais	estarían
Subjunctive
Present	esté	estés	esté	estemos	estéis	estén
Imperfect	estuviera / estuviese	estuvieras / estuvieses	estuviera / estuviese	estuviéramos / estuviésemos	estuvierais / estuvieseis	estuvieran / estuviesen
Future†	estuviere	estuvieres	estuviere	estuviéremos	estuviereis	estuvieren
Imperative††
		está		estemos	estad

† Archaic.

†† Estar is usually made reflexive in the imperative.

=== Nuance ===
Él es sucio = "He is dirty" (i.e. "He is a dirty person" – characteristic)
Él está sucio = "He is dirty" (i.e. "He has some dirt on him" – state)

Es abierta = "She is open" (i.e. "She is an open sort of person" – characteristic)
Está abierta = "It is open" (probably referring to a door or window – state)

Es triste = "[It/he/she] is sad" (i.e. gloomy – characteristic)
Está triste = "[It/he/she] is sad" (i.e. feeling down – state)

¿Cómo eres? = "What are you like?" (i.e. "describe yourself" – characteristics)
¿Cómo estás? = "How are you?" (i.e. "how are you doing?" – state)

With adjectives referring to beauty and the like, ser means "to be", and estar means "to look".

¡Qué bonita es! = "Wow, she is so beautiful" (characteristic)
¡Qué bonita está! = "Wow, she is looking so beautiful / she is done up so nicely" (state)

The differentiation between "nature" and "state" makes sense when talking about the states of life and death: Él está vivo (He is alive), Él está muerto (He is dead). Estar is used for both alive and dead, since they are both states, although being dead is considered a permanent state.

Ser is used when stating the stage of life at which a person is. The old, the young, etc. are seen as groups that one can belong to. It is a question of identity:

Él es viejo = "He is old"
Él es un viejo = "He is an old man"
Cuando ella era niñita = "When she was a little girl"

However, age can also be presented not as a matter of identity but a state:

Él está viejo = "He is looking old" / "He got old"

The use of estar gives a certain special nuance to some verbs. For example, estar guapa, though it has the sense of "to be beautiful", also emphasizes the use of make-up and clothes to create a beautiful look. Ser sucio instead of the more usual estar sucio means to be the sort of person who is likely to be dirty.

The adjective loco ("mad", "crazy", "insane") is always used with estar in Spain, as the implication is that the person "has gone mad" (i.e. a change of state). It is possible to give it a permanent nuance, but only by using it as a noun: Él es un loco, "He is a madman". Ser loco is used in certain regions in Latin America, however, meaning a permanent insanity as opposed to estar loco meaning have gone mad or acting crazy.

The expression como una cabra (with the implied loco omitted) is used with estar to mean "mad as a hatter", "crazy as a loon". Ser como una cabra would literally mean, "to be like a goat".

Ser is used with adjectives of fundamental belief, nationality, sex, intelligence, etc. The use of estar with francés ("French") would sound quite odd to native Spanish speakers, as though it meant, "to feel a bit French". Similarly, no estar católico does not mean, "to no longer be Catholic", but is a colloquial expression meaning "to feel under the weather".

It is often stated that the difference between the two verbs corresponds to "permanent" versus "temporary", but it is more accurate to describe the distinction as one of "essential nature" versus "state or condition". The "essential nature" of things does sometimes change, and this is reflected in the language. For example, someone who had been depressed for a prolonged period, and then had a life changing experience like a new career or long-term relationship, might say ahora yo soy feliz, meaning, "now I am happy".

=== Specific constructions requiring ser ===
A special use of ser, which expresses neither a nature nor a state but an action, is the formation of the passive voice:

Ellos han sido asesinados = "They have been murdered"
Tú serás juzgada = "You will be judged"

=== Specific constructions requiring estar ===
==== Past participles ====
Estar is usually used with adjectives that derive from past participles of verbs since the use of ser would sound like a verb in the passive voice. Such adjectives in any case generally refer to states:

La frontera está cerrada = "The border is closed"
Estoy casado = "I am married" (Soy casado is also possible; "I am single", "I am widowed", etc. can use ser or estar as well)

A special example of this tendency is what happens with words indicating prohibition and suchlike. If an adjective not deriving from a verb were used, then the meaning would definitely require ser. To say the same thing with a past participle, estar (or quedar) is required, in order to differentiate it from the use of ser with a past participle implying an action expressed in the passive voice:

Es ilegal fumar en este vuelo = "It is illegal to smoke on this flight" (straightforward case of ser)
Está prohibido fumar en este vuelo = "It is prohibited to smoke on this flight" (estar necessary to distinguish the sentence from the following one)
Ha sido prohibido fumar en este vuelo = "It has been prohibited (i.e. made against the rules) to smoke on this flight" (This is an example of the passive voice. This use of ser in the perfect tense is similar to the use of estar in the present tense; the former expressing an event in the past, the latter expressing its current effect.)

This fine nuance is not encountered in other Romance languages, which do not go to such lengths to distinguish between passives and similar-sounding phrases.

==== Location ====
Estar is used to refer to physical location. In Spanish, location is regarded as a state, and therefore is indicated with estar, even in those cases (e.g. Madrid está en España "Madrid is in Spain") when one might think that it is something so permanent and fundamental that it could be logical to use ser. The use of estar for location may be easier for English speakers to grasp if they recall that it is derived from Latin stare, "to stand."

With immobile things, quedar is sometimes used instead of estar, especially when there is a reference to a length of time, or a remaining distance, e.g.:

¿A cuánto queda la playa? / ¿A qué distancia queda la playa? = "How far away is the beach?"
Aún queda lejos = "There is still quite some way" / "It is still far"
El bar queda a cinco minutitos = "The bar is five minutes away"

However, ser can sometimes occur with words such as aquí, which can mislead learners into thinking that physical location can be expressed with ser. In fact, the verb in this case identifies the place rather than expressing where it is. For example, one might say to a taxi driver the following phrases, to indicate that one has arrived:

Está aquí = "It is here"
Es aquí = "It is here"

The difference becomes clear if aquí is changed to esta calle:

Está en esta calle = "It is in this street"
Es esta calle = "It is this street"

Es aquí and es esta calle express the idea that "this is the place", a concept quite different from what is expressed by estar.

The only case in which true location is expressed by ser is when an event rather than a physical thing is referred to:

¿Dónde es la fiesta? = "Where is the party?"
¿Dónde está la discoteca? = "Where is the nightclub?"

=== Words requiring ser ===
Ser is always used when the complement is a noun or pronoun, regardless of whether the speaker intended to express a fundamental essence (though in practice speakers do tend to express this):

Él es una persona sucia = "He is a dirty person"
Ella es una persona abierta = "She is an open person"
Yo soy la víctima = "I am the victim"

However, it is not always easy to know what is a noun. For example, pez is a noun meaning "fish", but estar pez is a colloquial expression meaning "not to have a clue" or "to be at sea" at a given activity.

=== Words requiring estar ===
Estar must be used when the complement is bien or mal, no matter what meaning is intended.

Este libro está muy bien = Este libro es muy bueno = "This book is very good" (nature)
Estoy muy mal = Estoy muy malo = "I am feeling terrible, ill" (state)

=== Total change of meaning with specific adjectives ===
Many adjectives change in meaning entirely depending on the verb used, sometimes meaning almost the opposite. In each case, the meaning which is more of a "nature" goes with ser and the meaning which is more of a "state" goes with estar.

adjective	with estar	with ser
aburrido	bored	boring
bueno	tasty, sexy	good
cachondo	aroused	sexy, funny person
cansado	tired	tiring/tiresome
listo	ready	clever, smart
rico	delicious	rich, wealthy
seguro	sure/certain	safe
vivo	alive	lively, bright

==== Happiness ====
Although "sadness" is expressed straightforwardly with estar triste, "happiness" is a little trickier. The quality of being joyous, lively and happy is expressed with ser alegre. This can describe people, music, colours, etc. Estar alegre expresses the state of being merry, which in practice may sometimes mean "drunk", "tipsy".

A person who is fundamentally happy in life is said to ser feliz; indeed la felicidad is that "happiness" for which humans strive. This happiness often turns out to be a transitory state, a person may nevertheless declare yo soy feliz as a statement of optimism that goes beyond the description of today's mood that is expressed by any phrase with estar. As for such moods, they can be expressed with estar feliz.

When not a state but a change of state is referred to, the expression is quedar contento or alegrarse: Ella quedó muy contenta cuando yo le dije que ella había ganado = "she was very glad when I told her that she had won"; Yo me alegro de que vosotros hayáis llegado = "I am glad that you (plural) have come".

In the excerpt from the Cantar de Mio Cid above, one can see that "to be happy" a thousand years ago was ser pagado (meaning "to be paid" in current Spanish).

== Portuguese ==
=== Portuguese copulas ===
The Portuguese copulas are ser and estar. As in Spanish, estar derived from Latin sto / stare:

stare → *estare → estar

The copula ser developed both from svm and sedeo. Thus its inflectional paradigm is a combination of these two Latin verbs: most tenses derive from svm and a few from sedeo. E.g. derivation from sedeo:

sedere → seer → ser (infinitive)
sedeam → seja (1st person singular, present tense, subjunctive mood)

E.g. derivation from svm:

svm → som → sou (1st pers. sing., present tense, indicative mood)
eram → era (1st pers. sing., imperfect past tense, indicative mood)
fvi → fui (1st pers. sing., preterite tense, indicative mood)

Ser

Non-finite
(Impersonal) infinitive	ser
Past participle	sido
Gerund	sendo
Person	eu	tu	ele	nós	vós	eles
Personal infinitive	ser	seres	ser	sermos	serdes	serem
Indicative
Present	sou	és	é	somos	sois	são
Preterite	fui	foste	foi	fomos	fostes	foram
Imperfect	era	eras	era	éramos	éreis	eram
Pluperfect†	fora	foras	fora	fôramos	fôreis	foram
Future	serei	serás	será	seremos	sereis	serão
Conditional
	seria	serias	seria	seríamos	seríeis	seriam
Subjunctive
Present	seja	sejas	seja	sejamos	sejais	sejam
Imperfect	fosse	fosses	fosse	fôssemos	fôsseis	fossem
Future	for	fores	for	formos	fordes	forem
Imperative
Present		sê			sede

Estar

Non-finite
(Impersonal) infinitive	estar
Past participle	estado
Gerund	estando
Person	eu	tu	ele	nós	vós	eles
Personal infinitive	estar	estares	estar	estarmos	estardes	estarem
Indicative
Present	estou	estás	está	estamos	estais	estão
Preterite	estive	estiveste	esteve	estivemos	estivestes	estiveram
Imperfect	estava	estavas	estava	estávamos	estáveis	estavam
Pluperfect†	estivera	estiveras	estivera	estivéramos	estivéreis	estiveram
Future	estarei	estarás	estará	estaremos	estareis	estarão
Conditional
	estaria	estarias	estaria	estaríamos	estaríeis	estariam
Subjunctive
Present	esteja	estejas	esteja	estejamos	estejais	estejam
Imperfect	estivesse	estivesses	estivesse	estivéssemos	estivésseis	estivessem
Future	estiver	estiveres	estiver	estivermos	estiverdes	estiverem
Imperative
Present		está			estai

† Mostly literary.

†† Some authors regard the conditional as a tense of the indicative mood.

=== Usage ===
The distinction between the two verbs is very similar to that of Catalan. Compared to Spanish, estar is a little less used. The main difference between Spanish and Portuguese lies in the interpretation of the concept of state versus essence and in the generalisations in some constructions. There is perhaps a little more of a concept of permanent versus temporary, rather than essence versus state. For example, unlike Spanish, Portuguese does not require estar with past participles; in this case, it follows the general rule regarding state/essence.

A cadeira é [feita] de madeira = "The chair is made of wood".

The word feita, "made", is usually omitted.

Eu sou casado = "I am married".

The same applies to sentences expressing interdictions:

É proibido fumar neste voo "Smoking is forbidden on this flight".

However, there are some nuances in these verbs in the passive voice. In this case, the use of ser or estar depends on the tense of the verb. E.g.: to say that somebody is not allowed to smoke, only estar can be used in the present tense:

Está proibido de fumar [pelo pai] = "He has been forbidden from smoking [by his father]"; literally "He is forbidden to smoke [by the father]".

In past tenses, both ser and estar can be used, conveying a different meaning:

Foi proibido de fumar = "He was forbidden from smoking" [action].
Estava proibido de fumar = "He was forbidden from smoking" [result].

Portuguese counts location as permanent and fundamental, and accordingly uses ser, or the more specific secondary copula ficar (to stay), from Latin figo, "to place/set":

Lisboa fica em Portugal "Lisbon is [located] in Portugal".
Onde é/fica o apartamento dela? "Where is her flat/apartment?"

but:

A cidade está (situada) a 10 quilômetros da capital. "The city is (situated) 10 km from the capital."

==== Nuance ====
Como és? = "What are you like?" (i.e. "Describe yourself" – characteristics).
Como estás? = "How are you?" (i.e. "How are you doing?" – state).

Ele é triste = "He is sad" (i.e. gloomy – characteristic).
(Ele) está triste = "He is [feeling] sad" (i.e. feeling down – state).

Ela é aberta = "She is open" (i.e. "She is an open-minded sort of person" – characteristic; this sentence can also have a pejorative meaning).
Ela está aberta = "It is open" (probably referring to a door or window – state).

É sujo = "It is dirty" (i.e. "It is a dirty place/thing" – characteristic).
Está sujo = "It is dirty" (i.e. "The place is/looks dirty [now]" – state).

With adjectives referring to beauty and the like, ser means "to be", and estar means "to look".

Que linda ela é! = "She is so beautiful!" (characteristic).
Que linda ela está! = "She looks so beautiful!" (state).

As in Spanish, the differentiation between "nature" and "state" makes sense when talking about the states of life and death: Está vivo (He is alive); Está morto (He is dead). Notice the important difference between ser morto (to be killed) and estar morto (to be dead):

Ele foi morto [por um ladrão] = "He was killed [by a burglar]".

Louco (mad) can be used with ser or estar, giving different connotations:

És louco! = "You are mad!" (characteristic).
Estás louco! = "You have gone mad!"/ "You are acting crazy" (state).

Ser is used with adjectives expressing:

- fundamental belief: Não sou católico "I am not a Catholic";
- nationality: És português "You are Portuguese";
- gender: É um homem "He is a man";
- intelligence: Somos espertos "We are clever", etc.

Estar católico is used with the same sense as in Spanish:

Eu não estou muito católico = "I am not feeling very well" (perhaps mean-spirited or ill or drunk).
O tempo hoje não está muito católico = "The weather is not very reliable today".

Apart from this exception, due to its different meanings, estar cannot be used for nationality, gender, or intelligence, but one can say Estou abrasileirado (I have acquired Brazilian ways – state) or Estás americanizado (You have been Americanised – state). The same applies for the difference between É um homem "He is a man" and Está um homem, meaning, "He has grown up to be a man".

Ficar, apart from its use as "to stay", and the use mentioned above as a copula translated as "to be located", is extensively used for a change of state (sometimes quite sudden), being translated as "to get" or "to become":

Fiquei rico = "I got rich."
Ficou triste = "He became sad."

== Catalan ==
=== Catalan copulas ===
The Catalan copulas developed as follows:

esse → éssere → ésser → esser → ser
stare → *estare → estar
sedēre → seure

The last three forms of the first verb survive in modern Catalan. Ésser is considered the most standard, followed by ser and, distantly, esser. The verb seure remains as a distinct verb and is not considered a copula.

(És)ser

Non-finite
Infinitive	ser / ésser
Past participle	estat / sigut / sét
Gerund	sent / essent
Person	jo	tu	ell	nosaltres	vosaltres	ells
Indicative
Present	sóc	ets	és	som	sou	són
Preterite	fui	fores	fou	fórem	fóreu	foren
Imperfect	era	eres	era	érem	éreu	eren
Future	seré	seràs	serà	serem	sereu	seran
Conditional
	seria / fóra	series / fores	seria / fóra	seríem / fórem	seríeu / fóreu	serien / foren
Subjunctive
Present	sigui / siga	siguis / sigues	sigui / siga	siguem	sigueu	siguin / siguen
Imperfect	fos	fossis	fos	fóssim / fóssem	fóssiu / fósseu	fossin / fossen
Imperative
		sigues			sigueu / sigau

Estar

Non-finite
Infinitive	estar
Past participle	estat
Gerund	estant
Person	jo	tu	ell	nosaltres	vosaltres	ells
Indicative
Present	estic	estàs	està	estem / estam	esteu / estau	estan
Preterite	estiguí	estigueres	estigué	estiguérem	estiguéreu	estigueren
Imperfect	estava	estaves	estava	estàvem	estàveu	estaven
Future	estaré	estaràs	estarà	estarem	estareu	estaran
Conditional
	estaria	estaries	estaria	estaríem	estaríeu	estarien
Subjunctive
Present	estigui / estiga	estiguis / estigues	estigui / estiga	estiguem	estigueu	estiguin / estiguen
Imperfect	estigués	estiguessis	estigués	estiguéssim / estiguéssem	estiguéssiu / estiguésseu	estiguessin / estiguessen
Imperative
		estigues			estigueu / estigau

=== Usage ===
In Catalan, ésser and estar work in a way intermediate between those of Italian and Portuguese. A complete description of its rules of usage is as follows:

- When referring to inanimate objects, ser is used to tell about either permanent conditions inherent to the object (for example és vermell, "it is red"), unfinished qualities, or non-permanent conditions when there is no implication that there has been or there will be a change in state (for example, la sopa és calenta, "the soup is hot.") Ser is used to talk about a quality of an inanimate object in a given moment (without paying attention to other moments) or exactly the opposite: a quality of an inanimate object which is expected to be true in all moments of the existence of said object. Most uses of past participles as adjectives fall into this category when referring to inanimate objects.
- When referring to inanimate objects, estar is used to tell about non-permanent conditions when there is an implication of a finished change of state, an implication of a state in a known point of an evolution, or a temporal condition which is expected to change. In some way, estar introduces an adverbial sense to adjectives (for example, la sopa està calenta, "the soup is hot", as in "it has come to be hot.") Thus, both using ser and estar is correct in many contexts, but there is a difference in nuance.
- When referring to animate objects, ser is only used to tell about permanent conditions (for example és boig, "he is insane"; és mort, "he is dead.") Things traditionally thought of as permanent conditions also fall under this category, most notably ser casat/da, "to be married", and related terms. Ser is also used with the past participle of some unaccusative verbs such as néixer, which in medieval and dialectal Catalan made their compound tenses with ser.
- When referring to animate objects, estar is only used to tell about non-permanent conditions (for example estàs molt guapa, "you look good" as in "better than usual.")
- With fixed prepositional locutions, estar is most often used (for example, està en perill, "he/she/it is in danger"; està a punt, "he/she/it is ready.")
- When referring to location, ser is used when no time context is given (for example, els llibres són als prestatges, "the books are on the shelves.")
- When referring to location, estar is used when there is a sense of permanence (for example estic a Barcelona, "I live in Barcelona") or of a concrete time lapse (for example hi vam estar dues hores, "we were there for two hours.") In this case, pronominal particles might be added to the verb to emphasise the sentence (for example, ens hi vam estar dues hores.)
- Estar is always used with modal adverbs (for example estic bé, "I am all right").
- Estar is used to form the present continuous form estar + gerund, although some linguists think this is not a genuinely Catalan form, even though it is found on Medieval literature, for example that of Ausiàs March. Another undoubtedly genuine but perhaps too literary form is ser a + infinitive.
- Estat is used as the past participle of not only estar but also èsser/ser by many speakers, and this is considered the universal form. However, many other speakers use a traditional regular past participle of èsser/ser: sigut, which is also accepted as standard in Central Catalan, although many linguists and speakers see it as colloquial. Another accepted form is sét, unlike the Valencian form segut, which causes confusion with the past participle of the verb seure, "to sit."

This can be summed up in five simple rules:

1. Ser is always used to apply adjectives to inanimate objects except if there is a cause or a time lapse given for the condition of the adjective.
2. Estar is always used to apply adjectives to animate objects if it is not a permanent state or characteristic of such animate object. However, there are some things that nowadays can be changed but before could not (or were not expected to), which work like permanent characteristics (for example, nationality, beliefs, sex, looks, being married, degree of intelligence and degree of sanity.) Of course, even those can be expressed with estar if the animate object is acting as if they were his characteristics but they are not, or if the characteristics are more emphasised than usual. For example, és molt socialista, "she/he's a convinced socialist" vs. estàs molt socialista!, "you are being very socialist!"; és molt maca, "she is very beautiful" vs. està molt maca, "she looks very beautiful", as in "better than usual"; és mort, "he is dead" vs. està com mort, "he is acting as if he were dead."
3. Ser is always used for locations except if there is a time lapse given or if the location actually means that someone works or lives in the indicated place.
4. Estar is always used with modal adverbs and equivalents like fixed prepositional locutions.
5. Estar is always used to express a point of an evolution or scale (for example, els termòmetres estan a 20 graus, "thermometers are at 20 degrees.")

"Animate objects" refers mainly to people, animals, and whatever is thought to be sentient (for example, a child playing with a doll will probably treat it as an animate object).

== Italian ==
=== Italian copulas ===
The Italian copulas did not undergo the same development as in other languages, having preserved the Vulgar Latin forms essere and stare.

Essere

Non-finite
Infinitive	essere
Past participle	essuto (archaic) / stato (from stare)
Gerund	essendo
Person	io	tu	egli	noi	voi	essi
Indicative
Present	sono	sei	è	siamo	siete	sono
Past historic	fui	fosti	fu	fummo	foste	furono
Imperfect	ero	eri	era	eravamo	eravate	erano
Future	sarò	sarai	sarà	saremo	sarete	saranno
Conditional
	sarei	saresti	sarebbe	saremmo	sareste	sarebbero
Subjunctive
Present	sia	sia	sia	siamo	siate	siano
Imperfect	fossi	fossi	fosse	fossimo	foste	fossero
Imperative
		sii			siate

Stare

Non-finite
Infinitive	stare
Past participle	stato
Gerund	stando
Person	io	tu	egli	noi	voi	essi
Indicative
Present	sto	stai	sta	stiamo	state	stanno
Past historic	stetti	stesti	stette	stemmo	steste	stettero
Imperfect	stavo	stavi	stava	stavamo	stavate	stavano
Future	starò	starai	starà	staremo	starete	staranno
Conditional
	starei	staresti	starebbe	staremmo	stareste	starebbero
Subjunctive
Present	stia	stia	stia	stiamo	stiate	stiano
Imperfect	stessi	stessi	stesse	stessimo	steste	stessero
Imperative
		sta			state

=== Usage ===
Essere is the main copula. Stare refers to state rather than essence, but more narrowly than in Spanish. Essere is used for almost all cases in which English uses "to be". It therefore makes sense to concentrate on the few uses of stare.

- Stare means "to be", "to be feeling", or "to appear" with bene, male, meglio, come?, etc.: Come stai? "How are you?", Sto bene "I am well."
- Stare is used to form continuous forms of tenses: sto aspettando "I am waiting", Stavo parlando con... "I was speaking with..."
- Stare's past participle stato has replaced that of essere, and so stato is used for "been" in all senses.
- Starci (lit. To stay in it) means "to fit" or "to assent to a proposal."
- Stare can be an alternative to restare "to stay."
- Stare is occasionally "to be located." This is very common in the south of Italy for both transient and durable location, but only for durable location in the North. "Sta a Napoli" means "He/she is in Naples" in the South but "He/she lives in Naples" in the North.

Like the Spanish quedar, Italian uses rimanere, from Latin remaneo (both meaning "to remain"), in the sense of "to be as a result"; e.g. È rimasta incinta = "she became pregnant (as a result)".

== Sicilian ==
=== Sicilian copulas ===
The Sicilian copulas developed as follows:

esse → èssere → (es)sere → siri
stare → stare → stari

Siri

Non-finite
Infinitive	siri
Past participle	statu
Gerund	sennu
Person	eu	tu	iddhu	nuiàvutri	vuiàvutri	iddhi
Indicative
Present	sugnu	sì	esti	simu	siti	sù
Preterite	fui	fusti	fu	fumu	fùstivu	furu
Imperfect	era	eri	era	èramu	èravu	èranu
Conditional
	fora	fori	fora	fòramu	fòravu	fòranu
Subjunctive
Present/Imperfect	fussi	fussi	fussi	fùssimu	fùssivu	fùssiru
Imperative
		sì			siti

Stari

Non-finite
Infinitive	stari
Past participle	statu
Gerund	stannu
Person	eu	tu	iddhu	nuiàvutri	vuiàvutri	iddhi
Indicative
Present	staiu	stai	sta	stamu	stati	stannu
Preterite	stesi	stasti	stesi	stèsimu	stàsivu	stèsiru
Imperfect	stava	stavi	stava	stàvamu	stàstivu	stàvanu
Subjunctive
Present/Imperfect	stassi	stassi	stassi	stàssimu	stàssivu	stàssiru
Imperative
		stai			stati

Notes

1. The simple future is no longer in use.
2. The conditional tense of stari has also fallen into disuse.

=== Usage ===
In Sicilian, the meanings and usages of these two copulas are not as broad as in the other languages. Siri is the dominant copula, even more so than in the other Romance languages and is used for almost all cases in which English uses “to be”. Stari has been relegated to only a few common uses:

- Stari is used in combination with the gerund to form the progressive aspect: staiu parrannu = "I am speaking".
- Stari’s past participle, statu, replaced that of siri and thus statu is used for “been” in all senses.
- Stari has also replaced all other words meaning, "to reside": staiu nnê Stati Uniti = "I live in the United States".
- Stari, in combination with addritta, is also used to mean, “to stand up”.
- Stari in combination with the preposition pi can comport two meanings,
  - 1) when followed by a verb it means “about to” or “ready to”: staiu pi jiri = "I am about to go", "I am leaving"; and
  - 2) in reference to an abbreviation, it means, “to stand for”: «USA» sta pi Stati Uniti di Mèrica = "'USA' stands for United States of America."
- Stari-cci, most likely an Italianism, is sometimes used to mean, “to fit”: stu vistutu mi sta? = "does this suit fit me [well]?" (cf. Italian non ci sto 'I don't fit in here/there').

Siri is no longer in use as an auxiliary verb. Aviri has completely replaced it in all verbs.

== Occitan ==
Occitan has just one copula, estre; which is also written èsser, ester, estar in diverse dialects.

Estre

Non-finite
Infinitive	estre, èsser
Past participle	estat, estada, -s
Gerund	essent
Person	ièu	tu	el	nos	vos	els
Indicative
Present	soi	sès	es	sèm	sètz	son
Preterite	foguèri	foguères	foguèt	foguèrem	foguèretz	foguèron
Imperfect	èri	èras	èra	èram	èratz	èran
Future	serai	seràs	serà	serem	seretz	seràn
Conditional	seriá	seriás	seriá	seriam	seriatz	serián
Subjunctive
Present	siá	siás	siá	siam	siatz	sián
Imperfect	foguèsse	foguèsses	foguèsse	foguèssem	foguèssetz	foguèsson
Future†
Imperative
		siá!		siam!	siatz!

== French ==
Modern French has only one copula. Old French, however, had estre (esse → essere → *essre → estre) and ester (stare → *estare → estar → ester). The latter meant to ‘stand’, ‘stay’ or ‘stop’, and might have been used as a copula in a similar way to other Romance languages. With phonetic evolution, the forms of each verb tended to be confused with one another, with the result that estre finally absorbed ester; around the same time, most words beginning with est- changed to ét- or êt-. The modern form of the verb is être.

The only clear traces of ester (or éter if we bear in mind the loss of the s) in the modern copula are the past participle and the imperfect. Instead of the *étu one would expect, we find été – just what we would expect from ester/éter. The same tendency to use past participles derived from statvm (the supine of sto) to replace the past participles of the main copula is also seen in Italian and Catalan. The Old French imperfect was iere (from Latin eram); this was replaced in Middle French by the imperfect of ester, which was estois (from Vulgar Latin *estaba, Latin stābam).

The present participle and all imperfect forms of être are regular and correspond to what one would expect for a verb with the stem êt-; however, they could also be considered as deriving from éter since the forms coincide.

All other forms of être are from svm rather than sto.

Ester also survives in the infinitive in the set phrases ester en justice and ester en jugement, which translate the Latin term stare in ivdicio meaning "to appear in court", "to stand before the court". Ester en justice has come to mean, "to act in a lawsuit", i.e. to appear in court as a party. This is a highly defective verb and mostly exists in the infinitive, although present and past participle are infrequently used as well.

Être

Non-finite
Infinitive	être
Past participle	été
Gerund	étant
Person	je	tu	il	nous	vous	ils
Indicative
Present	suis	es	est	sommes	êtes	sont
Past historic†	fus	fus	fut	fûmes	fûtes	furent
Imperfect	étais	étais	était	étions	étiez	étaient
Future	serai	seras	sera	serons	serez	seront
Conditional
	serais	serais	serait	serions	seriez	seraient
Subjunctive
Present	sois	sois	soit	soyons	soyez	soient
Imperfect†	fusse	fusses	fût	fussions	fussiez	fussent
Imperative
		sois		soyons	soyez

† Literary.

== Romansh ==
Romansh has just one copula, esser. Star means, "to reside".

Esser

Non-finite
Infinitive	esser
Past participle	stà
Gerund	essend / siond
Person	jau	ti	el	nus	vus	els
Indicative
Present	sun	es	è	essan	essas	èn
Imperfect	era	eras	era	eran	eras	eran
Conditional
	fiss	fissas	fiss	fissan	fissas	fissan
Subjunctive
Present	saja	sajas	saja	sajan	sajas	sajan
Imperative
		saja			sajas

== Romanian ==
A fi, fire is the copula in Romanian. These infinitive forms evolved from the passive verb fieri, "to become", "to be made":

fieri → fiere → fire → *fir → fi (fire)

In Latin fieri was used suppletively as the passive voice of facere "to do", "to make". However, in the Vulgar Latin dialects spoken in modern-day Romania, its evolved form fiere replaced essere, maybe due to the similarity between the stems fi- of fieri and fu- of esse (which is not coincidental, as both stems descend from the Proto-Indo-European verb *bʰuH-).

Other forms of the verb a fi are derived from esse: sunt, ești, e(ste), suntem, sunteți, sunt in the present tense and eram, erai, era, eram, erați, erau in the imperfect.

A sta (stare) (stare → sta) means "to stay" or even "to stand", "to stand still" or "to dwell/reside" e.g. a sta in picioare, as in Italian stare in piedi or unde stai? – "where do you live/reside?"

A fi

Non-finite
Infinitive	a fi, fire
Past participle	fost
Gerund	fiind
Person	eu	tu	el	noi	voi	ei
Indicative
Present	sunt	ești	e(ste)	suntem	sunteți	sunt
Preterite	fusei / fui	fuseși / fuși	fuse / fu	fuserăm / furăm	fuserăți / furăți	fuseră / fură
Imperfect	eram	erai	era	eram	erați	erau
Pluperfect	fusesem	fuseseși	fusese	fuseserăm	fuseserăți	fuseseră
Subjunctive
Present	să fiu	să fii	să fie	să fim	să fiți	să fie
Imperative
		fii			fiți

== Sources of the Romance copula ==
=== svm ===
Non-finite
Present Infinitive	esse		Perfect Infinitive		fvisse
Future participle	fvtvrvs		Future Infinitive		fore (fvtvrvm esse)
Person	ego	tu	-†	nos	vos	-†
Indicative
Present	svm	es	est	svmvs	estis	svnt
Perfect	fvi	fvisti	fvit	fvimvs	fvistis	fvervnt
Imperfect	eram	eras	erat	eramvs	eratis	erant
Pluperfect	fveram	fveras	fverat	fveramvs	fveratis	fverant
Future	ero	eris	erit	erimvs	eritis	ervnt
Future Perfect	fvero	fveris	fverit	fverimvs	fveritis	fverint
Subjunctive
Present	sim	sis	sit	simvs	sitis	sint
Perfect	fverim	fveris	fverit	fverimvs	fveritis	fverint
Imperfect	essem	esses	esset	essemvs	essetis	essent
Pluperfect	fvissem	fvisses	fvisset	fvissemvs	fvissetis	fvissent
Imperative
		es			este

=== sto ===
Non-finite
Present Infinitive	stare		Perfect Infinitive		stetisse
Present participle	stans		Future participle		statvrvs
Gerund	standvm		Supine		statv(m)
Person	ego	tu	-†	nos	vos	-†
Indicative
Present	sto	stas	stat	stamvs	statis	stant
Perfect	steti	stetisti	stetit	stetimvs	stetistis	stetervnt
Imperfect	stabam	stabas	stabat	stabamvs	stabatis	stabant
Pluperfect	steteram	steteras	steterat	steteramvs	steteratis	steterant
Future	stabo	stabis	stabit	stabimvs	stabitis	stabvnt
Future Perfect	stetero	steteris	steterit	steterimvs	steteritis	steterint
Subjunctive
Present	stem	stes	stet	stemvs	stetis	stent
Perfect	steterim	steteris	steterit	steterimvs	steteritis	steterint
Imperfect	starem	stares	staret	staremvs	staretis	starent
Pluperfect	stetissem	stetisses	stetisset	stetissemvs	stetissetis	stetissent
Imperative
		sta			state

† Demonstratives used when necessary.

For information on the morphological evolution of the Romance copula, see Romance verbs.

== See also ==
- Verb
  - Copula
    - Indo-European copula
  - Basque verbs §§ Izan ('be') and Egon
  - Grammatical conjugation
- Latin
  - Latin grammar
  - Latin declension
  - Latin conjugation
  - Vulgar Latin
- Romance languages
  - Catalan language
    - Catalan grammar
    - Conjugation of auxiliary Catalan verbs
    - Conjugation of regular Catalan verbs
  - French language
    - French grammar
    - French verbs
    - French conjugation
  - Italian language
    - Italian grammar
    - Italian verbs
  - Portuguese language
    - Portuguese grammar
    - Portuguese conjugation
  - Romanian language
    - Romanian grammar
    - Romanian verbs
  - Romansh language
  - Sicilian language
  - Spanish language
    - Spanish grammar
    - Spanish conjugation
    - Spanish irregular verbs
    - Spanish verbs
- Romance verbs
- Romance-based Creole languages
  - French-based creole languages
    - Haitian Creole language § Copulas
      - Copula (linguistics) § Haitian Creole
  - Portuguese Creole
    - Cape Verdean Creole
  - Spanish-based creole languages
