= Occitan conjugation =

Aspect of Occitan grammar

This article discusses the conjugation of verbs in a number of varieties of the Occitan language, including Old Occitan and Catalan. Each verbal form is accompanied by its phonetic transcription. The similarities with Catalan are more noticeable in the written forms than in pronunciation.

== First group verbs (-ar verbs) ==
This is the group most Occitan verbs belong to. Examples include aimar ("to love"), esperar ("to wait" and "to hope"), manjar ("to eat") and pensar ("to think").

=== Parlar ("to speak") ===
- Note: Because the Languedocian dialect is often considered as a basis for standard Occitan, it is colored gold.

Aupenc	Auvernhàs	Gascon	Lemosin	Lengadocian	Provençau	Old Occitan	Catalan
Infinitive
parlar [paɾˈlaɾ]	parlar [paɾˈla]	parlar [paɾˈla]	parlar [paɾˈla]	parlar [paɾˈla]	parlar [paʀˈla]	parlar [paɾˈlaɾ]	parlar [pərˈɫa]
Past participle
parlat [paɾˈla] parlaa [paɾˈlaɔ]	parlat [paɾˈla] parlada [paɾˈladɔ]	parlat [paɾˈlat] parlada [paɾˈlaðɔ]	parlat [paɾˈla] parlada [paɾˈladɔ]	parlat [paɾˈlat] parlada [paɾˈlaðɔ]	parlat [paʀˈla] parlada [paʀˈladɔ]	parlat [paɾˈlat] parlada [paɾˈlada]	parlat [pərˈɫat] parlada [pərˈɫaðə]
Present participle
parlant [paɾˈlant]	parlant [paɾˈlan]	parlant [paɾˈlan]	parlant [paɾˈlan]	parlant [paɾˈlant]	parlant [paʀˈlant]	parlan [paɾˈlan]	parlant [pərˈɫan]
Imperative
parla! [ˈpaɾlɔ] parlem! [paɾˈlen] parlatz! [paɾˈlas]	parla! [ˈpaɾlɔ] parlassiam! [paɾlaˈsjan] parlatz! [paɾˈla]	parla! [ˈpaɾlɔ] parlem! [paɾˈlem] parlatz! [paɾˈlats]	parla! [ˈpaɾlɔ] parlem! [paɾˈlen] parlatz! [paɾˈla]	parla! [ˈpaɾlɔ] parlem! [paɾˈlen] parlatz! [paɾˈlats]	parla! [ˈpaʀlɔ] parlem! [paʀˈlen] parlatz! [paʀˈlas]	parla! [ˈpaɾla] parlem! [paɾˈlem] parlatz! [paɾˈlats]	parla! [ˈparɫə] parlem! [pəɾˈɫɛm] parleu! [pərˈɫɛw]
Present indicative
parlo [ˈpaɾlu] parles [ˈpaɾles] parla [ˈpaɾlɔ] parlèm [paɾˈlɛn] parlètz [paɾˈlɛs] parlan [ˈpaɾlɔn]	parle [ˈpaɾle] parles [ˈpaɾle] parla [ˈpaɾlɔ] parlam [paɾˈlan] parlatz [paɾˈla] parlon [ˈpaɾlu]	parli [ˈpaɾli] parlas [ˈpaɾlɔs] parla [ˈpaɾlɔ] parlam [paɾˈlam] parlatz [paɾˈlats] parlan [ˈpaɾlɔn]	parle [ˈpaɾle] parlas [ˈpaɾla] parla [ˈpaɾlɔ] parlam [paɾˈlan] parlatz [paɾˈla] parlan [ˈpaɾlɔ]	parli [ˈpaɾli] parlas [ˈpaɾlɔs] parla [ˈpaɾlɔ] parlam [paɾˈlan] parlatz [paɾˈlats] parlan [ˈpaɾlɔn]	parle [ˈpaʀle] parles [ˈpaʀles] parla [ˈpaʀlɔ] parlam [paʀˈlan] parlatz [paʀˈlas] parlan [ˈpaʀlɔn]	parli [ˈpaɾli] parlas [ˈpaɾlas] parla [ˈpaɾla] parlam [paɾˈlam] parlatz [paɾˈlats] parlan [ˈpaɾlan]	parlo [ˈpaɾɫu] parles [ˈpaɾɫəs] parla [ˈparɫə] parlem [pərˈɫɛm] parleu [pərˈɫɛw] parlen [ˈpaɾɫən]
Imperfect indicative
parlavo [paɾˈlavu] parlaves [paɾˈlaves] parlava [paɾˈlavɔ] parlaviam [paɾlaˈvjan] parlaviatz [paɾlaˈvjas] parlavan [paɾˈlavɔn]	parlave [paɾˈlave] parlaves [paɾˈlave] parlava [paɾˈlavɔ] parlaviam [paɾlaˈvjan] parlaviatz [paɾlaˈvja] parlavon [paɾˈlavu]	parlavi [paɾˈlawi] parlavas [paɾˈlawɔs] parlava [paɾˈlawɔ] parlàvam [paɾˈlawɔm] parlàvatz [paɾˈlawɔts] parlavan [paɾˈlawɔn]	parlava [paɾˈlavɔ] parlavas [paɾˈlava] parlava [paɾˈlavɔ] parlàvam [paɾˈlavan] parlàvatz [paɾˈlava] parlavan [paɾˈlavɔn]	parlavi [paɾˈlaβi] parlavas [paɾˈlaβɔs] parlava [paɾˈlaβɔ] parlàvem [paɾˈlaβen] parlàvetz [paɾˈlaβets] parlavan [paɾˈlaβɔn]	parlave [paʀˈlave] parlaves [paʀˈlaves] parlava [paʀˈlavɔ] parlaviam [paʀlaˈvjan] parlaviatz [paʀlaˈvjas] parlavan [paʀˈlavɔn]	parlava [paɾˈlava] parlavas [paɾˈlavas] parlava [paɾˈlava] parlavam [paɾlaˈvam] parlavatz [paɾlaˈvats] parlavan [paɾˈlavan]	parlava [pərˈɫaβə] parlaves [pərˈɫaβəs] parlava [pərˈɫaβə] parlàvem [pərˈɫaβəm] parlàveu [pərˈɫaβəw] parlavan [pərˈɫaβən]
Preterite indicative
parlèro [paɾˈlɛɾu] parlères [paɾˈlɛɾes] parlèc [paɾˈlɛk] parleriam [paɾleˈɾjan] parleriatz [paɾleˈɾjas] parlèron [paɾˈlɛɾun]	parlere [paɾˈleɾe] parleres [paɾˈleɾe] parlet [paɾˈlet] parlem [paɾˈlen] parletz [paɾˈle] parleron [paɾˈleɾu]	parlèi [paɾˈlɛj] parlès [paɾˈlɛs] parlè [paɾˈlɛ] parlèm [paɾˈlɛm] parlètz [paɾˈlɛts] parlèn [paɾˈlɛn]	parlei [paɾˈlej] parleras [paɾˈleɾa] parlet [paɾˈle] parlèram [paɾˈlɛɾɔn] parlèratz [paɾˈlɛɾa] parleran [paɾˈleɾɔ]	parlèri [paɾˈlɛɾi] parlères [paɾˈlɛɾes] parlèt [paɾˈlɛt] parlèrem [paɾˈlɛɾen] parlèretz [paɾˈlɛɾets] parlèron [paɾˈlɛɾun]	parlère [paʀˈlɛɾe] parlères [paʀˈlɛɾes] parlèt [paʀˈlɛt] parleriam [paʀleˈɾjan] parleriatz [paʀleˈɾjas] parlèron [paʀˈlɛɾun]	parlei [paɾˈlej] parlest [paɾˈlest] parlet [paɾˈlet] parlem [paɾˈlem] parletz [paɾˈlets] parleron [paɾˈleɾun]	parlí [pərˈɫi] parlares [pərˈɫaɾəs] parlà [pərˈɫa] parlàrem [pərˈɫaɾəm] parlàreu [pərˈɫaɾəw] parlaren [pərˈɫaɾən]
Future indicative
parlarai [paɾla'ɾaj] parlarás [paɾla'ɾes] parlará [paɾla'ɾe] parlarem [paɾla'ɾen] parlaretz [paɾla'ɾes] parlarán [paɾla'ɾen]	parlarai [paɾla'ɾaj] parlarás [paɾla'ɾɔ] parlará [paɾla'ɾɔ] parlarem [paɾla'ɾen] parlaretz [paɾla'ɾe] parlarán [paɾla'ɾɔ]	parlarèi [paɾla'ɾɛj] parlaràs [paɾla'ɾas] parlarà [paɾla'ɾa] parlaram [paɾla'ɾam] parlaratz [paɾla'ɾats] parlaràn [paɾla'ɾan]	parlarai [paɾla'ɾaj] parlaràs [paɾla'ɾa] parlará [paɾla'ɾɔ] parlarem [paɾla'ɾen] parlaretz [paɾla'ɾe] parlarán [paɾla'ɾɔ]	parlarai [paɾla'ɾaj] parlaràs [paɾla'ɾas] parlarà [paɾla'ɾa] parlarem [paɾla'ɾen] parlaretz [paɾla'ɾets] parlaràn [paɾla'ɾan]	parlarai [paʀla'ɾaj] parlaràs [paʀla'ɾas] parlarà [paʀla'ɾa] parlarem [paʀla'ɾen] parlaretz [paʀla'ɾes] parlaràn [paʀla'ɾan]	parlarai [paɾla'ɾaj] parlaràs [paɾla'ɾas] parlarà [paɾla'ɾa] parlarem [paɾla'ɾem] parlaretz [paɾla'ɾets] parlaràn [paɾla'ɾan]	parlaré [pəɾɫə'ɾe] parlaràs [pəɾɫə'ɾas] parlarà [pəɾɫə'ɾa] parlarem [pərɫəˈɾɛm] parlareu [pərɫəˈɾɛw] parlaran [pərɫəˈɾan]
Conditional
parlariáu [paɾlaˈɾjew] parlariás [paɾlaˈɾjes] parlariá [paɾlaˈɾje] parlariam [paɾlaˈɾjan] parlariatz [paɾlaˈɾjas] parlarián [paɾlaˈɾjen]	parlariá [paɾlaˈɾjɔ] parlariás [paɾlaˈɾjɔ] parlariá [paɾlaˈɾjɔ] parlariam [paɾlaˈɾjan] parlariatz [paɾlaˈɾja] parlarián [paɾlaˈɾjɔ]	parlarí [paɾlaˈɾi] parlarés [paɾlaˈɾes] parlaré [paɾlaˈɾe] parlarem [paɾlaˈɾem] parlaretz [paɾlaˈɾets] parlarén [paɾlaˈɾen]	parlariá [paɾlaˈɾjɔ] parlariàs [paɾlaˈɾja] parlariá [paɾlaˈɾjɔ] parlariam [paɾlaˈɾjan] parlariatz [paɾlaˈɾja] parlarián [paɾlaˈɾjɔ]	parlariái [paɾlaˈɾjɔj] parlariás [paɾlaˈɾjɔs] parlariá [paɾlaˈɾjɔ] parlariam [paɾlaˈɾjan] parlariatz [paɾlaˈɾjats] parlarián [paɾlaˈɾjɔn]	parlariáu [paʀlaˈɾjew] parlariás [paʀlaˈɾjes] parlariá [paʀlaˈɾje] parlariam [paʀlaˈɾjan] parlariatz [paʀlaˈɾjas] parlarián [paʀlaˈɾjen]	parlaria [paɾlaˈɾia] parlarias [paɾlaˈɾias] parlaria [paɾlaˈɾia] parlariam [paɾlaˈɾjam] parlariatz [paɾlaˈɾjats] parlarian [paɾlaˈɾian]	parlaria [pərɫəˈɾiə] parlaries [pərɫəˈɾiəs] parlaria [pərɫəˈɾiə] parlaríem [pərɫəˈɾiəm] parlaríeu [pərɫəˈɾiəw] parlarien [pərɫəˈɾiən]
Present subjunctive
parlo [ˈpaɾlu] parles [ˈpaɾles] parle [ˈpaɾle] parlem [paɾˈlen] parletz [paɾˈles] parlan [ˈpaɾlɔn]	parle [ˈpaɾle] parles [ˈpaɾle] parle [ˈpaɾle] parlassiam [paɾlaˈsjan] parlassiatz [paɾlaˈsja] parlon [ˈpaɾlu]	parli [ˈpaɾli] parles [ˈpaɾles] parle [ˈpaɾle] parlem [paɾˈlem] parletz [paɾˈlets] parlen [ˈpaɾlen]	parle [ˈpaɾle] parles [ˈpaɾle] parle [ˈpaɾle] parlem [paɾˈlen] parletz [paɾˈle] parlen [ˈpaɾle]	parle [ˈpaɾle] parles [ˈpaɾles] parle [ˈpaɾle] parlem [paɾˈlen] parletz [paɾˈlets] parlen [ˈpaɾlen]	parle [ˈpaʀle] parles [ˈpaʀles] parle [ˈpaʀle] parlem [paʀˈlen] parletz [paʀˈles] parlan [ˈpaʀlɔn]	parle [ˈpaɾle] parles [ˈpaɾles] parle [ˈpaɾle] parlem [paɾˈlem] parletz [paɾˈlets] parlen [ˈpaɾlen]	parli [ˈparɫi] parlis [ˈparɫis] parli [ˈparɫi] parlem [pərˈɫɛm] parleu [pərˈɫɛw] parlin [ˈparɫin]
Imperfect subjunctive
parlèssio [paɾˈlɛsju] parlèssias [paɾˈlɛsis] parlèssia [paɾˈlɛsi] parlessiam [paɾleˈsjan] parlessiatz [paɾleˈsjas] parlèssian [paɾˈlɛsin]	parlesse [paɾˈlese] parlesses [paɾˈlese] parlesse [paɾˈlese] parlessiam [paɾleˈsjan] parlessiatz [paɾleˈsja] parlesson [paɾˈlesu]	parlèssi [paɾˈlɛsi] parlèsses [paɾˈlɛses] parlèsse [paɾˈlɛse] parlèssem [paɾˈlɛsem] parlèssetz [paɾˈlɛsets] parlèssen [paɾˈlɛsen]	parlèsse [paɾˈlɛse] parlèsses [paɾˈlɛse] parlèsse [paɾˈlɛse] parlèssem [paɾˈlɛsen] parlèssetz [paɾˈlɛse] parlèssen [paɾˈlɛse]	parlèssi [paɾˈlɛsi] parlèsses [paɾˈlɛses] parlèsse [paɾˈlɛse] parlèssem [paɾˈlɛsen] parlèssetz [paɾˈlɛsets] parlèsson [paɾˈlɛsun]	parlèsse [paʀˈlɛse] parlèsses [paʀˈlɛses] parlèsse [paʀˈlɛse] parlessiam [paʀleˈsjan] parlessiatz [paʀleˈsjas] parlèsson [paʀˈlɛsun]	parlés [paɾˈles] parlesses [paɾˈleses] parlés [paɾˈles] parlessem [paɾleˈsen] parlessetz [paɾleˈsets] parlessen [paɾˈlesen]	parlés [pərˈɫes] parlessis [pərˈɫesis] parlés [pərˈɫes] parléssim [pərˈɫesim] parléssiu [pərˈɫesiw] parlessin [pərˈɫesin]
Future perfect
		parlèri [paɾˈlɛɾi] parlères [paɾˈlɛɾes] parlère [paɾˈlɛɾe] parlèrem [paɾˈlɛɾem] parlèretz [paɾˈlɛɾets] parlèren [paɾˈlɛɾen]					

=== Portar ("to carry") ===
This verb is conjugated like parlar; but in the first-person singular, second-person singular, third-person singular, and third-person plural present (both indicative and subjunctive) and second-person singular imperative tenses, its stems changed to pòrt- (pòrti). This change also happened on verbs such as cremar where the stems change to crèm- (crèmi). However, most of the online sources most likely only give the conjugations in the Languedocian dialect.

== Second group verbs (-ir verbs) ==
This is the second regular group of verbs, and also the second largest. Examples include finir ("to finish"), partir ("to leave"), fugir ("to flee") and morir ("to die"). Even though the latter three normally give part, fug and mòr at the third person singular of present indicative, in a number of parts of Occitania they will also be declined using the -iss- augment, thus giving partís, fugís and morís.

=== Verbs with one stem: sentir ("to feel") ===
- Note: Because the Languedocian dialect is often considered as a basis for standard Occitan, the standard is colored gold.

Aupenc	Auvernhàs	Gascon	Lemosin	Lengadocian	Provençau	Old Occitan	Catalan
Infinitive
sentir [senˈtiɾ]	sentir [senˈti]	sentir [senˈti]	sentir [senˈti]	sentir [senˈti]	sentir [senˈti]	sentir [senˈtiɾ]	sentir [sənˈti]
Past participle
sentit [senˈti] sentia [senˈtiɔ]	sentit [senˈti] sentida [senˈtidɔ]	sentit [senˈtit] sentida [senˈtiðɔ]	sentit [senˈti] sentida [senˈtidɔ]	sentit [senˈtit] sentida [senˈtiðɔ]	sentit [senˈti] sentida [senˈtidɔ]	sentit [senˈtit] sentida [senˈtida]	sentit [sənˈtit] sentida [sənˈtidə]
Present participle
sentent [senˈtent]	sentent [senˈten]	sentint [senˈtint]	sentent [senˈten]	sentent [senˈtent]	sentent [senˈtent]	senten [senˈten]	sentint [sənˈtin(t)]
Imperative
sente! [ˈsente] sentem! [senˈten] sentètz! [senˈtɛs]	sent! [sen] sentiguessiam! [sentigeˈsjan] sentetz! [senˈte]	sent! [sent] sentim! [senˈtim] sentitz! [senˈtits]	sent! [sen] sentam! [senˈtan] sentetz! [senˈte]	sent! [sent] sentam! [senˈtan] sentètz! [senˈtɛts]	sente! [ˈsente] sentem! [senˈten] sentètz! [senˈtɛs]	sent! [sent] sentam! [senˈtam] sentetz! [senˈtets]	sent! [sen] sentim! [sənˈtim] sentiu! [sənˈtiw]
Present indicative
sento [ˈsentu] sentes [ˈsentes] sente [ˈsente] sentèm [senˈtɛn] sentètz [senˈtɛs] senton [ˈsentun]	sente [ˈsente] sentes [ˈsente] sent [sent] sentam [senˈtan] sentetz [senˈte] senton [ˈsentu]	senti [ˈsenti] sentes [ˈsentes] sent [sent] sentim [senˈtim] sentitz [senˈtits] senten [ˈsenten]	sente [ˈsente] sentes [ˈsentej] sent [sen] sentem [senˈten] sentetz [senˈtej] senten [ˈsente]	senti [ˈsenti] sentes [ˈsentes] sent [sent] sentèm [senˈtɛn] sentètz [senˈtɛts] senton [ˈsentun]	sente [ˈsente] sentes [ˈsentes] sent [sent] sentèm [senˈtɛn] sentètz [senˈtɛs] senton [ˈsentun]	sent [ˈsent] sentz [sents] sent [sent] sentem [senˈtem] sentetz [senˈtets] senton [ˈsentun]	sento [ˈsentu] sents [sen(t)s] sent [sen(t)] sentim [sənˈtim] sentiu [sənˈtiw] senten [ˈsentən]
Imperfect indicative
sentiáu [senˈtjew] sentiás [senˈtjes] sentiá [senˈtje] sentiam [senˈtjan] sentiatz [senˈtjas] sentián [senˈtjen]	sentiá [senˈtjɔ] sentiàs [senˈtja] sentiá [senˈtjɔ] sentiam [senˈtjan] sentiatz [senˈtja] sentián [senˈtjɔ]	sentivi [senˈtiwi] sentivas [senˈtiwɔs] sentiva [senˈtiwɔ] sentívam [senˈtiwam] sentívatz [senˈtiwats] sentivan [senˈtiwɔn]	sentiá [senˈtjɔ] sentiàs [senˈtja] sentiá [senˈtjɔ] sentiam [senˈtjan] sentiatz [senˈtja] sentián [senˈtjɔ]	sentiái [senˈtjɔj] sentiás [senˈtjɔs] sentiá [senˈtjɔ] sentiam [senˈtjan] sentiatz [senˈtjats] sentián [senˈtjɔn]	sentiáu [senˈtjew] sentiás [senˈtjes] sentiá [senˈtje] sentiam [senˈtjan] sentiatz [senˈtjas] sentián [senˈtjen]	sentia [senˈtia] sentias [senˈtias] sentia [senˈtia] sentiam [senˈtjam] sentiatz [senˈtjats] sentian [senˈtian]	sentia [sənˈtiə] senties [sənˈtiəs] sentia [sənˈtiə] sentíem [sənˈtiəm] sentíeu [sənˈtiəw] sentien [sənˈtiən]
Preterite indicative
sentèro [senˈtɛɾu] sentères [senˈtɛɾes] sentèc [senˈtɛk] senteriam [senteˈɾjan] senteriatz [senteˈɾias] sentèron [senˈtɛɾun]	sentiguere [sentiˈgeɾe] sentigueres [sentiˈgeɾe] sentiguet [sentiˈget] sentiguem [sentiˈgen] sentiguetz [sentiˈge] sentigueron [sentiˈgeɾu]	sentii [senˈtiji] sentís [senˈtis] sentí [senˈti] sentim [senˈtim] sentitz [senˈtits] sentín [senˈtin]	sentei [senˈtej] senteras [senˈteɾa] sentet [senˈte] sentèram [senˈtɛɾan] sentèratz [senˈtɛɾa] senteran [senˈteɾɔ]	sentiguèri [sentiˈgɛɾi] sentiguères [sentiˈgɛɾes] sentiguèt [sentiˈgɛt] sentiguèrem [sentiˈgɛɾen] sentiguèretz [sentiˈgɛɾets] sentiguèron [sentiˈgɛɾun]	sentiguère [sentiˈgɛɾe] sentiguères [sentiˈgɛɾes] sentiguèt [sentiˈgɛt] sentigueriam [sentigeˈɾjan] sentigueriatz [sentigeˈɾias] sentiguèron [sentiˈgɛɾun]	sentí [senˈti] sentist [senˈtist] sentit [senˈtit] sentim [senˈtim] sentitz [senˈtits] sentiron [senˈtiɾun]	sentí sentires sentí sentírem sentíreu sentiren
Future indicative
sentirai [senti'ɾaj] sentirás [senti'ɾes] sentirá [senti'ɾe] sentirem [senti'ɾen] sentiretz [senti'ɾes] sentirán [senti'ɾen]	sentirai [senti'ɾaj] sentiràs [senti'ɾa] sentirà [senti'ɾɔ] sentirem [senti'ɾen] sentiretz [senti'ɾe] sentirán [senti'ɾɔ]	sentirèi [senti'ɾɛj] sentiràs [senti'ɾas] sentirà [senti'ɾa] sentiram [senti'ɾam] sentiratz [senti'ɾats] sentiràn [senti'ɾan]	sentirai [senti'ɾaj] sentiràs [senti'ɾa] sentirá [senti'ɾɔ] sentirem [senti'ɾen] sentiretz [senti'ɾe] sentirán [senti'ɾɔ]	sentirai [senti'ɾaj] sentiràs [senti'ɾas] sentirà [senti'ɾa] sentirem [senti'ɾen] sentiretz [senti'ɾets] sentiràn [senti'ɾan]	sentirai [senti'ɾaj] sentiràs [senti'ɾas] sentirà [senti'ɾa] sentirem [senti'ɾen] sentiretz [senti'ɾes] sentiràn [senti'ɾan]	sentirai [senti'ɾaj] sentiràs [senti'ɾas] sentirà [senti'ɾa] sentiram [senti'ɾam] sentiratz [senti'ɾats] sentiràn [senti'ɾan]	sentiré sentiràs sentirà sentirem sentireu sentiran
Conditional
sentiriáu [sentiˈɾjew] sentiriás [sentiˈɾjes] sentiriá [sentiˈɾje] sentiriam [sentiˈɾjan] sentiriatz [sentiˈɾjas] sentirián [sentiˈɾjen]	sentiriá [sentiˈɾjɔ] sentiriás [sentiˈɾjɔ] sentiriá [sentiˈɾjɔ] sentiriam [sentiˈɾjan] sentiriatz [sentiˈɾja] sentirián [sentiˈɾjɔ]	sentirí [sentiˈɾi] sentirés [sentiˈɾes] sentiré [sentiˈɾe] sentirem [sentiˈɾem] sentiretz [sentiˈɾets] sentirén [sentiˈɾen]	sentiriá [sentiˈɾjɔ] sentiriàs [sentiˈɾja] sentiriá [sentiˈɾjɔ] sentiriam [sentiˈɾjan] sentiriatz [sentiˈɾja] sentirián [sentiˈɾjɔ]	sentiriái [sentiˈɾjɔj] sentiriás [sentiˈɾjɔs] sentiriá [sentiˈɾjɔ] sentiriam [sentiˈɾjan] sentiriatz [sentiˈɾjats] sentirián [sentiˈɾjɔn]	sentiriáu [sentiˈɾjew] sentiriás [sentiˈɾjes] sentiriá [sentiˈɾje] sentiriam [sentiˈɾjan] sentiriatz [sentiˈɾjas] sentirián [sentiˈɾjen]	sentiria [sentiˈɾia] sentirias [sentiˈɾias] sentiria [sentiˈɾia] sentiriam [sentiˈɾjam] sentiriatz [sentiˈɾjats] sentirian [sentiˈɾian]	sentiria sentiries sentiria sentiríem sentiríeu sentirien
Present subjunctive
sèntio [ˈsɛntju] sèntias [ˈsɛntis] sèntia [ˈsɛnti] sentiam [senˈtjan] sentiatz [senˈtjas] sèntian [ˈsɛntin]	séntie [ˈsentje] sénties [ˈsentje] séntie [ˈsentje] sentiguessiam [sentigeˈsjan] sentiguessiatz [sentigeˈsja] séntion [ˈsentju]	sénti [ˈsenti] sentias [ˈsentjɔs] sentia [ˈsentjɔ] sentiam [senˈtjam] sentiatz [senˈtjats] sentian [ˈsentjɔn]	senta [ˈsentɔ] sentas [ˈsenta] senta [ˈsentɔ] sentam [senˈtan] sentatz [senˈta] sentan [ˈsentɔ]	senta [ˈsentɔ] sentas [ˈsentɔs] senta [ˈsentɔ] sentam [senˈtan] sentatz [senˈtats] sentan [ˈsentɔn]	sente [ˈsente] sentes [ˈsentes] sente [ˈsente] sentem [senˈten] sentetz [senˈtes] sentan [ˈsentɔn]	senta [ˈsenta] sentas [ˈsentas] senta [ˈsenta] sentam [senˈtam] sentatz [senˈtats] sentan [ˈsentan]	senti sentis senti sentim sentiu sentin
Imperfect subjunctive
sentèssio [senˈtɛsju] sentèssias [senˈtɛsis] sentèssia [senˈtɛsi] sentessiam [senteˈsjan] sentessiatz [senteˈsjas] sentèssian [senˈtɛsin]	sentiguesse [sentiˈgese] sentiguesses [sentiˈgese] sentiguesse [sentiˈgese] sentiguessiam [sentigeˈsjan] sentiguessiatz [sentigeˈsja] sentiguesson [sentiˈgesu]	sentissi [senˈtisi] sentisses [senˈtises] sentisse [senˈtise] sentíssem [senˈtisem] sentíssetz [senˈtisets] sentissen [senˈtisen]	sentèsse [senˈtɛse] sentèsses [senˈtɛse] sentèsse [senˈtɛse] sentèssem [senˈtɛsen] sentèssetz [senˈtɛse] sentèssen [senˈtɛse]	sentiguèssi [sentiˈgɛsi] sentiguèsses [sentiˈgɛses] sentiguèsse [sentiˈgɛse] sentiguèssem [sentiˈgɛsen] sentiguèssetz [sentiˈgɛsets] sentiguèsson [sentiˈgɛsun]	sentiguèsse [sentiˈgɛse] sentiguèsses [sentiˈgɛses] sentiguèsse [sentiˈgɛse] sentiguessiam [sentigeˈsjan] sentiguessiatz [sentigeˈsjas] sentiguèsson [sentiˈgɛsun]	sentís [senˈtis] sentisses [senˈtises] sentís [senˈtis] sentissem [sentiˈsem] sentissetz [sentiˈsets] sentissen [senˈtisen]	sentís sentissis sentís sentíssim sentíssiu sentissin
Future perfect
		sentiri [senˈtiɾi] sentires [senˈtiɾes] sentire [senˈtiɾe] sentírem [senˈtiɾem] sentíretz [senˈtiɾets] sentiren [senˈtiɾen]					

=== Verbs with two stems: bastir ("to build") ===
These verbs have a basic stem (bast-) and an extended stem (bastiss-), in which the augment -iss- derives from the Latin inchoative suffix -esc-.

Aupenc	Auvernhàs	Gascon	Lemosin	Lengadocian	Provençau	Old Occitan	Catalan
Infinitive
bastir [basˈtiɾ]	bastir [basˈti]	bastir [basˈti]	bastir [basˈti]	bastir [basˈti]	bastir [basˈti]	bastir [basˈtiɾ]	bastir
Past participle
bastit [basˈti] bastia [basˈtiɔ]	bastit [basˈti] bastida [basˈtidɔ]	bastit [basˈtit] bastida [basˈtiðɔ]	bastit [ba:ˈti] bastida [ba:ˈtidɔ]	bastit [basˈtit] bastida [basˈtiðɔ]	bastit [basˈti] bastida [basˈtidɔ]	bastit [basˈtit] bastida [basˈtida]	bastit [bəsˈtit] bastida [bəsˈtiðə]
Present participle
bastissent [bastiˈsent]	bastissent [bastiˈsen]	bastint [basˈtint]	bastissent [ba:tiˈsen]	bastissent [bastiˈsent]	bastissent [bastiˈsent]	bastissen [bastiˈsen]	bastint [bəsˈtin]
Imperative
bastís! [basˈtis] bastissèm! [bastiˈsɛn] bastissètz! [bastiˈsɛs]	bastís! [basˈti] bastiguessiam! [bastigeˈsjan] bastissetz! [bastiˈse]	basteish! [basˈteʃ] bastim! [basˈtim] bastitz! [basˈtits]	bastís! [ba:ˈti] bastissam! [ba:tiˈsan] bastissetz! [ba:tiˈse]	bastís! [basˈtis] bastiscam! [bastisˈkan] bastissètz! [bastiˈsɛts]	bastisse! [basˈtise] bastissèm! [bastiˈsɛn] bastissètz! [bastiˈsɛs]	bastís! [basˈtis] bastiscam! [bastisˈkam] bastetz! [basˈtets]	basteix! bastim! bastieu!
Present indicative
bastisso [basˈtisu] bastisses [basˈtises] bastís [basˈtis] bastissèm [basˈtisɛn] bastissètz [bastiˈsɛs] bastisson [basˈtisun]	bastisse [basˈtise] bastisses [basˈtise] bastís [basˈtis] bastissam [basˈtisan] bastissetz [bastiˈse] bastisson [basˈtisu]	basteishi [basˈteʃi] basteishes [basˈteʃes] basteish [basˈteʃ] basteishem [basteˈʃem] basteishetz [basteˈʃets] basteishen [basˈteʃen]	bastisse [ba:ˈtise] bastisses [ba:ˈtisej] bastís [ba:ˈti] bastissem [ba:tiˈsen] bastissetz [ba:tiˈsej] bastissen [ba:ˈtise]	bastissi [basˈtisi] bastisses [basˈtises] bastís [basˈtis] bastissèm [bastiˈsɛn] bastissètz [basti'sɛts] bastisson [basˈtisun]	bastisse [basˈtise] bastisses [basˈtises] bastís [basˈtis] bastissèm [basˈtisɛn] bastissètz [basti'sɛs] bastisson [basˈtisun]	bastisc [basˈtisk] bastisses [basˈtises] bastís [basˈtis] bastem [basˈten] bastetz [bas'tets] bastiscon [basˈtiskun]	basteixo [bəsˈtɛʃu] basteixes basteix bastim bastiu basteixen
Imperfect indicative
bastissiáu [bastiˈsjew] bastissiás [bastiˈsjes] bastissiá [bastiˈsje] bastissiam [bastiˈsjan] bastissiatz [bastiˈsjas] bastissián [bastiˈsjen]	bastissiá [bastiˈsjɔ] bastissiàs [bastiˈsja] bastissiá [bastiˈsjɔ] bastissiam [bastiˈsjan] bastissiatz [bastiˈsja] bastissián [bastiˈsjɔ]	bastivi [basˈtiwi] bastivas [basˈtiwɔs] bastiva [basˈtiwɔ] bastívam [basˈtiwam] bastívatz [basˈtiwats] bastivan [basˈtiwɔn]	bastissiá [ba:tiˈsjɔ] bastissiàs [ba:tiˈsja] bastissiá [ba:tiˈsjɔ] bastissiam [ba:tiˈsjan] bastissiatz [ba:tiˈsja] bastissián [ba:tiˈsjɔ]	bastissiái [bastiˈsjɔj] bastissiás [bastiˈsjɔs] bastissiá [bastiˈsjɔ] bastissiam [bastiˈsjan] bastissiatz [bastiˈsjats] bastissián [bastiˈsjɔn]	bastissiáu [bastiˈsjew] bastissiás [bastiˈsjes] bastissiá [bastiˈsje] bastissiam [bastiˈsjan] bastissiatz [bastiˈsjas] bastissián [bastiˈsjen]	bastia [basˈtia] bastias [basˈtias] bastia [basˈtia] bastiam [basˈtjam] bastiatz [basˈtjats] bastian [basˈtian]	bastia basties bastia bastíem bastíeu bastien
Preterite indicative
bastissèro [bastiˈsɛɾu] bastissères [bastiˈsɛɾes] bastissèc [bastiˈsɛk] bastisseriam [bastiseˈɾjan] bastisseriatz [bastiseˈɾias] bastissèron [bastiˈsɛɾun]	bastiguere [bastiˈgeɾe] bastigueres [bastiˈgeɾe] bastiguet [bastiˈget] bastiguem [bastiˈgen] bastiguetz [bastiˈge] bastigueron [bastiˈgeɾu]	bastii [basˈtiji] bastís [basˈtis] bastí [basˈti] bastim [basˈtim] bastitz [basˈtits] bastín [basˈtin]	bastiguei [ba:tiˈgej] bastigueras [ba:tiˈgeɾa] bastiguet [ba:tiˈge] bastiguèram [ba:tiˈgɛɾan] bastiguèratz [ba:tiˈgɛɾa] bastigueran [ba:tiˈgeɾɔ]	bastiguèri [bastiˈɣɛɾi] bastiguères [bastiˈɣɛɾes] bastiguèt [bastiˈɣɛt] bastiguèrem [bastiˈɣɛɾen] bastiguèretz [bastiˈɣɛɾets] bastiguèron [bastiˈɣɛɾun]	bastiguère [bastiˈgɛɾe] bastiguères [bastiˈgɛɾes] bastiguèt [bastiˈgɛt] bastigueriam [bastigeˈɾjan] bastigueriatz [bastigeˈɾias] bastiguèron [bastiˈgɛɾun]	bastí [basˈti] bastist [basˈtist] bastit [basˈtit] bastim [basˈtim] bastitz [basˈtits] bastiron [basˈtiɾun]	bastí bastires bastí bastírem bastíreu bastirien
Future indicative
bastirai [basti'ɾaj] bastirás [basti'ɾes] bastirá [basti'ɾe] bastirem [basti'ɾen] bastiretz [basti'ɾes] bastirán [basti'ɾen]	bastirai [basti'ɾaj] bastiràs [basti'ɾa] bastirà [basti'ɾɔ] bastirem [basti'ɾen] bastiretz [basti'ɾe] bastirán [basti'ɾɔ]	bastirèi [basti'ɾɛj] bastiràs [basti'ɾas] bastirà [basti'ɾa] bastiram [basti'ɾam] bastiratz [basti'ɾats] bastiràn [basti'ɾan]	bastirai [ba:ti'ɾaj] bastiràs [ba:ti'ɾa] bastirá [ba:ti'ɾɔ] bastirem [ba:ti'ɾen] bastiretz [ba:ti'ɾe] bastirán [ba:ti'ɾɔ]	bastirai [basti'ɾaj] bastiràs [basti'ɾas] bastirà [basti'ɾa] bastirem [basti'ɾen] bastiretz [basti'ɾets] bastiràn [basti'ɾan]	bastirai [basti'ɾaj] bastiràs [basti'ɾas] bastirà [basti'ɾa] bastirem [basti'ɾen] bastiretz [basti'ɾes] bastiràn [basti'ɾan]	bastirai [basti'ɾaj] bastiràs [basti'ɾas] bastirà [basti'ɾa] bastirem [basti'ɾem] bastiretz [basti'ɾets] bastiràn [basti'ɾan]	bastiré bastiràs bastirà bastírem bastíreu bastiran
Conditional
bastiriáu [bastiˈɾjew] bastiriás [bastiˈɾjes] bastiriá [bastiˈɾje] bastiriam [bastiˈɾjan] bastiriatz [bastiˈɾjas] bastirián [bastiˈɾjen]	bastiriá [bastiˈɾjɔ] bastiriás [bastiˈɾjɔ] bastiriá [bastiˈɾjɔ] bastiriam [bastiˈɾjan] bastiriatz [bastiˈɾja] bastirián [bastiˈɾjɔ]	bastirí [bastiˈɾi] bastirés [bastiˈɾes] bastiré [bastiˈɾe] bastirem [bastiˈɾem] bastiretz [bastiˈɾets] bastirén [bastiˈɾen]	bastiriá [ba:tiˈɾjɔ] bastiriàs [ba:tiˈɾja] bastiriá [ba:tiˈɾjɔ] bastiriam [ba:tiˈɾjan] bastiriatz [ba:tiˈɾja] bastirián [ba:tiˈɾjɔ]	bastiriái [bastiˈɾjɔj] bastiriás [bastiˈɾjɔs] bastiriá [bastiˈɾjɔ] bastiriam [bastiˈɾjan] bastiriatz [bastiˈɾjats] bastirián [bastiˈɾjɔn]	bastiriáu [bastiˈɾjew] bastiriás [bastiˈɾjes] bastiriá [bastiˈɾje] bastiriam [bastiˈɾjan] bastiriatz [bastiˈɾjas] bastirián [bastiˈɾjen]	bastiria [bastiˈɾia] bastirias [bastiˈɾias] bastiria [bastiˈɾia] bastiriam [bastiˈɾjam] bastiriatz [bastiˈɾjats] bastirian [bastiˈɾian]	bastiria bastiries bastiria bastiríem bastiríeu bastirien
Present subjunctive
bastíssio [basˈtisju] bastíssias [basˈtisis] bastíssia [basˈtisi] bastissiam [bastiˈsjan] bastissiatz [bastiˈsjas] bastíssian [basˈtisin]	bastíssie [basˈtisje] bastíssies [basˈtisje] bastíssie [basˈtisje] bastiguessiam [bastigeˈsjan] bastiguessiatz [bastigeˈsja] bastíssion [basˈtisju]	bastesqui [basˈteski] bastescas [basˈteskɔs] bastesca [basˈteskɔ] bastescam [bastesˈkam] bastescatz [bastesˈkats] bastescan [basˈteskɔn]	bastissa [ba:ˈtisɔ] bastissas [ba:ˈtisa] bastissa [ba:ˈtisɔ] bastissam [ba:tiˈsan] bastissatz [ba:tiˈsa] bastissan [ba:ˈtisɔ]	bastisca [basˈtiskɔ] bastiscas [basˈtiskɔs] bastisca [basˈtiskɔ] bastiscam [bastisˈkan] bastiscatz [bastisˈkats] bastiscan [basˈtiskɔn]	bastigue [basˈtige] bastigues [basˈtiges] bastigue [basˈtige] bastiguem [bastiˈgen] bastiguetz [bastiˈges] bastigan [basˈtigɔn]	bastisca [basˈtiska] bastiscas [basˈtiskas] bastisca [basˈtiska] bastam [basˈtam] bastatz [basˈtats] bastiscan [basˈtiskan]	basteixi [bəsˈtɛʃi] basteixis basteixi bastim bastiu basteixin
Imperfect subjunctive
bastissèssio [bastiˈsɛsju] bastissèssias [bastiˈsɛsis] bastissèssia [bastiˈsɛsi] bastissessiam [bastisseˈsjan] bastissessiatz [bastisseˈsjas] bastissèssian [bastiˈsɛsin]	bastiguesse [bastiˈgese] bastiguesses [bastiˈgese] bastiguesse [bastiˈgese] bastiguessiam [bastigeˈsjan] bastiguessiatz [bastigeˈsja] bastiguesson [bastiˈgesu]	bastissi [basˈtisi] bastisses [basˈtises] bastisse [basˈtise] bastíssem [basˈtisem] bastíssetz [basˈtisets] bastissen [basˈtisen]	bastiguèsse [ba:tiˈgɛse] bastiguèsses [ba:tiˈgɛse] bastiguèsse [ba:tiˈgɛse] bastiguèssem [ba:tiˈgɛsen] bastiguèssetz [ba:tiˈgɛse] bastiguèssen [ba:tiˈgɛse]	bastiguèssi [bastiˈgɛsi] bastiguèsses [bastiˈgɛses] bastiguèsse [bastiˈgɛse] bastiguèssem [bastiˈgɛsen] bastiguèssetz [bastiˈgɛsets] bastiguèsson [bastiˈgɛsun]	bastiguèsse [bastiˈgɛse] bastiguèsses [bastiˈgɛses] bastiguèsse [bastiˈgɛse] bastiguessiam [bastigeˈsjan] bastiguessiatz [bastigeˈsjas] bastiguèsson [bastiˈgɛsun]	bastís [basˈtis] bastisses [basˈtises] bastís [basˈtis] bastissem [bastiˈsem] bastissetz [bastiˈsets] bastissen [basˈtisen]	bastís bastissis bastís bastíssim bastíssiu bastissin
Future perfect
		bastiri [basˈtiɾi] bastires [basˈtiɾes] bastire [basˈtiɾe] bastírem [basˈtiɾem] bastíretz [basˈtiɾets] bastiren [basˈtiɾen]					

== Third group verbs (-re verbs) ==
This is the third regular group of verbs in the Occitan language. The letter immediately before the -re ending is always a consonant. Examples include pèrdre ("to lose"), recebre ("to receive"), medre ("to harvest") and sègre ("to follow"). If the consonant is a b or a g, then the third person singular of present indicative will be spelt with a p or a c instead. Consequently, recebre and sègre will give recep and sèc while pèrdre and medre will become pèrd and med, respectively.

=== Batre ("to beat") ===
- Note: Because the Languedocian dialect is often considered as a basis for standard Occitan, the standard is colored gold.

Aupenc	Auvernhàs	Gascon	Lemosin	Lengadocian	Provençau	Old Occitan	Catalan
Infinitive
batre [ˈbatɾe]	batre [ˈbatɾe]	bàter [ˈbate]	batre [ˈbatɾe]	batre [ˈbatɾe]	batre [ˈbatɾe]	batre [ˈbatɾe]	batre
Past participle
batut [baˈty] batua [baˈtyɔ]	batut [baˈty] batuda [baˈtydɔ]	batut [baˈtyt] batuda [baˈtyðɔ]	batut [baˈty] batuda [baˈtydɔ]	batut [baˈtyt] batuda [baˈtyðɔ]	batut [baˈty] batuda [baˈtydɔ]	batut [baˈtyt] batuda [baˈtyda]	batut batuda
Present participle
batent [baˈtent]	batent [baˈten]	batent [baˈtent]	batent [baˈten]	batent [baˈtent]	batent [baˈtent]	baten [baˈten]	batent
Imperative
bate! [ˈbate] batem! [baˈten] batètz! [baˈtɛs]	bat! [bat] bateguessiam! [bategeˈsjan] batetz! [baˈte]	bat! [bat] batiam! [baˈtjam] batetz! [baˈtets]	bat! [ba] batam! [baˈtan] batetz! [baˈte]	bat! [bat] batam! [baˈtan] batètz! [baˈtɛts]	bate! [ˈbate] batem! [baˈten] batètz! [baˈtɛs]	bat! [bat] batam! [baˈtam] batetz! [baˈtets]	bat! batem! bateu!
Present indicative
bato [ˈbatu] bates [ˈbates] bate [ˈbate] batèm [baˈtɛn] batètz [baˈtɛs] baton [ˈbatun]	bate [ˈbate] bates [ˈbate] bat [bat] batam [baˈtan] batetz [baˈte] baton [ˈbatu]	bati [ˈbati] bates [ˈbates] bat [bat] batem [baˈtem] batetz [baˈtets] baten [ˈbaten]	bate [ˈbate] bates [ˈbatej] bat [bat] batem [baˈten] batetz [baˈtej] baton [ˈbatu]	bati [ˈbati] bates [ˈbates] bat [bat] batèm [baˈtɛn] batètz [baˈtɛts] baton [ˈbatun]	bate [ˈbate] bates [ˈbates] bat [bat] batèm [baˈtɛn] batètz [baˈtɛs] baton [ˈbatun]	bati [ˈbati] batz [ˈbats] bat [bat] batem [baˈtem] batetz [baˈtets] baton [ˈbatun]	bato bats bat batem bateu baten
Imperfect indicative
batiáu [baˈtjew] batiás [baˈtjes] batiá [baˈtje] batiam [baˈtjan] batiatz [baˈtjas] batián [baˈtjen]	batiá [baˈtjɔ] batiàs [baˈtja] batiá [baˈtjɔ] batiam [baˈtjan] batia [baˈtjats] batián [baˈtjɔ]	batèvi [baˈtɛwi] batèvas [baˈtɛwɔs] batèva [baˈtɛwɔ] batèvam [baˈtɛwam] batèvatz [baˈtɛwats] batèvan [baˈtɛwɔn]	batiá [baˈtjɔ] batiàs [baˈtja] batiá [baˈtjɔ] batiam [baˈtjan] batiatz [baˈtja] batián [baˈtjɔ]	batiái [baˈtjɔj] batiás [baˈtjɔs] batiá [baˈtjɔ] batiam [baˈtjan] batiatz [baˈtjats] batián [baˈtjɔn]	batiáu [baˈtjew] batiás [baˈtjes] batiá [baˈtje] batiam [baˈtjan] batiatz [baˈtjas] batián [baˈtjen]	batia [baˈtia] batias [baˈtias] batia [baˈtia] batiam [baˈtjam] batiatz [baˈtjats] batian [baˈtian]	batia baties batia batíem batíeu batien
Preterite indicative
batèro [baˈtɛɾu] batères [baˈtɛɾes] batèc [baˈtɛk] bateriam [bateˈrjan] bateriatz [bateˈrjas] batèron [baˈtɛɾun]	bateguere [bateˈgere] bategueres [bateˈgeɾe] bateguet [bateˈget] bateguem [bateˈgen] bateguetz [bateˈge] bategueron [bateˈgeɾu]	batoi [baˈtuj] batós [baˈtus] bató [baˈtu] batom [baˈtum] batotz [baˈtuts] batón [baˈtun]	batei [baˈtej] bateras [baˈteɾa] batet [baˈte] batèram [baˈtɛɾan] batèratz [baˈtɛɾa] batèran [baˈtɛɾɔ]	batèri [baˈtɛɾi] batères [baˈtɛɾes] batèt [baˈtɛt] batèrem [baˈtɛɾen] batèretz [baˈtɛɾets] batèron [baˈtɛɾun]	bateguère [bateˈgɛɾe] bateguères [bateˈgɛɾes] bateguèt [bateˈgɛt] bategueriam [bategeˈrjan] bategueriatz [bategeˈrjas] bateguèron [bateˈgɛɾun]	batei [baˈtej] batest [baˈtest] batet [baˈtet] batem [baˈtem] batetz [baˈtets] bateron [baˈteɾun]	batí bateres baté batérem batéreu bateren
Future indicative
batrai [ba'tɾaj] batrás [ba'tɾes] batrá [ba'tɾe] batrem [ba'tɾen] batretz [ba'tɾes] batrán [ba'tɾen]	batrai [ba'tɾaj] batràs [ba'tɾa] batrá [ba'tɾɔ] batrem [ba'tɾen] batretz [ba'tɾe] batrán [ba'tɾɔ]	baterèi [bate'ɾɛj] bateràs [bate'ɾas] baterà [bate'ɾa] bateram [bate'ɾam] bateratz [bate'ɾats] bateràn [bate'ɾan]	batrai [ba'tɾaj] batràs [ba'tɾa] batrá [ba'tɾɔ] batrem [ba'tɾen] batretz [ba'tɾe] batrán [ba'tɾɔ]	batrai [ba'tɾaj] batràs [ba'tɾas] batrà [ba'tɾa] batrem [ba'tɾen] batretz [ba'tɾets] batràn [ba'tɾan]	batrai [ba'tɾaj] batràs [ba'tɾas] batrà [ba'tɾa] batrem [ba'tɾen] batretz [ba'tɾes] batràn [ba'tɾan]	batrai [ba'tɾaj] batràs [ba'tɾas] batrà [ba'tɾa] batrem [ba'tɾem] batretz [ba'tɾets] batràn [ba'tɾan]	batré batràs batrà batrem batreu batran
Conditional
batriáu [baˈtɾjew] batriás [baˈtɾjes] batriá [baˈtɾje] batriam [baˈtɾjan] batriatz [baˈtɾjas] batrián [baˈtɾjen]	batriá [baˈtɾjɔ] batriás [baˈtɾjɔ] batriá [baˈtɾjɔ] batriam [baˈtɾjan] batriatz [baˈtɾja] batrián [baˈtɾjɔ]	baterí [bateˈɾi] baterés [bateˈɾes] bateré [bateˈɾe] baterem [bateˈɾem] bateretz [bateˈɾets] baterén [bateˈɾen]	batriá [baˈtɾjɔ] batriàs [baˈtɾja] batriá [baˈtɾjɔ] batriam [baˈtɾjan] batriatz [baˈtɾja] batrián [baˈtɾjɔ]	batriái [baˈtɾjɔj] batriás [baˈtɾjɔs] batriá [baˈtɾjɔ] batriam [baˈtɾjan] batriatz [baˈtɾjats] batrián [baˈtɾjɔn]	batriáu [baˈtɾjew] batriás [baˈtɾjes] batriá [baˈtɾje] batriam [baˈtɾjan] batriatz [baˈtɾjas] batrián [baˈtɾjen]	batria [baˈtɾia] batrias [baˈtɾias] batria [baˈtɾia] batriam [baˈtɾjam] batriatz [baˈtɾjats] batrian [baˈtɾian]	batria batries batria batríem batríeu batrien
Present subjunctive
bàtio [ˈbatju] bàtias [ˈbatis] bàtia [ˈbati] batiam [baˈtjan] batiatz [baˈtjas] bàtian [ˈbatin]	bàtie [ˈbatje] bàties [ˈbatje] bàtie [ˈbatje] bateguessiam [bategeˈsjan] bateguessiatz [bategeˈsja] bàtion [ˈbatju]	bati [ˈbati] bàtias [ˈbatjɔs] bàtia [ˈbatjɔ] batiam [baˈtjam] batiatz [baˈtjats] bàtian [ˈbatjɔn]	bata [ˈbatɔ] batas [ˈbata] bata [ˈbatɔ] batam [baˈtan] batatz [baˈta] batan [ˈbatɔ]	bata [ˈbatɔ] batas [ˈbatɔs] bata [ˈbatɔ] batam [baˈtan] batatz [baˈtats] batan [ˈbatɔn]	bata [ˈbatɔ] batas [ˈbatɔs] bata [ˈbatɔ] batam [baˈtan] batatz [baˈtas] batan [ˈbatɔn]	bata [ˈbata] batas [ˈbatas] bata [ˈbata] batam [baˈtam] batatz [baˈtats] batan [ˈbatan]	bati batis bati batem bateu batin
Imperfect subjunctive
batèssio [baˈtɛsju] batèssias [baˈtɛsis] batèssia [baˈtɛsi] batessiam [bateˈsjan] batessiatz [bateˈsjas] batèssian [baˈtɛsin]	bateguesse [bateˈgese] bateguesses [bateˈgese] bateguesse [bateˈgese] bateguessiam [bategeˈsjan] bateguessiatz [bategeˈsja] bateguesson [bateˈgesu]	batossi [baˈtusi] batosses [baˈtuses] batosse [baˈtuse] batóssem [baˈtusem] batóssetz [baˈtusets] batossen [baˈtusen]	batèsse [baˈtɛse] batèsses [baˈtɛse] batèsse [baˈtɛse] batèssem [baˈtɛsen] batèssetz [baˈtɛse] batèssen [baˈtɛse]	batèssi [baˈtɛsi] batèsses [baˈtɛses] batèsse [baˈtɛse] batèssem [baˈtɛsen] batèssetz [baˈtɛsets] batèsson [baˈtɛsun]	bateguèsse [bateˈgɛse] bateguèsses [bateˈgɛses] bateguèsse [bateˈgɛse] bateguessiam [bategeˈsjan] bateguessiatz [bategeˈsjas] bateguèsson [bateˈgɛsun]	batés [baˈtes] batesses [baˈteses] batés [baˈtes] batessem [bateˈsem] batessetz [bateˈsets] batessen [baˈtesen]	batés batessis batés batéssim batéssiu batessin
Future perfect
		batori [baˈtuɾi] batores [baˈtuɾes] batore [baˈtuɾe] batórem [baˈtuɾem] batóretz [baˈtuɾets] batoren [baˈtuɾen]					

== Irregular verbs ==
=== Èsser ("to be") ===
- Note: Because the Languedocian dialect is often considered as a basis for standard Occitan, the standard is colored gold.

Aupenc	Auvernhàs	Gascon	Lemosin	Lengadocian	Provençau	Old Occitan	Catalan
Infinitive
èstre [ˈɛtɾe]	èstre [ˈɛjtɾe]	estar [esˈta]	èsser [ˈejse]	èsser [ˈɛse]	èstre [ˈɛstɾe]	esser [ˈeseɾ]	ésser
Past participle
estat [esˈta] estaa [esˈtaɔ]	esta [esˈta] estada [esˈtadɔ]	estat [esˈtat] estada [esˈtaðɔ]	estat [ejˈta] estada [ejˈtadɔ]	estat [esˈtat] estada [esˈtaðɔ]	estat [esˈta] estada [esˈtadɔ]	estat [esˈtat] estada [esˈtada]	estat estada
Present participle
estent [esˈtent]	estant [esˈtan]	estant [esˈtant]	essent [ejˈsen]	essent [eˈsent]	estent [esˈtent]	essen [eˈsen]	essent
Imperative
siéies! [ˈsjejes] sieiem! [sjeˈjen] sieietz! [sjeˈjes]	siage! [sjaˈdze] siajam! [sjaˈdzan] siajatz! [sjaˈdza]	sia! [ˈsijɔ] siam! [sjam] siatz! [sjats]	siá! [sjɔ] siam! [sjan] siatz! [sja]	siá! [sjɔ] siam! [sjan] siatz! [sjats]	siegues! [ˈsjeges] sieguem! [sjeˈgen] sieguetz! [sjeˈges]	sia! [ˈsia] siam! [sjam] siatz! [sjats]	sigues! siguem! sigueu!
Present indicative
siáu [sjew] siás [sjes] es [es] siam [sjan] siatz [sjas] son [sun]	sei [sej] siás [sjɔ] es [ej] sem [sen] setz [ses] son [sun]	soi [suj] ès [ɛs] ei [ej] èm [ɛm] ètz [ɛts] son [sun]	sei [sej] ses [sej] es [ej] sem [sen] setz [sej] son [sun]	soi [suj] siás [sjɔs] es [es] sèm [sɛn] sètz [sɛts] son [sun]	siáu [sjew] siás [sjes] es [es] siam [sjan] siatz [sjas] son [sun]	soi [suj] est [est] es [es] em [em] etz [ets] son [sun]	sóc ets és som sou són
Imperfect indicative
èro [ˈɛɾu] ères [ˈɛɾes] èra [ˈɛɾɔ] eriam [eˈɾjan] eriatz [eˈɾjas] èran [ˈɛɾɔn]	ere [ˈeɾe] eres [ˈeɾe] era [ˈeɾɔ] saiam [saˈjan] saiatz [saˈjas] eron [ˈeɾu]	èri [ˈɛɾi] èras [ˈɛɾɔs] èra [ˈɛɾɔ] èram [ˈɛɾam] èratz [ˈɛɾats] èran [ˈɛɾɔn]	èra [ˈɛɾɔ] èras [ˈɛɾa] èra [ˈɛɾɔ] eram [eˈɾan] eratz [eˈɾa] èran [ˈɛɾɔ]	èri [ˈɛɾi] èras [ˈɛɾɔs] èra [ˈɛɾɔ] èrem [ˈɛɾen] èretz [ˈɛɾets] èran [ˈɛɾɔn]	ère [ˈɛɾe] ères [ˈɛɾes] èra [ˈɛɾɔ] eriam [eˈɾjan] eriatz [eˈɾjas] èran [ˈɛɾɔn]	era [ˈeɾa] eras [ˈeɾas] era [ˈeɾa] eram [eˈɾam] eratz [eˈɾats] eran [ˈeɾan]	era eres era érem éreu eren
Preterite indicative
foguèro [fuˈgɛɾu] foguères [fuˈgɛɾes] foguèc [fuˈgɛk] fogueriam [fugeˈɾjan] fogueriatz [fugeˈɾias] foguèron [fuˈgɛɾun]	saguere [saˈgeɾe] sagueres [saˈgeɾe] saguet [saˈget] saguem [saˈgen] saguetz [saˈges] sagueron [saˈgeɾu]	estoi [esˈtuj] estós [esˈtus] estó [esˈtu] estom [esˈtum] estotz [esˈtuts] estón [esˈtun]	fuguei [fyˈgej] fugueras [fyˈgeɾa] fuguet [fyˈge] fuguèram [fyˈgɛɾan] fuguèratz [fyˈgɛɾa] fugueran [fyˈgeɾɔ]	foguèri [fuˈɣɛɾi] foguères [fuˈɣɛɾes] foguèt [fuˈɣɛt] foguèrem [fuˈɣɛɾen] foguèretz [fuˈɣɛɾets] foguèron [fuˈɣɛɾun]	fuguère [fyˈgɛɾe] fuguères [fyˈgɛɾes] fuguèt [fyˈgɛt] fugueriam [fygeˈɾjan] fugueriatz [fygeˈɾias] fuguèron [fyˈgɛɾun]	fui [fyj] fust [fyst] fon [fun] fom [fum] fotz [futs] foron [ˈfuɾun]	fui fores fou fórem fóreu fóren
Future indicative
sarai [sa'ɾaj] sarás [sa'ɾes] sará [sa'ɾe] sarem [sa'ɾen] saretz [sa'ɾes] sarán [sa'ɾen]	serai [se'ɾaj] seràs [se'ɾa] serà [se'ɾɔ] serem [se'ɾen] seretz [se'ɾe] serán [se'ɾɔ]	serèi [se'ɾɛj] seràs [se'ɾas] serà [se'ɾa] seram [se'ɾam] seratz [se'ɾats] seràn [se'ɾan]	serai [se'ɾaj] seràs [se'ɾa] será [se'ɾɔ] serem [se'ɾen] seretz [se'ɾe] serán [se'ɾɔ]	serai [se'ɾaj] seràs [se'ɾas] serà [se'ɾa] serem [se'ɾen] seretz [se'ɾets] seràn [se'ɾan]	sarai [sa'ɾaj] saràs [sa'ɾas] sarà [sa'ɾa] sarem [sa'ɾen] saretz [sa'ɾes] saràn [sa'ɾan]	serai [se'ɾaj] seràs [se'ɾas] serà [se'ɾa] serem [se'ɾem] seretz [se'ɾets] seràn [se'ɾan]	seré seràs serà serem sereu seran
Conditional
sariáu [saˈɾjew] sariás [saˈɾjes] sariá [saˈɾje] sariam [saˈɾjan] sariatz [saˈɾjas] sarián [saˈɾjen]	seriá [seˈɾjɔ] seriás [seˈɾjɔ] seriá [seˈɾjɔ] seriam [seˈɾjan] seriatz [seˈɾjas] serián [seˈɾjɔ]	serí [seˈɾi] serés [seˈɾes] seré [seˈɾe] serem [seˈɾem] seretz [seˈɾets] serén [seˈɾen]	seriá [seˈɾjɔ] seriàs [seˈɾja] seriá [seˈɾjɔ] seriam [seˈɾjan] seriatz [seˈɾja] serián [seˈɾjɔ]	seriái [seˈɾjɔj] seriás [seˈɾjɔs] seriá [seˈɾjɔ] seriam [seˈɾjan] seriatz [seˈɾjats] serián [seˈɾjɔn]	sariáu [saˈɾjew] sariás [saˈɾjes] sariá [saˈɾje] sariam [saˈɾjan] sariatz [saˈɾjas] sarián [saˈɾjen]	seria [seˈɾia] serias [seˈɾias] seria [seˈɾia] seriam [seˈɾjam] seriatz [seˈɾjats] serian [seˈɾian]	seria series seria seríem seríeu serien
Present subjunctive
siéio [ˈsjeju] siéies [ˈsjejes] siéie [ˈsjeje] sieiem [sjeˈjen] sieietz [sjeˈjes] siéian [ˈsjejɔn]	siage [ˈsjadze] siages [ˈsjadze] siage [ˈsjadze] siajam [sjaˈdzan] siajatz [sjaˈdzas] siajon [sjaˈdzu]	sii [ˈsiji] sias [ˈsijɔs] sia [ˈsijɔ] siam [sjam] siatz [sjats] sian [ˈsijɔn]	siá [sjɔ] siàs [sja] siá [sjɔ] siam [sjan] siatz [sja] sián [sjɔ]	siái [sjɔj] siás [sjɔs] siá [sjɔ] siam [sjan] siatz [sjats] sián [sjɔn]	fugue [ˈfyge] fugues [ˈfyges] fugue [ˈfyge] fuguem [fyˈgen] fuguetz [fyˈges] fugan [ˈfygɔn]	sia [ˈsia] sias [ˈsias] sia [ˈsia] siam [sjam] siatz [sjats] sian [ˈsian]	sigui siguis sigui siguem sigueu siguin
Imperfect subjunctive
foguèssio [fuˈgɛsju] foguèssias [fuˈgɛsis] foguèssia [fuˈgɛsi] foguessiam [fugeˈsjan] foguessiatz [fugeˈsjas] foguèssian [fuˈgɛsin]	saguesse [saˈgese] saguesses [saˈgese] saguesse [saˈgese] saguessiam [sageˈsjan] saguessiatz [sageˈsjas] saguesson [saˈgesu]	estossi [esˈtusi] estosses [esˈtuses] estosse [esˈtuse] estóssem [esˈtusem] estóssetz [esˈtusets] estossen [esˈtusen]	fuguèsse [fyˈgɛse] fuguèsses [fyˈgɛse] fuguèsse [fyˈgɛse] fuguèssem [fyˈgɛsen] fuguèssetz [fyˈgɛse] fuguèssen [fyˈgɛse]	foguèssi [fuˈgɛsi] foguèsses [fuˈgɛses] foguèsse [fuˈgɛse] foguèssem [fuˈgɛsen] foguèssetz [fuˈgɛsets] foguèsson [fuˈgɛsun]	fuguèsse [fyˈgɛse] fuguèsses [fyˈgɛses] fuguèsse [fyˈgɛse] fuguessiam [fygeˈsjan] fuguessiatz [fygeˈsjas] fuguèsson [fyˈgɛsun]	fos [fus] fosses [ˈfuses] fos [fus] fossem [fuˈsem] fossetz [fuˈsets] fossen [ˈfusen]	fos fossis fos fóssim fóssiu fossin
Future perfect
		estori [esˈtuɾi] estores [esˈtuɾes] estore [esˈtuɾe] estórem [esˈtuɾem] estóretz [esˈtuɾets] estoren [esˈtuɾen]					

=== Aver ("to have") ===
Aupenc	Auvernhàs	Gascon	Lemosin	Lengadocian	Provençau	Old Occitan	Catalan
Infinitive
aver [aˈveɾ]	avere [aˈveɾe]	aver [aˈwe]	aver [aˈve]	aver [aˈβe]	aver [aˈve]	aver [a'veɾ]	haver
Past participle
agut [aˈgy] agua [aˈgyɔ]	agut [aˈgy] aguda [aˈgydɔ]	avut [aˈwyt] avuda [aˈwyðɔ]	agut [aˈgy] aguda [aˈgydɔ]	agut [aˈɣyt] aguda [aˈɣyðɔ]	agut [aˈgy] aguda [aˈgydɔ]	agut [aˈgyt] aguda [aˈgyda]	hagut haguda
Present participle
avent [aˈvent]	aguent [aˈgen]	avent [aˈwent]	avent [aˈven]	avent [aˈɣent]	avent [aˈvent]	aven [a'ven]	havent
Imperative
aies! [ˈajes] aiem! [aˈjen] aietz! [aˈjes]	age! [aˈdze] ajam! [aˈdzan] ajatz! [aˈdza]	aja! [ˈaʒɔ] ajam! [aˈʒam] ajatz! [aˈʒats]	aia! [ˈajɔ] aiam! [aˈjan] aiatz! [aˈja]	aja! [ˈadʒɔ] ajam! [adˈʒan] ajatz! [adˈʒats]	agues! [ˈages] aguem! [aˈgen] aguetz! [aˈges]	aias! [ˈajas] aiam! [aˈjam] aiatz! [aˈjats]	haig / heu! haig / haguem! haig / haveu!
Present indicative
ai [aj] as [as] a [a] avèm [aˈvɛn] avètz [aˈvɛs] an [an]	ai [aj] as [a] a [ɔ] avem [aˈven] avetz [aˈve] an [ɔn]	èi [ɛj] as [as] a [a] avem [aˈwem] avetz [aˈwets] an [an]	ai [aj] as [a] a [a] avem [aˈven] avetz [aˈvej] an [an]	ai [aj] as [as] a [a] avèm [aˈβɛn] avètz [aˈβɛts] an [an]	ai [aj] as [as] a [a] avèm [aˈvɛn] avètz [aˈvɛs] an [an]	ai [aj] as [as] a [a] avem [aˈvem] avetz [aˈvets] an [an]	haig/he has ha h(av)em h(av)eu han
Imperfect indicative
aviáu [aˈvjew] aviás [aˈvjes] aviá [aˈvje] aviam [aˈvjan] aviatz [aˈvjas] avián [aˈvjen]	aviá [aˈvjɔ] aviàs [aˈvja] aviá [aˈvjɔ] aviam [aˈvjan] aviatz [aˈvjas] avián [aˈvjɔ]	avèvi/aví [aˈ(wɛ)wi] avè(va)s [aˈwɛ(wɔ)s] avè(va) [aˈwɛ(wɔ)] avè(va)m [aˈwɛ(wa)m] avè(va)tz [aˈwɛ(wa)ts] avè(va)n [aˈwɛ(wɔ)n]	aviá [aˈvjɔ] aviàs [aˈvja] aviá [aˈvjɔ] aviam [aˈvjan] aviatz [aˈvja] avián [aˈvjɔ]	aviái [aˈβjɔj] aviás [aˈβjɔs] aviá [aˈβjɔ] aviam [aˈβjan] aviatz [aˈβjats] avián [aˈβjɔn]	aviáu [aˈvjew] aviás [aˈvjes] aviá [aˈvje] aviam [aˈvjan] aviatz [aˈvjas] avián [aˈvjen]	avia [aˈvia] avias [aˈvias] avia [aˈvia] aviam [aˈvjam] aviatz [aˈvjatz] avian [aˈvian]	havia havies havia havíem havíeu havien
Preterite indicative
aguèro [aˈgɛɾu] aguères [aˈgɛɾes] aguèc [aˈgɛk] agueriam [ageˈɾjan] agueriatz [ageˈɾias] aguèron [aˈgɛɾun]	aguere [aˈgeɾe] agueres [aˈgeɾes] aguet [aˈge] aguem [aˈgen] aguetz [aˈges] agueron [aˈgeɾu]	avoi [aˈwuj] avós [aˈwus] avó [aˈwu] avom [aˈwum] avotz [aˈwuts] avón [aˈwun]	aguei [aˈgej] agueras [aˈgeɾa] aguet [aˈge] aguèram [aˈgɛɾan] aguèratz [aˈgɛɾa] agueran [aˈgeɾɔ]	aguèri [aˈɣɛɾi] aguères [aˈɣɛɾes] aguèt [aˈɣɛt] aguèrem [aˈɣɛɾen] aguèretz [aˈɣɛɾets] aguèron [aˈɣɛɾun]	aguère [aˈgɛɾe] aguères [aˈgɛɾes] aguèt [aˈgɛt] agueriam [ageˈɾjan] agueriatz [ageˈɾias] aguèron [aˈgɛɾun]	aic [ajk] aguist [aˈgist] ac [ak] aguem [aˈgem] aguetz [aˈgets] agron [ˈagɾun]	haguí hagueres hagué haguérem haguéreu hagueren
Future indicative
aurai [aw'ɾaj] aurás [aw'ɾes] aurá [aw'ɾe] aurem [aw'ɾen] auretz [aw'ɾes] aurán [aw'ɾen]	aurai [aw'ɾaj] auràs [aw'ɾa] aurà [aw'ɾɔ] aurem [aw'ɾen] auretz [aw'ɾe] aurán [aw'ɾɔ]	aurèi [aw'ɾɛj] auràs [aw'ɾas] aurà [aw'ɾa] auram [aw'ɾam] auratz [aw'ɾats] auràn [aw'ɾan]	aurai [aw'ɾaj] auràs [aw'ɾa] aurá [aw'ɾɔ] aurem [aw'ɾen] auretz [aw'ɾe] aurán [aw'ɾɔ]	aurai [aw'ɾaj] auràs [aw'ɾas] aurà [aw'ɾa] aurem [aw'ɾen] auretz [aw'ɾets] auràn [aw'ɾan]	aurai [aw'ɾaj] auràs [aw'ɾas] aurà [aw'ɾa] aurem [aw'ɾen] auretz [aw'ɾes] auràn [aw'ɾan]	aurai [aw'ɾaj] auràs [aw'ɾas] aurà [aw'ɾa] aurem [aw'ɾem] auretz [aw'ɾetz] auràn [aw'ɾan]	hauré hauràs haurà haurem haureu hauran
Conditional
auriáu [awˈɾjew] auriás [awˈɾjes] auriá [awˈɾje] auriam [awˈɾjan] auriatz [awˈɾjas] aurián [awˈɾjen]	auriá [awˈɾjɔ] auriás [awˈɾjɔ] auriá [awˈɾjɔ] auriam [awˈɾjan] auriatz [awˈɾjas] aurián [awˈɾjɔ]	aurí [awˈɾi] aurés [awˈɾes] auré [awˈɾe] aurem [awˈɾem] auretz [awˈɾets] aurén [awˈɾen]	auriá [awˈɾjɔ] auriàs [awˈɾja] auriá [awˈɾjɔ] auriam [awˈɾjan] auriatz [awˈɾja] aurián [awˈɾjɔ]	auriái [awˈɾjɔj] auriás [awˈɾjɔs] auriá [awˈɾjɔ] auriam [awˈɾjan] auriatz [awˈɾjats] aurián [awˈɾjɔn]	auriáu [awˈɾjew] auriás [awˈɾjes] auriá [awˈɾje] auriam [awˈɾjan] auriatz [awˈɾjas] aurián [awˈɾjen]	auria [aw'ɾia] aurias [aw'ɾias] auria [aw'ɾia] auriam [aw'ɾjam] auriatz [aw'ɾjatz] aurian [aw'ɾian]	hauria / haguera hauries / hagueres hauria / haguera hauríem / haguérem hauríeu / haguéreu haurien / hagueren
Present subjunctive
aio [ˈaju] aias [ˈajis] aia [ˈaji] aiem [aˈjen] aietz [aˈjes] aian [ˈajin]	age [ˈadze] ages [ˈadze] age [ˈadze] ajam [aˈdzan] ajatz [aˈdza] ajon [ˈadzu]	agi [ˈaʒi] ajas [ˈaʒɔs] aja [ˈaʒɔ] ajam [a'ʒam] ajatz [aˈʒats] ajan [ˈaʒɔn]	aia [ˈajɔ] aias [ˈaja] aia [ˈajɔ] aiam [aˈjan] aiatz [aˈja] aian [ˈajɔ]	aja [ˈadʒɔ] ajas [ˈadʒɔs] aja [ˈadʒɔ] ajam [adˈʒan] ajatz [adˈʒats] ajan [ˈadʒɔn]	ague [ˈage] agues [ˈages] ague [ˈage] aguem [aˈgen] aguetz [aˈges] agan [ˈagɔn]	aia [ˈaja] aias [ˈajas] aia [ˈaja] aiam [aˈjam] aiatz [aˈjats] aian [ˈajan]	hagi / haja hagis / hages hagi / haja hàgim / hàgem hàgiu / hàgeu hagin / hagen
Imperfect subjunctive
aguèssio [aˈgɛsju] aguèssias [aˈgɛsis] aguèssia [aˈgɛsi] aguessiam [ageˈsjan] aguessiatz [ageˈsjas] aguèssian [aˈgɛsin]	aguesse [aˈgese] aguesses [aˈgese] aguesse [aˈgese] aguessiam [ageˈsjan] aguessiatz [ageˈsjas] aguesson [aˈgesu]	avossi [aˈwusi] avosses [aˈwuses] avosse [aˈwuse] avóssem [aˈwusem] avóssetz [aˈwusets] avossen [aˈwusen]	aguèsse [aˈgɛse] aguèsses [aˈgɛse] aguèsse [aˈgɛse] aguèssem [aˈgɛsen] aguèssetz [aˈgɛse] aguèssen [aˈgɛse]	aguèssi [aˈgɛsi] aguèsses [aˈgɛses] aguèsse [aˈgɛse] aguèssem [aˈgɛsen] aguèssetz [aˈgɛsets] aguèsson [aˈgɛsun]	aguèsse [aˈgɛse] aguèsses [aˈgɛses] aguèsse [aˈgɛse] aguessiam [ageˈsjan] aguessiatz [ageˈsjas] aguèsson [aˈgɛsun]	agués [a'ges] aguesses [a'geses] agués [a'ges] aguessem [age'sem] aguessetz [age'sets] aguessen [a'gesen]	hagués haguesses / haguessis hagués haguéssem / haguéssim haguésseu / haguéssiu haguessen / haguessin
Future perfect
		avori [aˈwuɾi] avores [aˈwuɾes] avore [aˈwuɾe] avórem [aˈwuɾem] avóretz [aˈwuɾets] avoren [aˈwuɾen]					

=== Anar ("to go") ===
Aupenc	Auvernhàs	Gascon	Lemosin	Lengadocian	Provençau	Old Occitan	Catalan
Infinitive
anar [aˈnaɾ]	anar [aˈna]	anar [aˈna]	anar [aˈna]	anar [aˈna]	anar [aˈna]	anar [aˈnaɾ]	anar
Past participle
anat [aˈna] anaa [aˈnaɔ]	anat [aˈna] anada [aˈnadɔ]	anat [aˈnat] anada [aˈnaðɔ]	anat [aˈna] anada [aˈnadɔ]	anat [aˈnat] anada [aˈnaðɔ]	anat [aˈna] anada [aˈnadɔ]	anat [aˈnat] anada [aˈnada]	anat anada
Present participle
anant [aˈnant]	anant [aˈnan]	anant [aˈnant]	anant [aˈnan]	anant [aˈnant]	anant [aˈnant]	anan [aˈnan]	anant
Imperative
vai! [vaj] anem! [aˈnen] anatz! [aˈnas]	vai! [vaj] vajam! [vaˈdzan] anatz! [aˈna]	vè! [bɛ] anem! [aˈnem] anatz! [aˈnats]	vai! [vaj] anem! [aˈnen] anatz! [aˈna]	vai! [baj] anem! [aˈnen] anatz! [aˈnats]	vai! [vaj] anem! [aˈnen] anatz! [aˈnas]	vai! [vaj] anem! [aˈnem] anatz! [aˈnats]	vés! anem! aneu!
Present indicative
vau [vaw] vas [vas] vai [vaj] anam [aˈnan] anatz [aˈnats] van [van]	vase [ˈvaze] vases [ˈvaze] vai [vaj] anam [aˈnan] anatz [aˈna] vason [ˈvazu]	vau [baw] vas [bas] va [ba] vam [bam] vatz [bats] van [ban]	vau [vaw] vas [va] vai [vaj] anam [aˈnan] / vam [van] anatz [aˈna] van [van]	vau [baw] vas [bas] va [ba] anèm [aˈnɛn] anètz [aˈnɛts] van [ban]	vau [vaw] vas [vas] vai [vaj] anam [aˈnan] anatz [aˈnats] van [van]	vauc [vawk] vais [vajs] vai [vaj] anam [aˈnam] anatz [aˈnats] van [van]	vaig vas va anem aneu van
Imperfect indicative
anavo [aˈnavu] anaves [aˈnaves] anava [aˈnavɔ] anaviam [anaˈvjan] anaviatz [anaˈvjas] anavan [aˈnavɔn]	anave [aˈnave] anaves [aˈnaves] anava [aˈnavɔ] anaviam [anaˈvjan] anaviatz [anaˈvjas] anavon [aˈnavu]	anavi [aˈnawi] anavas [aˈnawɔs] anava [aˈnawɔ] anàvam [aˈnawam] anàvatz [aˈnawats] anavan [aˈnawɔn]	anava [aˈnavɔ] anavas [aˈnava] anava [aˈnavɔ] anàvam [aˈnavan] anàvatz [aˈnava] anavan [aˈnavɔ]	anavi [aˈnaβi] anavas [aˈnaβɔs] anava [aˈnaβɔ] anàvem [aˈnaβen] anàvetz [aˈnaβets] anavan [aˈnaβɔn]	anave [aˈnave] anaves [aˈnaves] anava [aˈnavɔ] anaviam [anaˈvjan] anaviatz [anaˈvjas] anavan [aˈnavɔn]	anava [aˈnava] anavas [aˈnavas] anava [aˈnava] anavam [anaˈvam] anavatz [anaˈvats] anavan [aˈnavan]	anava anaves anava anàvem anàveu anaven
Preterite indicative
anèro [aˈnɛɾu] anères [aˈnɛɾes] anèc [aˈnɛk] aneriam [aneˈɾjan] aneriatz [aneˈɾjas] anèron [aˈnɛɾun]	anere [aˈneɾe] aneres [aˈneɾes] anet [aˈne] anem [aˈnen] anetz [aˈnes] aneron [aˈneɾu]	anèi [aˈnɛj] anès [aˈnɛs] anè [aˈnɛ] anèm [aˈnɛm] anètz [aˈnɛts] anèn [aˈnɛn]	anei [aˈnej] aneras [aˈneɾa] anet [aˈne] anèram [aˈnɛɾɔn] anèratz [aˈnɛɾa] aneran [aˈneɾɔ]	anèri [aˈnɛɾi] anères [aˈnɛɾes] anèt [aˈnɛt] anèrem [aˈnɛɾen] anèretz [aˈnɛɾets] anèron [aˈnɛɾun]	anère [aˈnɛɾe] anères [aˈnɛɾes] anèt [aˈnɛt] aneriam [aneˈɾjan] aneriatz [aneˈɾjas] anèron [aˈnɛɾun]	anei [aˈnej] anest [aˈnest] anet [aˈnet] anem [aˈnem] anetz [aˈnetz] aneron [aˈneɾun]	aní anares anà anàrem anàreu anaren
Future indicative
anarai [ana'ɾaj] anarás [ana'ɾes] anará [ana'ɾe] anarem [ana'ɾen] anaretz [ana'ɾes] anarán [ana'ɾen]	anarai [ana'ɾaj] anarás [ana'ɾɔ] anará [ana'ɾɔ] anarem [ana'ɾen] anaretz [ana'ɾe] anarán [ana'ɾɔ]	anarèi [ana'ɾɛj] anaràs [ana'ɾas] anarà [ana'ɾa] anaram [ana'ɾam] anaratz [ana'ɾats] anaràn [ana'ɾan]	anirai [ani'ɾaj] aniràs [ani'ɾa] anirá [ani'ɾɔ] anirem [ani'ɾen] aniretz [ani'ɾe] anirán [ani'ɾɔ]	anarai [ana'ɾaj] anaràs [ana'ɾas] anarà [ana'ɾa] anarem [ana'ɾen] anaretz [ana'ɾets] anaràn [ana'ɾan]	anarai [ana'ɾaj] anaràs [ana'ɾas] anarà [ana'ɾa] anarem [ana'ɾen] anaretz [ana'ɾes] anaràn [ana'ɾan]	anarai [ana'ɾaj] anaràs [ana'ɾas] anarà [ana'ɾa] anarem [ana'ɾem] anaretz [ana'ɾets] anaràn [ana'ɾan]	aniré aniràs anirà anirem anireu aniran
Conditional
anariáu [anaˈɾjew] anariás [anaˈɾjes] anariá [anaˈɾje] anariam [anaˈɾjan] anariatz [anaˈɾjas] anarián [anaˈɾjen]	anariá [anaˈɾjɔ] anariás [anaˈɾjɔ] anariá [anaˈɾjɔ] anariam [anaˈɾjan] anariatz [anaˈɾjas] anarián [anaˈɾjɔ]	anarí [anaˈɾi] anarés [anaˈɾes] anaré [anaˈɾe] anarem [anaˈɾem] anaretz [anaˈɾets] anarén [anaˈɾen]	aniriá [aniˈɾjɔ] aniriàs [aniˈɾja] aniriá [aniˈɾjɔ] aniriam [aniˈɾjan] aniriatz [aniˈɾja] anirián [aniˈɾjɔ]	anariái [anaˈɾjɔj] anariás [anaˈɾjɔs] anariá [anaˈɾjɔ] anariam [anaˈɾjan] anariatz [anaˈɾjats] anarián [anaˈɾjɔn]	anariáu [anaˈɾjew] anariás [anaˈɾjes] anariá [anaˈɾje] anariam [anaˈɾjan] anariatz [anaˈɾjas] anarián [anaˈɾjen]	anaria [anaˈɾia] anarias [anaˈɾias] anaria [anaˈɾia] anariam [anaˈɾjam] anariatz [anaˈɾjats] anarian [anaˈɾian]	aniria aniries aniria aniríem anaríreu anirien
Present subjunctive
ànio [ˈanju] ànias [ˈanis] ània [ˈani] aniam [aˈnjan] aniatz [aˈnjas] ànian [ˈanin]	vage [ˈvadze] vages [ˈvadze] vage [ˈvadze] vajam [vadˈzan] vajatz [vadˈzas] vajon [ˈvadzu]	ani [ˈani] anes [ˈanes] ane [ˈane] anem [aˈnem] anetz [aˈnets] anen [ˈanen]	ane [ˈane] anes [ˈane] ane [ˈane] anem [aˈnen] anetz [aˈne] anen [ˈane]	ane [ˈane] anes [ˈanes] ane [ˈane] anem [aˈnen] anetz [aˈnets] anen [ˈanen]	vague [ˈvage] vagues [ˈvages] vague [ˈvage] anem [aˈnen] anetz [aˈnes] vagan [ˈvagɔn]	an [an] anz [anz] an [an] anem [aˈnem] anetz [aˈnets] anen [ˈanen]	vagi vagis vagi anem aneu vagin
Imperfect subjunctive
anèssio [aˈnɛsju] anèssias [aˈnɛsis] anèssia [aˈnɛsi] anessiam [aneˈsjan] anessiatz [aneˈsjas] anèssian [aˈnɛsin]	anesse [aˈnese] anesses [aˈnese] anesse [aˈnese] anessiam [aneˈsjan] anessiatz [aneˈsjas] anesson [aˈnesu]	anèssi [aˈnɛsi] anèsses [aˈnɛses] anèsse [aˈnɛse] anèssem [aˈnɛsem] anèssetz [aˈnɛsets] anèssen [aˈnɛsen]	anèsse [aˈnɛse] anèsses [aˈnɛse] anèsse [aˈnɛse] anèssem [aˈnɛsen] anèssetz [aˈnɛse] anèssen [aˈnɛse]	anèssi [aˈnɛsi] anèsses [aˈnɛses] anèsse [aˈnɛse] anèssem [aˈnɛsen] anèssetz [aˈnɛsets] anèsson [aˈnɛsun]	anèsse [aˈnɛse] anèsses [aˈnɛses] anèsse [aˈnɛse] anessiam [aneˈsjan] anessiatz [aneˈsjas] anèsson [aˈnɛsun]	anés [aˈnes] anesses [aˈneses] anés [aˈnes] anessem [aneˈsem] anessetz [aneˈsets] anessen [aˈnesen]	anés anessis anés anéssim anéssiu anessin
Future perfect
		anèri [aˈnɛɾi] anères [aˈnɛɾes] anère [aˈnɛɾe] anèrem [aˈnɛɾem] anèretz [aˈnɛɾets] anèren [aˈnɛɾen]					

=== Far ("to do") ===
Aupenc	Auvernhàs	Gascon	Lemosin	Lengadocian	Provençau	Old Occitan	Catalan
Infinitive
far [faɾ]	far [fa]	har [ha]	far [fa]	far [fa]	far [fa]	far [faɾ]	fer
Past participle
fach [fa] facha [ˈfatʃɔ]	fait [faj] faita [ˈfajtɔ]	hèit [ˈhɛjt] hèita [ˈhɛjtɔ]	fach [fa] facha [ˈfatsɔ]	fach [fatʃ] facha [ˈfatʃɔ]	fach [fa] facha [ˈfatʃɔ]	fach [fatʃ] facha [ˈfatʃa]	fet feta
Present participle
fasent [faˈzent]	fasent [faˈzen]	hant [hant]	fasent [faˈzen]	fasent [faˈzent]	fasent [faˈzent]	fazen [faˈzen]	fent
Imperative
fai! [faj] fasèm! [faˈzɛn] fasètz! [faˈzɛs]	fai! [faj] fajam! [fadˈzan] fasetz! [faˈze]	hè! [hɛ] hèm! [hɛm] hètz! [hɛts]	fai! [faj] fajam! [fadˈzan] fasetz! [faˈze]	fai! [faj] fagam! [faˈgan] fasètz! [faˈzɛts]	fai! [faj] fasèm! [faˈzɛn] fasètz! [faˈzɛs]	fai! [faj] fazem! [faˈzem] fatz! [fats]	fes! fem! feu!
Present indicative
fau [faw] fas [fas] fa [fa] fasèm [faˈzɛn] fasètz [faˈzɛts] fan [fan]	fase [ˈfaze] fases [ˈfaze] fai [faj] fasem [faˈzen] fasetz [faˈzes] fason [ˈfazu]	hèi [hɛj] hès [hɛs] hè [hɛ] hèm [hɛm] hètz [hɛts] hèn [hɛn]	fau [faw] fas [fa] fai [faj] fasem [faˈzen] fasetz [faˈzej] fan [fan]	fau [faw] fas [fas] fa [fa] fasèm [faˈzɛn] fasètz [faˈzɛts] fan [fan]	fau [faw] fas [fas] fai [faj] fasèm [faˈzɛn] fasètz [faˈzɛts] fan [fan]	fauc [fawk] fas [fas] fa [fa] fam [fam] fatz [fats] fan [fan]	faig fas fa fem feu fan
Imperfect indicative
fasiáu [faˈzjew] fasiás [faˈzjes] fasiá [faˈzje] fasiam [faˈzjan] fasiatz [faˈzjas] fasián [faˈzjen]	fasiá [faˈzjɔ] fasiàs [faˈzja] fasiá [faˈzjɔ] fasiam [faˈzjan] fasiatz [faˈzjas] fasián [faˈzjɔ]	hasèvi [haˈzɛwi] hasèvas [haˈzɛwɔs] hasèva [haˈzɛwɔ] hasèvam [haˈzɛwam] hasèvatz [haˈzɛwats] hasèvan [haˈzɛwɔn]	fasiá [faˈzjɔ] fasiàs [faˈzja] fasiá [faˈzjɔ] fasiam [faˈzjan] fasiatz [faˈzja] fasián [faˈzjɔ]	fasiái [faˈzjɔj] fasiás [faˈzjɔs] fasiá [faˈzjɔ] fasiam [faˈzjan] fasiatz [faˈzjats] fasián [faˈzjɔn]	fasiáu [faˈzjew] fasiás [faˈzjes] fasiá [faˈzje] fasiam [faˈzjan] fasiatz [faˈzjas] fasián [faˈzjen]	fazia [faˈzia] fazias [faˈzias] fazia [faˈzia] faziam [faˈzjam] faziatz [faˈzjats] fazian [faˈzian]	feia feies feia fèiem fèieu feien
Preterite indicative
faguèro [faˈgɛɾu] faguères [faˈgɛɾes] faguèc [faˈgɛk] fagueriam [fageˈɾjan] fagueriatz [fageˈɾias] faguèron [faˈgɛɾun]	faguere [faˈgeɾe] fagueres [faˈgeɾe] faguet [faˈget] faguem [faˈgen] faguetz [faˈges] fagueron [faˈgeɾu]	hasoi [haˈzuj] hasós [haˈzus] hasó [haˈzu] hasom [haˈzum] hasotz [haˈzuts] hasón [haˈzun]	faguei [faˈgej] fagueras [faˈgeɾa] faguet [faˈge] faguèram [faˈgɛɾan] faguèratz [faˈgɛɾa] fagueran [faˈgeɾɔ]	faguèri [faˈgɛɾi] faguères [faˈgɛɾes] faguèt [faˈgɛt] faguèrem [faˈgɛɾen] faguèretz [faˈgɛɾets] faguèron [faˈgɛɾun]	faguère [faˈgɛɾe] faguères [faˈgɛɾes] faguèt [faˈgɛt] fagueriam [fageˈɾjan] fagueriatz [fageˈɾias] faguèron [faˈgɛɾun]	fis [fis] fezist [feˈzist] fetz [fets] fezem [feˈzem] fezetz [feˈzets] feiron [ˈfejɾun]	fiu feres féu férem féreu feren
Future indicative
farai [fa'ɾaj] farás [fa'ɾes] fará [fa'ɾe] farem [fa'ɾen] faretz [fa'ɾes] farán [fa'ɾen]	farai [fa'ɾaj] faràs [fa'ɾa] farà [fa'ɾɔ] farem [fa'ɾen] faretz [fa'ɾes] farán [fa'ɾɔ]	harèi [ha'ɾɛj] haràs [ha'ɾas] harà [ha'ɾa] haram [ha'ɾam] haratz [ha'ɾats] haràn [ha'ɾan]	farai [fa'ɾaj] faràs [fa'ɾa] fará [fa'ɾɔ] farem [fa'ɾen] faretz [fa'ɾe] farán [fa'ɾɔ]	farai [fa'ɾaj] faràs [fa'ɾas] farà [fa'ɾa] farem [fa'ɾen] faretz [fa'ɾets] faràn [fa'ɾan]	farai [fa'ɾaj] faràs [fa'ɾas] farà [fa'ɾa] farem [fa'ɾen] faretz [fa'ɾes] faràn [fa'ɾan]	farai [fa'ɾaj] faràs [fa'ɾas] farà [fa'ɾa] farem [fa'ɾem] faretz [fa'ɾets] faràn [fa'ɾan]	faré faràs farà farem fareu faran
Conditional
fariáu [faˈɾjew] fariás [faˈɾjes] fariá [faˈɾje] fariam [faˈɾjan] fariatz [faˈɾjas] farián [faˈɾjen]	fariá [faˈɾjɔ] fariás [faˈɾjɔ] fariá [faˈɾjɔ] fariam [faˈɾjan] fariatz [faˈɾjas] farián [faˈɾjɔ]	harí [haˈɾi] harés [haˈɾes] haré [haˈɾe] harem [haˈɾem] haretz [haˈɾets] harén [haˈɾen]	fariá [faˈɾjɔ] fariàs [faˈɾja] fariá [faˈɾjɔ] fariam [faˈɾjan] fariatz [faˈɾja] farián [faˈɾjɔ]	fariái [faˈɾjɔj] fariás [faˈɾjɔs] fariá [faˈɾjɔ] fariam [faˈɾjan] fariatz [faˈɾjats] farián [faˈɾjɔn]	fariáu [faˈɾjew] fariás [faˈɾjes] fariá [faˈɾje] fariam [faˈɾjan] fariatz [faˈɾjas] farián [faˈɾjen]	faria [faˈɾia] farias [faˈɾias] faria [faˈɾia] fariam [faˈɾjam] fariatz [faˈɾjats] farian [faˈɾian]	faria faries faria fariem farieu farien
Present subjunctive
fàcio [ˈfasju] fàcias [ˈfasis] fàcia [ˈfasi] faciam [faˈsjan] faciatz [faˈsjas] fàcian [ˈfasin]	fage [ˈfadze] fages [ˈfadze] fage [ˈfadze] faguessiam [fageˈsjan] faguessiatz [fageˈsjas] fajon [ˈfadzu]	haci [ˈhasi] hàcias [ˈhasjɔs] hàcia [ˈhasjɔ] haciam [haˈsjam] haciatz [haˈsjats] hàcian [ˈhasjɔn]	fasa [ˈfazɔ] fasas [ˈfaza] fasa [ˈfazɔ] fasam [faˈzan] fasatz [faˈza] fasan [ˈfazɔ]	faga [ˈfaɣɔ] fagas [ˈfaɣɔs] faga [ˈfaɣɔ] fagam [faˈɣan] fagatz [faˈɣats] fagan [ˈfaɣɔn]	fague [ˈfage] fagues [ˈfages] fague [ˈfage] faguem [faˈgen] faguetz [faˈges] fagan [ˈfagɔn]	fassa [ˈfasa] fassas [ˈfasas] fassa [ˈfasa] fassam [faˈsam] fassatz [faˈsats] fassan [ˈfasan]	faci facis faci fem feu facin
Imperfect subjunctive
faguèssio [faˈgɛsju] faguèssias [faˈgɛsis] faguèssia [faˈgɛsi] faguessiam [fageˈsjan] faguessiatz [fageˈsjas] faguèssian [faˈgɛsin]	faguesse [faˈgese] faguesses [faˈgese] faguesse [faˈgese] faguessiam [fageˈsjan] faguessiatz [fageˈsjas] faguesson [faˈgesu]	hasossi [haˈzusi] hasosses [haˈzuses] hasosse [haˈzuse] hasóssem [haˈzusem] hasóssetz [haˈzusets] hasossen [haˈzusen]	faguèsse [faˈgɛse] faguèsses [faˈgɛse] faguèsse [faˈgɛse] faguèssem [faˈgɛsen] faguèssetz [faˈgɛse] faguèssen [faˈgɛse]	faguèssi [faˈgɛsi] faguèsses [faˈgɛses] faguèsse [faˈgɛse] faguèssem [faˈgɛsen] faguèssetz [faˈgɛsets] faguèsson [faˈgɛsun]	faguèsse [faˈgɛse] faguèsses [faˈgɛses] faguèsse [faˈgɛse] faguessiam [fageˈsjan] faguessiatz [fageˈsjas] faguèsson [faˈgɛsun]	fezés [feˈzes] fezesses [feˈzeses] fezés [feˈzes] fezessem [fezeˈsem] fezessetz [fezeˈsets] fesson [ˈfesun]	fes fessis fes féssim féssiu fessin
Future perfect
		hasori [haˈzuɾi] hasores [haˈzuɾes] hasore [haˈzuɾe] hasórem [haˈzuɾem] hasóretz [haˈzuɾets] hasoren [haˈzuɾen]					

== See also ==
- Occitan phonology
- Romance verbs
- Catalan conjugation

== Literature ==
- Frederic Mistral: Lou Tresor dóu Felibrige
- François Juste Marie Raynouard: Grammaire romane, ou Grammaire de la langue des troubadours
- Camille Chabaneau: Grammaire limousine: phonétique, parties du discours, 1876
- F. Guessard: Grammaires provençales de Hugues Faidit et de Raymond Vidal de Besaudun (XIIIe siècle), 1858
- Carl Appel: Provenzalische Chrestomathie, mit Abriss der Formenlehre und Glossar, 1902
- C. H. Grandgent: An outline of the phonology and morphology of old Provençal, 1905
