= Conjugation of auxiliary Catalan verbs =

This table explains the conjugation of auxiliary Catalan verbs.

Models for the Conjugation of Auxiliary Catalan Verbs; Models per a la Conjugació dels Verbs Auxiliars en Català
SIMPLE TENSES - TEMPS SIMPLES
INFINITIVE- INFINITIU
PRONOUNS/PRONOMS (4)	(ÉS)SER	ESTAR	HAVER	ANAR	TENIR
GERUND - GERUNDI
	sent	estant	havent	anant	tenint
PARTICIPLE - PARTICIPI
	estat	estat	hagut	anat	tingut
INDICATIVE - INDICATIU
Present - Present
jo	sóc	estic	he/haig	vaig	tinc
tu	ets	estàs	has	vas	tens
ell/ella/vostè	és	està	ha	va	té
nosaltres	som	estem	hem	anem	tenim
vosaltres	sou	esteu	heu	aneu	teniu
ells/elles/vostès	són	estan	han	van	tenen
Imperfect - Imperfet
jo	era	estava	havia	anava	tenia
tu	eres	estaves	havies	anaves	tenies
ell/ella/vostè	era	estava	havia	anava	tenia
nosaltres	érem	estàvem	havíem	anàvem	teníem
vosaltres	éreu	estàveu	havíeu	avàveu	teníeu
ells/elles/vostès	eren	estaven	havien	anaven	tenien
Past - Passat (1)
jo	fui	estiguí	haguí	aní	tinguí
tu	fores	estigueres	hagueres	anares	tingueres
ell/ella/vostè	fou	estigué	hagué	anà	tingué
nosaltres	fórem	estiguérem	haguérem	anàrem	tinguérem
vosaltres	fóreu	estiguéreu	haguéreu	anàreu	tinguéreu
ells/elles/vostès	foren	estigueren	hagueren	anaren	tingueren
Future - Futur
jo	seré	estaré	hauré	aniré	tindré
tu	seràs	estaràs	hauràs	aniràs	tindràs
ell/ella/vostè	serà	estarà	haurà	anirà	tindrà
nosaltres	serem	estarem	haurem	anirem	tindrem
vosaltres	sereu	estareu	haureu	anireu	tindreu
ells/elles/vostès	seran	estaran	hauran	aniran	tindran
CONDITIONAL - CONDICIONAL
jo	seria	estaria	hauria	aniria	tindria
tu	series	estaries	hauries	aniries	tindries
ell/ella/vostè	seria	estaria	hauria	aniria	tindria
nosaltres	seríem	estaríem	hauríem	aniríem	tindríem
vosaltres	seríeu	estaríeu	hauríeu	aniríeu	tindríeu
ells/elles/vostès	serien	estarien	haurien	anirien	tindrien
SUBJUNCTIVE - SUBJUNTIU
Present - Present
jo	sigui	estigui	hagi	vagi	tingui
tu	siguis	estiguis	hagis	vagis	tinguis
ell/ella/vostè	sigui	estigui	hagi	vagi	tingui
nosaltres	siguem	estiguem	hàgim	anem	tinguem
vosaltres	sigueu	estigueu	hàgiu	aneu	tingueu
ells/elles/vostès	siguin	estiguin	hagin	vagin	tinguin
Imperfect - Imperfet
jo	fos	estigués	hagués	anés	tingués
tu	fossis	estiguessis	haguessis	anessis	tinguessis
ell/ella/vostè	fos	estigués	hagués	anés	tingués
nosaltres	fóssim	estiguéssim	haguéssim	anéssim	tinguéssim
vosaltres	fóssiu	estiguéssiu	haguéssiu	anéssiu	tinguéssiu
ells/elles/vostès	fossin	estiguessin	haguessin	anessin	tinguessin
IMPERATIVE - IMPERATIU
tu	sigues	estigues	(3)	vés	tingues
vostè	sigui	estigui		vagi	tingui
nosaltres	siguem	estiguem		anem	tinguem
vosaltres	sigueu	estigueu		aneu	tingueu
vostès	siguin	estiguin		vagin	tinguin
COMPOSITE TENSES - TEMPS COMPOSTOS
INFINITIVE PERFECT - INFINITIU PERFET
	haver estat	haver estat	(3)	haver anat	haver tingut
GERUND PERFECT - GERUNDI PERFET
	havent estat	havent estat		havent anat	havent tingut
INDICATIVE - INDICATIU
Perfect - Perfet
jo	he estat	he estat		he anat	he tingut
...	...	...		...	...
Pluperfect - Plusquamperfet
jo	havia estat	havia estat		havia anat	havia tingut
...	...	...		...	...
Past Anterior - Passat Anterior (1)
jo	haguí estat	haguí estat		haguí anat	haguí tingut
...	...	...		...	...
Periphrastic Past - Passat Perifràstic (1)
jo	vaig (és)ser	vaig estar		vaig anar	vaig tenir
tu	vas (és)ser	vas estar		vas anar	vas tenir
ell/ella/vostè	va (és)ser	va estar		va anar	va tenir
nosaltres	vam (és)ser	vam estar		vam anar	vam tenir
vosaltres	vau (és)ser	vau estar		vau anar	vau tenir
ells/elles/vostès	van (és)ser	van estar		van anar	van tenir
Periphrastic Past Anterior - Passat Anterior Perifràstic (1)
jo	vaig haver estat	vaig haver estat		vaig haver anat	vaig haver tingut
...	...	...		...	...
Future Perfect - Futur Perfet
jo	hauré estat	hauré estat		hauré anat	hauré tingut
...	...	...		...	...
CONDITIONAL - CONDICIONAL
Conditional Perfect - Condicional Perfet
jo	hauria estat	hauria estat		hauria anat	hauria tingut
...	...	...		...	...
SUBJUNCTIVE - SUBJUNTIU
Periphrastic Past - Passat Perifràstic (1)
jo	vagi (és)ser	vagi estar		vagi anar	vagi tenir
tu	vagis (és)ser	vas estar		vagis anar	vagis tenir
ell/ella/vostè	vagi (és)ser	vagi estar		vagi anar	vagi tenir
nosaltres	vàgim (és)ser	vàgim estar		vàgim anar	vàgim tenir
vosaltres	vàgiu (és)ser	vàgiu estar		vàgiu anar	vàgiu tenir
ells/elles/vostès	vagin (és)ser	vagin estar		vagin anar	vagin tenir
Perfect - Perfect
jo	hagi estat	hagi estat		hagi anat	hagi tingut
...	...	...		...	...
Pluperfect - Plusquamperfet
jo	hagués estat	hagués estat		hagués anat	hagués tingut
...	...	...		...	...
Periphrastic Past Anterior - Passat Anterior Perifràstic (1)
jo	vagi haver estat	vagi haver estat		vagi haver anat	vagi haver tingut
...	...	...		...	...

== Notes ==
1. The past, also called preterite, is rarely used in the spoken and written language and the same applies for the past anterior in both indicative and subjunctive moods (because it has the past form of haver in the composite form). In the modern language, the periphrastic past and the periphrastic past anterior replace the past and the past anterior. The main auxiliary verb is anar, but one must pay attention that it is conjugated in a slightly different way than the actual anar (a non-auxiliary verb expressing the meaning 'to go'). e.g. (Jo) vaig anar = I went.
2. The participle must agree with the noun in grammatical gender (masculine or feminine) and number (singular or plural).
3. Haver is never used in the imperative and all of the composite tenses.
4. The personal pronouns are omitted in the spoken and written language, except only where to clear up the ambiguity and that is usually when the conjugated verbs look similar (ex.: the conjugated first and third person singulars in the imperfect). The pronouns may also be used to empathize the verbs. In this list, the pronouns only serve as a guide for each grammatical person.

== See also ==
- Conjugation of regular Catalan verbs
