= Catalan conjugation =

Verb conjugation in the Catalan language

Catalan and Valencian conjugations (the Catalan and Valencian languages are spoken in Catalonia, Valencia, and in parts of Occitania}:

== Regular verbs ==
=== -ar verbs (cantar, 'to sing') ===
| Non-finite | Form | | | | | |
|---|---|---|---|---|---|---|
| Infinitive | cantar | | | | | |
| Gerund | cantant | | | | | |
| Past participle | cantat (cantat, cantada, cantats, cantades) | | | | | |
| Indicative | jo | tu | ell / ella (vostè) | nosaltres | vosaltres (vós) | ells / elles (vostès) |
| Present | canto | cantes | canta | cantem | canteu | canten |
| Imperfect | cantava | cantaves | cantava | cantàvem | cantàveu | cantaven |
| Preterite | vaig cantar | vas/vares cantar | va cantar | vam/vàrem cantar | vau/vàreu cantar | van/varen cantar |
| Future | cantaré | cantaràs | cantarà | cantarem | cantareu | cantaran |
| Conditional | cantaria | cantaries | cantaria | cantaríem | cantaríeu | cantarien |
| Subjunctive | jo | tu | ell / ella (vostè) | nosaltres | vosaltres (vós) | ells / elles (vostès) |
| Present | canti | cantis | canti | cantem | canteu | cantin |
| Imperfect | cantés | cantessis | cantés | cantéssim | cantéssiu | cantessin |
| Imperative | jo | tu | ell / ella (vostè) | nosaltres | vosaltres (vós) | ells / elles (vostès) |
| | | canta | canti | cantem | canteu | cantin |

=== -er and -re verbs (batre, 'to beat') ===
| Non-finite | Form | | | | | |
|---|---|---|---|---|---|---|
| Infinitive | batre | | | | | |
| Gerund | batent | | | | | |
| Past participle | batut (batut, batuda, batuts, batudes) | | | | | |
| Indicative | jo | tu | ell / ella (vostè) | nosaltres | vosaltres (vós) | ells / elles (vostès) |
| Present | bato | bats | bat | batem | bateu | baten |
| Imperfect | batia | baties | batia | batíem | batíeu | batien |
| Preterite | vaig batre | vas batre | va batre | vam batre | vau batre | van batre |
| Future | batré | batràs | batrà | batrem | batreu | batran |
| Conditional | batria | batries | batria | batríem | batríeu | batrien |
| Subjunctive | jo | tu | ell / ella (vostè) | nosaltres | vosaltres (vós) | ells / elles (vostès) |
| Present | bati | batis | bati | batem | bateu | batin |
| Imperfect | batés | batessis | batés | batéssim | batéssiu | batessin |
| Imperative | jo | tu | ell / ella (vostè) | nosaltres | vosaltres (vós) | ells / elles (vostès) |
| | | bat | bati | batem | bateu | batin |

=== -ir verbs (sentir, 'to feel') ===
| Non-finite | Form | | | | | |
|---|---|---|---|---|---|---|
| Infinitive | sentir | | | | | |
| Gerund | sentint | | | | | |
| Past participle | sentit (sentit, sentida, sentits, sentides) | | | | | |
| Indicative | jo | tu | ell / ella (vostè) | nosaltres | vosaltres (vós) | ells / elles (vostès) |
| Present | sento | sents | sent | sentim | sentiu | senten |
| Imperfect | sentia | senties | sentia | sentíem | sentíeu | sentien |
| Preterite | vaig sentir | vas sentir | va sentir | vam sentir | vau sentir | van sentir |
| Future | sentiré | sentiràs | sentirà | sentirem | sentireu | sentiran |
| Conditional | sentiria | sentiries | sentiria | sentiríem | sentiríeu | sentirien |
| Subjunctive | jo | tu | ell / ella (vostè) | nosaltres | vosaltres (vós) | ells / elles (vostès) |
| Present | senti | sentis | senti | sentim | sentiu | sentin |
| Imperfect | sentís | sentissis | sentís | sentíssim | sentíssiu | sentissin |
| Imperative | jo | tu | ell / ella (vostè) | nosaltres | vosaltres (vós) | ells / elles (vostès) |
| | | sent | senti | sentim | sentiu | sentin |

== Auxiliary verbs ==
=== ésser/ser ('to be') ===
| Non-finite | Form | | | | | |
|---|---|---|---|---|---|---|
| Infinitive | ésser or ser | | | | | |
| Gerund | sent | | | | | |
| Past participle | sigut (sigut, siguda, siguts, sigudes) | | | | | |
| Indicative | jo | tu | ell / ella (vostè) | nosaltres | vosaltres (vós) | ells / elles (vostès) |
| Present | sóc | ets | és | som | sou | són |
| Imperfect | era | eres | era | érem | éreu | eren |
| Preterite | vaig ser | vas ser | va ser | vam ser | vau ser | van ser |
| Future | seré | seràs | serà | serem | sereu | seran |
| Conditional | sería | series | seria | seríem | seríeu | serien |
| Subjunctive | jo | tu | ell / ella (vostè) | nosaltres | vosaltres (vós) | ells / elles (vostès) |
| Present | sigui | siguis | sigui | siguem | sigueu | siguin |
| Imperfect | fos | fossis | fos | fossim | fossiu | fossin |
| Imperative | jo | tu | ell / ella (vostè) | nosaltres | vosaltres (vós) | ells / elles (vostès) |
| | | sigues | sigui | siguem | sigueu | siguin |

=== estar ('to be') ===
| Non-finite | Form | | | | | |
|---|---|---|---|---|---|---|
| Infinitive | estar | | | | | |
| Gerund | estant | | | | | |
| Past participle | estat (estat, estada, estats, estades) | | | | | |
| Indicative | jo | tu | ell / ella (vostè) | nosaltres | vosaltres (vós) | ells / elles (vostès) |
| Present | estic | estàs | està | estem | esteu | estan |
| Imperfect | estava | estaves | estava | estàvem | estàveu | estaven |
| Preterite | va estar | vas estar | va estar | vam estar | vau estar | van estar |
| Future | estaré | estaràs | estarà | estarem | estareu | estaran |
| Conditional | estaría | estaries | estaria | estaríem | estaríeu | estarien |
| Subjunctive | jo | tu | ell / ella (vostè) | nosaltres | vosaltres (vós) | ells / elles (vostès) |
| Present | estigui | estiguis | estigui | estiguem | estigueu | estiguin |
| Imperfect | estigués | estiguéssis | estigués | estiguéssim | estiguéssiu | estiguessin |
| Imperative | jo | tu | ell / ella (vostè) | nosaltres | vosaltres (vós) | ells / elles (vostès) |
| | | estigues | estigui | estiguem | estigueu | estiguin |
