= Catalan verbs =

Parts of speech in Catalan grammar

This article discusses the conjugation of verbs in a number of varieties of Catalan-Valencian, including Old Catalan. Each verbal form is accompanied by its phonetic transcription. Widely used dialectal forms are included, even if they are not considered standard in either of the written norms: those of the Institut d'Estudis Catalans (based on Central Catalan) and the Acadèmia Valenciana de la Llengua (based on common Valencian). Other dialectal forms exist, including those characteristic of minor dialects such as Ribagorçan and Algherese and transitional forms of major dialects (such as those spoken in the lower Ebro basin area around Tortosa and in the Empordà).

== Verb system in context ==
The Catalan verb system has grammatical categories similar to those of neighbouring Romance languages such as Spanish, Occitan, French, and Italian. The formal similarities with Occitan are most noticeable. There is a visible divergence between Catalan and Occitan in Catalan second-person plural endings: -au, -eu, -iu, instead of the Occitan -atz, -etz, -itz.

One feature of Catalan is the periphrastic preterite tense for referring to the remote past, which is constructed with characteristic present-tense forms of the verb anar (to go) and the infinitive of a verb (vaig parlar, vas/vares parlar, va parlar, vam/vàrem parlar, vau/vàreu parlar, van/varen parlar). This tense, rare in Romance languages and shared only with some Gascon and Aragonese (Benasque, Gistaín) dialects, seems to have existed in Catalan since at least the 13th century.

The simple preterite indicative, descending from the Latin perfect indicative, is primarily used in contemporary written Catalan. Although it has been largely replaced by the periphrastic preterite in the spoken language, the simple preterite indicative is still used in dialects such as central Valencian and the Catalan spoken on Ibiza.

Another difference between contemporary and Old Catalan is the shift in simple preterite indicative endings from an etymological to an analogous pattern in third-person plural: from the Old Catalan -é, -ast, -à, -am, -às, and -aren to the contemporary -í, -ares, -à, -àrem, -àreu, and -aren. This change occurred between the 13th and 15th centuries.

== Forms ==
=== Finite ===
The table below summarises the inflected forms.

2nd person singular informal forms of cantar ("to sing")
| Mood | Tense | | Imperfective | Perfective |
|---|---|---|---|---|
| Indicative | Present | | cantes | has cantat |
| Indicative | Past | Imperfect | cantaves | havies cantat |
| Indicative | Past | Remote | cantares | hagueres cantat |
| Indicative | Past | Periphrastic | va(re)s cantar | va(re)s haver cantat |
| Indicative | Future | | cantaràs | hauràs cantat |
| Conditional | | | cantaries | hauries cantat |
| Subjunctive | Present | | cantis | hagis cantat |
| Subjunctive | Past | | cantéssis | haguéssis cantat |
| Imperative | | | canta | — |

Finite Catalan verbs have an imperfective or perfective aspect.

Regular Catalan verbs have the following imperfective tenses:

- Simple present (present d'indicatiu), e.g. parlo ("I speak, I'm speaking")
- Imperfect preterite (pretèrit imperfet d'indicatiu), e.g. parlava ("I spoke, I was speaking")
- Simple future (futur simple), e.g. parlaré ("I will speak, I will be speaking")
- Simple conditional (condicional simple), e.g. parlaria ("I would speak, I would be speaking")
- Subjunctive simple present (present de subjuntiu), e.g. parli ("that I speak, me to speak")
- Subjunctive simple preterite (pretèrit imperfet de subjuntiu), e.g. parlés ("that I spoke")

Tenses in the subjunctive mood usually imply dependence on a subordinate clause and might express uncertainty or supposition.

Regular Catalan verbs have the following perfective tenses (formed with the auxiliary verb haver and the past participle of the conjugated verb), which correspond with those above:

- Indefinite preterite (pretèrit indefinit) (recent past, cf. English present perfect), e.g. he parlat ("I have spoken")
- Pluperfect (pretèrit plusquamperfet d'indicatiu) (cf. English past perfect), e.g. havia parlat ("I had spoken")
- Future perfect (futur compost), e.g. hauré parlat ("I will have spoken")
- Past conditional (condicional compost), e.g. hauria parlat ("I would have spoken")
- Subjunctive preterite perfect (pretèrit perfet de subjuntiu), e.g. hagi parlat ("that I have spoken, me to have spoken")
- Subjunctive pluperfect (pretèrit plusquamperfet de subjuntiu), e.g. hagués parlat ("that I had spoken")

The perfective tense in the indicative mood has two remote-past forms, analogous to the English simple past. The more common is the periphrastic preterite (pretèrit perfet perifràstic), a compound tense formed with conjugations of a special present indicative of anar ("go", used exclusively in the formation of this tense) followed by the infinitive of the conjugated verb (vaig parlar, "I spoke"; vas parlar or vares parlar, "you [singular informal] spoke"). This special form of anar always uses the stem va- and can also use the affix -re- when the regular preterite suffix corresponding to the desired person has it. As a consequence of always using va-, vau/vàreu and vam/vàrem are used to form the periphrastic past, instead of aneu and anem. The periphrastic preterite may also be used in the subjunctive mood, but this only occurs as a literary tense and sporadically in any case; instead, the simple past subjunctive is normally used. The normative Central Catalan and Valencian forms of anar used to form this tense are outlined in the table below.

Forms of anar used to form the passat perifràstic
| | | 1st sg. | 2nd sg. | 3rd sg. | 1st pl. | 2nd pl. | 3rd pl. |
|---|---|---|---|---|---|---|---|
| Indicative | pure | vaig | vas | va | vam | vau | van |
| Indicative | reinforced | — | vares | — | vàrem | vàreu | varen |
| Subjunctive | | vagi, vaja | vagis, vages | vagi, vaja | vàgim, vàgem | vàgiu, vàgeu | vagin, vagen |

The other tense expressing the remote past is the simple preterite (pretèrit perfet simple), now used almost exclusively in writing: parlí ("I spoke"), parlares ("you (singular informal) spoke").

The imperative present (present d'imperatiu), with two forms, exists outside the imperfective–perfective contrast: one for second-person singular and the other for second-person plural (parla!, "you [singular] speak!"; parleu!, "you [plural] speak!"). For other persons, the subjunctive present is used: parli! ("let him/her speak!"), parlem! ("let us speak!"), parlin! ("let them speak!"). The imperative is used for positive commands; negative commands use the present subjunctive preceded by no: no parlis! ("don't (you) (singular informal) speak!"), no parlem! ("let us not speak!"), no parleu! ("don't (you) (plural) speak!").

The differences in meaning and usage distribution of the Catalan recent past (indefinite preterite or present perfect) and remote past (periphrastic past and synthetic preterite) are similar to those of the British English present perfect and simple past. Using the recent past implies that the action was performed sometime in the past, completed during the period of speech and its effects are still present; the remote past implies that action was performed in the past and its effects are no longer present.

In conditional clauses, verb tenses are used in these pairs:

- Subordinate clause with subjunctive perfect preterite and main clause with perfect conditional to express a condition which did not happen: si hagués arribat abans, l'hauria trobat a casa ("if I had arrived earlier, I would have met him at home")
- Subordinate clause with subjunctive imperfect preterite and main clause with simple conditional to express an unreal condition in the present or the future: si l'estimés no se n'aniria ("if he loved her, he would not leave")
- Subordinate clause with indicative present and main clause with simple future to express a possible condition in the present or the future: si fas bondat, anirem al parc ("if you behave, we will go to the park")

Other tense combinations are also possible: si heu vist el que ha passat, ens ho heu d'explicar ("if you have seen what has happened, you must tell us"). Temporary and relative subordinate clauses are formed in the future tense: quan vindràs, en parlarem ("when you will come, we will speak about it"), els qui vindran d'hora podran seure ("those arriving early will be able to sit"); though, in the contemporary language, the present subjunctive is used as well, quan vinguis ... ("when you come ..."), els qui vinguin ... ("those who come ...").

=== Non-finite ===
Catalan verbs have three non-finite forms: an infinitive, a gerund, and a past participle.

Non-finite forms of cantar ("to sing")
| | Simple | Composite |
|---|---|---|
| Infinitive | cantar | haver cantat |
| Gerund | cantant | havent cantat |
| Participle | cantat | — |

The infinitive is used with present-indicative forms of anar (to go) to form the periphrastic preterite: vaig parlar ("I spoke"). A gerund, which is unvarying, functions as an adverb; it is used to form non-finite adjunct adverbial clauses of time or manner, roughly corresponding to the present participle in English.

The past participle, a verbal adjective, may inflect for gender and number in certain constructions. It is used with the auxiliary haver ("to have") to form the perfect of the simple tenses: simple present parlo ("I speak, I'm speaking") and present perfect he parlat ("I've spoken"). In the compound perfect tenses of transitive verbs (those with a direct object), a past participle may inflect to match gender and number of the object.

In Old Catalan and some modern varieties the compound perfect tenses of intransitive verbs (those without a direct object) can also be formed with the auxiliary ser ("to be") and the past participle, inflected for gender and number of the subject: som arribats ("we have arrived", switching to masculine plural); the typical contemporary construction is hem arribat, with an invariable participle. This construction remains in only a few vestigial forms: és mort/és morta ("he's dead/she's dead").

=== Periphrastic finite ===
Infinitives can be used to make the periphrastic near future with the present of anar (to go) plus the preposition a (to): vaig a parlar ("I am going to speak"). This near future is used less often than it is in Spanish or French, because it may be confused with the Catalan periphrastic past. Infinitives can also be used to make periphrastic forms with a range of modal verbs: puc parlar ("I can speak"), he/haig de parlar ("I must/have to speak"), necessito parlar ("I need to speak"), vull parlar ("I want to speak"), solia parlar ("I used to speak"). Gerunds can be used to make periphrastic forms analogous to continuous tenses in English: estic parlant ("I'm speaking"), estava parlant ("I was speaking"), estaré parlant ("I will be speaking"). Past participles are also used with the auxiliary ser ("to be") to form the passive forms for all active tenses of transitive verbs: active present veig ("I see, I'm seeing") in relation to passive present sóc vist ("I'm seen, I'm being seen"), recent past he vist ("I've seen") in relation to passive recent past he estat vist ("I've been seen").

Catalan uses the passive voice less often than English does because it has syntactic alternatives; instead of la vaca ha estat vista ("the cow has been seen"), other constructions could be used such as changing word order and using a redundant weak pronoun to mark object case: la vaca, l'han vista ("the cow, [they] have seen it"); using the third-person reflexive weak pronoun es (s'ha vist la vaca, literally "the cow has seen itself"); using the pronoun hom, one or someone (hom ha vist la vaca, "one has seen the cow"), or using an elliptic plural subject (han vist la vaca, "they have seen the cow").

== First-conjugation (-ar) verbs ==
About 86 percent of Catalan verbs belong to this group. Examples include estimar ("to love"), esperar ("to wait" and "to hope"), menjar ("to eat") and pensar ("to think"). This is the only open verb class; new verbs incorporated into the language are likely to follow this conjugation model. The only irregular verbs in this class are the idiosyncratic anar ("to go") and estar ("to be, to stay"), which often act as auxiliary verbs.

=== parlar ("to speak") ===
| | Northern Catalan | Balearic | Central Catalan | North-Western Catalan | Valencian | Medieval Catalan |
Infinitive
| | parlar [pəɾˈɫə] | parlar [pəɾˈɫa] | parlar [pəɾˈɫa] | parlar [paɾˈɫa] | parlar [paɾˈlar] | parlar [paɾˈɫar] |
Past participle
| | parlat [pəɾˈɫat] parlada [pəɾˈɫaðə] | parlat [pəɾˈɫat] parlada [pəɾˈɫaðə] | parlat [pəɾˈɫat] parlada [pəɾˈɫaðə] | parlat [paɾˈɫat] parlada [paɾˈɫaðɛ] (Note: Occidental Catalan dialects have feminine participle ending in -[ɛ].) | parlat [paɾˈlat] parlada [paɾˈla:] (Note: Valencian drops intervocalic -d- in feminine participle.) | parlat [paɾˈɫat] parlada [paɾˈɫaða] |
Gerund
| | parlant [pəɾˈɫan] | parlant [pəɾˈɫant] | parlant [pəɾˈɫan] | parlant [paɾˈɫan] | parlant [paɾˈlant] | parlant [paɾˈɫant] |
Imperative
| tu (Note: Personal pronouns are usually not explicited, as grammatical persona and number are deducible from verb forms.) nosaltres vosaltres | parla! [ˈpaɾɫə] parlem! [pəɾˈɫɛm] parleu! [pəɾˈɫɛw] | parla! [ˈpaɾɫə] parlem! [pəɾˈɫəm] parlau! [pəɾˈɫaw] (Note: Medieval Catalan had etymological -a- in the desinence of several forms for first conjugation verbs. Only Balearic Catalan has preserved most of them. In particular: imperative second person plural, indicative present first and 2nd persons plural, and all forms of subjunctive preterite.) | parla! [ˈpaɾɫə] parlem! [pəɾˈɫɛm] parleu! [pəɾˈɫɛw] | parla! [ˈpaɾɫa] parlem! [paɾˈɫɛm] parleu! [paɾˈɫɛw] | parla! [ˈpaɾla] parlem! [paɾˈlɛm] parleu! [paɾˈlɛw] | parla! [ˈpaɾɫa] parlem! [paɾˈɫɛm] parlau! [paɾˈɫaw] |
Present indicative
| jo tu ell/ella nosaltres vosaltres ells/elles | parli [ˈpaɾɫi] (Note: Northern Catalan has -i ending in first-person singular in indicative present, indicative imperfect preterite, simple conditional, and subjunctive preterite for all conjugations. This is a notable coincidence with Gascon and Lengadocian.) parles [ˈpaɾɫəs] parla [ˈpaɾɫə] parlem [pəɾˈɫɛm] parleu [pəɾˈɫɛw] parlen [ˈpaɾɫən] | parl [ˈpaɾɫ] (Note: Medieval Catalan had no ending in the desinence of indicative present first-person singular for all conjugations, although some verbs with roots ending in complex consonantal sequences added a final support vowel -e. Balearic Catalan and Valencian have preserved this state in diverse degrees.) parles [ˈpaɾɫəs] parla [ˈpaɾɫə] parlam [pəɾˈɫam] parlau [pəɾˈɫaw] parlen [ˈpaɾɫən] | parlo [ˈpaɾɫu] parles [ˈpaɾɫəs] parla [ˈpaɾɫə] parlem [pəɾˈɫɛm] parleu [pəɾˈɫɛw] parlen [ˈpaɾɫən] | parlo [ˈpaɾɫo] parles [ˈpaɾɫes] parla [ˈpaɾɫɛ] (Note: North-Western Catalan has -[ɛ ] ending in third-person singular in present indicative, imperfect indicative, and simple conditional.) parlem [paɾˈɫɛm] parleu [paɾˈɫɛw] parlen [ˈpaɾɫen] | parle [ˈpaɾle] (Note: Valencian has -e ending in indicative present 1st person singular for 1st conjugation.) parles [ˈpaɾles] parla [ˈpaɾla] parlem [paɾˈlɛm] parleu [paɾˈlɛw] parlen [ˈpaɾlen] | parl [ˈpaɾɫ] / parle [ˈpaɾɫe] parles [ˈpaɾɫes] parla [ˈpaɾɫa] parlam [paɾˈɫam] parlau [paɾˈɫaw] parlen [ˈpaɾɫen] |
Imperfect indicative
| jo tu ell/ella nosaltres vosaltres ells/elles | parlavi [pəɾˈɫaβi] parlaves [pəɾˈɫaβəs] parlava [pəɾˈɫaβə] parlàvem [pəɾˈɫaβəm] parlàveu [pəɾˈɫaβəw] parlaven [pəɾˈɫaβən] | parlava [pəɾˈɫavə] parlaves [pəɾˈɫavəs] parlava [pəɾˈɫavə] parlàvem [pəɾˈɫavəm] parlàveu [pəɾˈɫavəw] parlaven [pəɾˈɫavən] | parlava [pəɾˈɫaβə] parlaves [pəɾˈɫaβəs] parlava [pəɾˈɫaβə] parlàvem [pəɾˈɫaβəm] parlàveu [pəɾˈɫaβəw] parlaven [pəɾˈɫaβən] | parlava [paɾˈɫaβa] parlaves [paɾˈɫaβes] parlava [paɾˈɫaβɛ] parlàvem [paɾˈɫaβem] parlàveu [paɾˈɫaβew] parlaven [paɾˈɫaβen] | parlava [paɾˈlava] parlaves [paɾˈlaves] parlava [paɾˈlava] parlàvem [paɾˈlavem] parlàveu [paɾˈlavew] parlaven [paɾˈlaven] | parlava [paɾˈɫava] parlaves [paɾˈɫaves] parlava [paɾˈɫava] parlàvem [paɾˈɫavɛm] parlàveu [paɾˈɫavɛw] parlaven [paɾˈɫaven] |
Preterite indicative (Note: In most Catalan dialects simple preterite indicative has been replaced by the so called periphrastic preterite, which is constructed with characteristic forms of anar (to go) and the infinitive of the conjugated verb.)
| jo tu ell/ella nosaltres vosaltres ells/elles | vai parlar [ˌbaj pəɾˈɫa] vas parlar [ˌbas pəɾˈɫa] va parlar [ˌba pəɾˈɫa] vem parlar [ˌbɛm pəɾˈɫa] veu parlar [ˌbɛw pəɾˈɫa] van parlar [ˌbam pəɾˈɫa] | vaig parlar [ˌvatʃ pəɾˈɫa] vas parlar [ˌvas pəɾˈɫa] va parlar [ˌva pəɾˈɫa] vam parlar [ˌvam pəɾˈɫa] vau parlar [ˌvaw pəɾˈɫa] van parlar [ˌvam pəɾˈɫa] | vaig parlar [ˌbatʃ pəɾˈɫa] vas parlar [ˌbas pəɾˈɫa] va parlar [ˌba pəɾˈɫa] vem parlar [ˌbɛm pəɾˈɫa] veu parlar [ˌbɛw pəɾˈɫa] van parlar [ˌbam pəɾˈɫa] | vai parlar [ˌbaj paɾˈɫa] vas parlar [ˌbas paɾˈɫa] va parlar [ˌba paɾˈɫa] vam parlar [ˌbam paɾˈɫa] vau parlar [ˌbaw paɾˈɫa] van parlar [ˌbam paɾˈɫa] | vaig parlar [ˌvatʃ paɾˈla] / parlí [paɾˈli] vas parlar [ˌvas paɾˈla] / parlares [paɾˈlaɾes] va parlar [ˌva paɾˈla] / parlà [paɾˈla] vam parlar [ˌvam paɾˈla] / parlàrem [paɾˈlaɾem] vau parlar [ˌvaw paɾˈla] / parlàreu [paɾˈlaɾew] van parlar [ˌvam paɾˈla] / parlaren [paɾˈlaɾen] | parlé [paɾˈɫe] / parlai [paɾˈɫaj] parlast [paɾˈɫast] parlà [paɾˈɫə] parlam [paɾˈɫam] parlàs [paɾˈɫas] parlaren [paɾˈɫaɾen] |
Future indicative
| jo tu ell/ella nosaltres vosaltres ells/elles | parlaré [pəɾɫəˈɾe] parlaràs [pəɾɫəˈɾas] parlarà [pəɾɫəˈɾa] parlarem [pəɾɫəˈɾɛm] parlareu [pəɾɫəˈɾɛw] parlaran [pəɾɫəˈɾan] | parlaré [pəɾɫəˈɾe] parlaràs [pəɾɫəˈɾas] parlarà [pəɾɫəˈɾa] parlarem [pəɾɫəˈɾəm] parlareu [pəɾɫəˈɾəw] parlaran [pəɾɫəˈɾan] | parlaré [pəɾɫəˈɾe] parlaràs [pəɾɫəˈɾas] parlarà [pəɾɫəˈɾa] parlarem [pəɾɫəˈɾɛm] parlareu [pəɾɫəˈɾɛw] parlaran [pəɾɫəˈɾan] | parlaré [paɾɫaˈɾe] parlaràs [paɾɫaˈɾas] parlarà [paɾɫaˈɾa] parlarem [paɾɫaˈɾɛm] parlareu [paɾɫaˈɾɛw] parlaran [paɾɫaˈɾan] | parlaré [paɾlaˈɾe] parlaràs [paɾlaˈɾas] parlarà [paɾlaˈɾa] parlarem [paɾlaˈɾɛm] parlareu [paɾlaˈɾɛw] parlaran [paɾlaˈɾan] | parlaré [paɾɫaˈɾe] parlaràs [paɾɫaˈɾas] parlarà [paɾɫaˈɾa] parlarem [paɾɫaˈɾɛm] parlareu [paɾɫaˈɾɛw] parlaran [paɾɫaˈɾan] |
Conditional
| jo tu ell/ella nosaltres vosaltres ells/elles | parlariï [pəɾɫəˈɾii] parlaries [pəɾɫəˈɾiəs] parlaria [pəɾɫəˈɾiə] parlaríem [pəɾɫəˈɾiəm] parlaríeu [pəɾɫəˈɾiəw] parlarien [pəɾɫəˈɾiən] | parlaria [pəɾɫəˈɾiə] parlaries [pəɾɫəˈɾiəs] parlaria [pəɾɫəˈɾiə] parlaríem [pəɾɫəˈɾiəm] parlaríeu [pəɾɫəˈɾiəw] parlarien [pəɾɫəˈɾiən] | parlaria [pəɾɫəˈɾiə] parlaries [pəɾɫəˈɾiəs] parlaria [pəɾɫəˈɾiə] parlaríem [pəɾɫəˈɾiəm] parlaríeu [pəɾɫəˈɾiəw] parlarien [pəɾɫəˈɾiən] | parlaria [paɾɫaˈɾia] parlaries [paɾɫaˈɾies] parlaria [paɾɫaˈɾiɛ] parlaríem [paɾɫaˈɾiem] parlaríeu [paɾɫaˈɾiew] parlarien [paɾɫaˈɾien] | parlaria [paɾlaˈɾia] parlaries [paɾlaˈɾies] parlaria [paɾlaˈɾia] parlaríem [paɾlaˈɾiem] parlaríeu [paɾlaˈɾiew] parlarien [paɾlaˈɾien] | parlaria [paɾɫaˈɾia] parlaries [paɾɫaˈɾies] parlaria [paɾɫaˈɾia] parlaríem [paɾɫaˈɾiɛm] parlaríeu [paɾɫaˈɾiɛw] parlarien [paɾɫaˈɾien] |
Present subjunctive
| jo tu ell/ella nosaltres vosaltres ells/elles | parli [ˈpaɾɫi] (Note: Oriental Catalan dialects have changed subjunctive present mark to -i- for 1st, 2nd, 3rd singular and third plural persons.) parlis [ˈpaɾɫis] parli [ˈpaɾɫi] parlem [pəɾˈɫɛm] parleu [pəɾˈɫɛw] parlin [ˈpaɾɫin] | parli [ˈpaɾɫi] parlis [ˈpaɾɫis] parli [ˈpaɾɫi] parlem [pəɾˈɫəm] parleu [pəɾˈɫəw] parlin [ˈpaɾɫin] | parli [ˈpaɾɫi] parlis [ˈpaɾɫis] parli [ˈpaɾɫi] parlem [pəɾˈɫɛm] parleu [pəɾˈɫɛw] parlin [ˈpaɾɫin] | parlo [ˈpaɾɫo] (Note: North-Western Catalan has subjunctive present mark to -o- for 1st,2nd, 3rd singular and 3rd plural persons.) parlos [ˈpaɾɫos] parlo [ˈpaɾɫo] parlem [pəɾˈɫɛm] parleu [pəɾˈɫɛw] parlon [ˈpaɾɫon] | parle [ˈpaɾle] (Note: Medieval Catalan had subjunctive present mark -e- in all forms for 1st conjugation, only Valencian has preserved it so.) parles [ˈpaɾles] parle [ˈpaɾle] parlem [paɾˈlɛm] parleu [paɾˈlɛw] parlen [ˈpaɾlen] | parle [ˈpaɾle] parles [ˈpaɾles] parle [ˈpaɾle] parlem [paɾˈlɛm] parleu [paɾˈlɛw] parlen [ˈpaɾlen] |
Past subjunctive
| jo tu ell/ella nosaltres vosaltres ells/elles | parlessi [pəɾˈɫesi] parlessis [pəɾˈɫesis] parlés [pəɾˈɫes] parléssim [pəɾˈɫesim] parléssiu [pəɾˈɫesiw] parlessin [pəɾˈɫesin] | parlàs [pəɾˈɫas] parlassis [pəɾˈɫasis] parlàs [pəɾˈɫas] parlàssim [pəɾˈɫasim] parlàssiu [pəɾˈɫasiw] parlassin [pəɾˈɫasin] | parlés [pəɾˈɫes] parlessis [pəɾˈɫesis] parlés [pəɾˈɫes] parléssim [pəɾˈɫesim] parléssiu [pəɾˈɫesiw] parlessin [pəɾˈɫesin] | parlessa [paɾˈɫesa] parlesses [paɾˈɫeses] parlés [paɾˈɫes] parléssom [paɾˈɫesom] parléssou [paɾˈɫesow] parlessen [paɾˈɫesen] | parlara [paɾˈlaɾa] (Note: Valencian has changed subjunctive preterite marks to -r- in all forms, by analogy with indicative preterite.) parlares [paɾˈlaɾes] parlara [paɾˈlaɾa] parlàrem [paɾˈlaɾem] parlàreu [paɾˈlaɾew] parlaren [paɾˈlaɾen] | parlàs [paɾˈɫas] parlasses [paɾˈɫases] parlàs [paɾˈɫas] parlàssem [paɾˈɫasɛw] parlàsseu [paɾˈɫasɛm] parlassen [paɾˈɫasen] |

== Second-conjugation (-re, -er) verbs ==
This is the third-largest group of verbs in Catalan, encompassing about four percent of the verbs in the dictionary. It includes most of the irregular verbs, the most-frequently-used: ser ("to be"), haver ("to have"), fer ("to do"), veure ("to see"), poder ("can"), voler ("to want"), caldre ("must"), dir ("to say") and dur ("to take/get").

In verbs whose infinitive ends in -re, the letter before -re is always a plosive (like b, d, p, t) or a diphthong consonantal u. Examples include beure ("to drink"), caure ("to fall"), coure ("to cook"), deure ("to owe", also modal "might"), fotre ("fuck"), jeure ("to lay down"), perdre ("to lose"), rebre ("to receive"), rompre ("break"), valdre ("to be worth"), vendre ("to sell"), and viure ("to live").

The final consonantal u in infinitive roots of this verb class is a characteristic Catalan evolution of several consonantal clusters from Vulgar Latin: CÁDERE > *cad're > caure, DÉBERE > *dev're > deure, VÍVERE > *viv're > viure, CÓQUERE > *cog're > coure. The clusters -ldr-, -ndr- in infinitive roots of this verb class have an epenthetic d as the result of the evolution of consonantal clusters from Vulgar Latin: VÁLERE > val're > valdre, VÉNDERE > *ven're > vendre. If the root consonant in the infinitive is b, the third-person singular indicative present will be spelt with a p; rebre becomes rep.

Some verbs in this group have a suppletive root with a velar augment (adding -g- [ɣ] or -c [k] to the basic root) in some forms, most frequently past participle, first person of indicative present, and all forms of indicative preterite, subjunctive present and subjunctive preterite: valdre gives valgut, valc, valguí, valgui, valgués; voler gives volgut, vull or vullc, volguí, vulgui, volgués.

=== batre ("to beat", "to shake") ===
| Northern Catalan | Balearic | Central Catalan | North-Western Catalan | Valencian | Medieval Catalan |
Infinitive
| batre [ˈbatɾə] | batre [ˈbatɾə] | batre [ˈbatɾə] | batre [ˈbatɾe] | batre [ˈbatɾe] | batre [ˈbatɾe] |
Past Participle
| batut [bəˈtut] batuda [bəˈtuðə] | batut [bəˈtut] batuda [bəˈtuðə] | batut [bəˈtut] batuda [bəˈtuðə] | batut [baˈtut] batuda [baˈtuðɛ] | batut [baˈtut] batuda [baˈtuɛ] | batut [baˈtut] batuda [baˈtuða] |
Gerund
| batent [bəˈten] | batent [bəˈtent] | batent [bəˈten] | batent [baˈten] | batent [baˈtent] | batent [baˈtent] |
Imperative
| bat! [ˈbat] batem! [bəˈtɛm] bateu! [bəˈtɛw] | bat! [ˈbat] batem! [bəˈtəm] bateu! [bəˈtəw] | bat! [ˈbat] batem! [bəˈtɛm] bateu! [bəˈtɛw] | bat! [ˈbat] batem! [baˈtɛm] bateu! [baˈtɛw] | bat! [ˈbat] batem! [baˈtɛm] bateu! [baˈtɛw] | bat! [ˈbat] batem! [baˈtɛm] bateu! [baˈtɛw] |
Present indicative
| bati bates bat batem bateu baten | bat bats bat batem bateu baten | bato bats bat batem bateu baten | bato bats bat batem bateu baten | bat bats bat batem bateu baten | bat bats bat batem bateu baten |
Imperfect indicative
| batiï [bəˈtii] baties [bəˈtiəs] batia [bəˈtiə] batíem [bəˈtiəm] batíeu [bəˈtiəw] batien [bəˈtiən] | batia [bəˈtiə] baties [bəˈtiəs] batia [bəˈtiə] batíem [bəˈtiəm] batíeu [bəˈtiəw] batien [bəˈtiən] | batia [bəˈtiə] baties [bəˈtiəs] batia [bəˈtiə] batíem [bəˈtiəm] batíeu [bəˈtiəw] batien [bəˈtiən] | batia [ba'tia] baties [ba'ties] batia [baˈtiɛ] batíem [ba'tiem] batíeu [ba'tiew] batien [ba'tien] | batia [ba'tia] baties [ba'ties] batia [ba'tia] batíem [ba'tiem] batíeu [ba'tiew] batien [ba'tien] | batia [ba'tia] baties [ba'ties] batia [ba'tia] batíem [ba'tiem] batíeu [ba'tiew] batien [ba'tien] |
Preterite indicative
| | | | | batí bateres baté batérem batéreu bateren | baté batest baté batem batés bateren |
Future indicative
| batiré batiràs batirà batirem batireu batiran | batiré batiràs batirà batirem batireu batiran | batiré batiràs batirà batirem batireu batiran | batiré batiràs batirà batirem batireu batiran | batiré batiràs batirà batirem batireu batiran | batiré batiràs batirà batirem batireu batiran |
Conditional
| batiriï batiries batiria batiríem batiríeu batirien | batiria batiries batiria batiríem batiríeu batirien | batiria batiries batiria batiríem batiríeu batirien | batiria batiries batiria batiríem batiríeu batirien | batiria batiries batiria batiríem batiríeu batirien | batiria batiries batiria batiríem batiríeu batirien |
Present subjunctive
| bati batis bati batem bateu batin | bata bates bata batem bateu baten | bati batis bati batem bateu batin | bato batos bato batem bateu baton | bata bates bata batem bateu baten | bata bates bata batem bateu baten |
Past subjunctive
| batessi batessis batés batéssim batéssiu batessin | batés batessis batés batéssim batéssiu batessin | batés batessis batés batéssim batéssiu batessin | batés batesses batés batéssem batésseu batessen | batera bateres batera batérem batéreu bateren | batés batesses batés batéssem batésseu batessen |

== Third-conjugation (-ir) verbs ==
This is the second-largest group of regular verbs in the Catalan language (about 10 percent of verbs in the dictionary). Most regular verbs in the group (about 91 percent) are inchoative, deriving from the Latin inchoative suffix -ESC-. The varied suffixes (eix-, -ix-, -esc-, -isc- [ˈɛʃ, ˈiʃ, ˈɛsk, ˈisk]), depending on tense and dialect, which carry the stress, is added to the root in the imperative second-person singular and the first-, second- and third-person singular and third-person plural of the indicative and subjunctive present: servir gives the imperative second-person singular serveix!, third-person singular indicative present serveix and the third-person singular subjunctive present serveixi.

=== Two-stemmed inchoatives: servir ("to serve") ===
These verbs have basic (serv-) and extended stems (serveix-, servix-, servesc- or servisc-), used in particular tenses. Examples of inchoative verbs include patir ("to suffer/endure") and partir ("to divide"), which give the third-person singular indicative present of pateix and parteix respectively.

| Northern Catalan | Balearic | Central Catalan | North-Western Catalan | Valencian | Medieval Catalan |
Infinitive
| servir [səɾˈβi] | servir [səɾˈvi] | servir [səɾˈβi] | servir [seɾˈβi] | servir [seɾˈviɾ] | servir [seɾˈviɾ] |
Past Participle
| servit [səɾˈβit] servida [səɾˈβiðə] | servit [səɾˈvit] servida [səɾˈviðə] | servit [səɾˈβit] servida [səɾˈβiðə] | servit [seɾˈβit] servida [seɾˈβiðɛ] | servit [seɾˈvit] servida [seɾˈviɛ] | servit [seɾˈvit] servida [seɾˈviða] |
Gerund
| servint [səɾˈβin] | servint [səɾˈvint] | servint [səɾˈβin] | servint [seɾˈβin] | servint [seɾˈvint] | servint [seɾˈvint] |
Imperative
| serveix! [səɾˈβɛʃ] servim! [səɾˈβim] serviu! [səɾˈβiw] | serveix! [səɾˈvɛʃ] serviguem! [səɾviˈɣəm] serviu! [səɾˈviw] | serveix! [səɾˈβɛʃ] servim! [səɾˈβim] serviu! [səɾˈβiw] | servix! [seɾˈβiʃ] servim! [seɾˈβim] serviu! [seɾˈβiw] | servix! [seɾˈviʃ] servim! [seɾˈvim] serviu! [seɾˈviw] | serveix! [seɾˈvɛʃ] servim! [seɾˈvim] serviu! [seɾˈviw] |
Present indicative
| serveixi [səɾˈβɛʃi] serveixes [səɾˈβɛʃəs] serveix [səɾˈβɛʃ] servim [səɾˈβim] serviu [səɾˈβiw] serveixen [səɾˈβɛʃən] | servesc [səɾˈvɛsk] serveixes [səɾˈvɛʃəs] serveix [səɾˈvɛʃ] servim [səɾˈvim] serviu [səɾˈviw] serveixen [səɾˈvɛʃən] | serveixo [səɾˈβɛʃu] serveixes [səɾˈβɛʃəs] serveix [səɾˈβɛʃ] servim [səɾˈβim] serviu [səɾˈβiw] serveixen [səɾˈβɛʃən] | servixo [seɾˈβiʃo] servixes [seɾˈβiʃes] servix [seɾˈβiʃ] servim [seɾˈβim] serviu [seɾˈβiw] servixen [seɾˈβiʃen] | servixc [seɾˈviʃk] / servisc [seɾˈvisk] servixes [seɾˈviʃes] servix [seɾˈviʃ] servim [seɾˈvim] serviu [seɾˈviw] servixen [seɾˈviʃen] | servesc [seɾˈvɛsk] serveixes [seɾˈvɛʃes] serveix [seɾˈvɛʃ] servim [seɾˈvim] serviu [seɾˈviw] serveixen [seɾˈvɛʃen] |
Imperfect indicative
| serviï [səɾˈβii] servies [səɾˈβiəs] servia [səɾˈβiə] servíem [səɾˈβiəm] servíeu [səɾˈβiəw] servien [səɾˈβiən] | servia [səɾˈviə] servies [səɾˈviəs] servia [səɾˈviə] servíem [səɾˈviəm] servíeu [səɾˈviəw] servien [səɾˈviən] | servia [səɾˈβiə] servies [səɾˈβiəs] servia [səɾˈβiə] servíem [səɾˈβiəm] servíeu [səɾˈβiəw] servien [səɾˈβiən] | servia [seɾˈβia] servies [seɾˈβies] servia [seɾˈβiɛ] servíem [seɾˈβiem] servíeu [seɾˈβiew] servien [seɾˈβien] | servia [seɾˈvia] servies [seɾˈvies] servia [seɾˈvia] servíem [seɾˈviem] servíeu [seɾˈview] servien [seɾˈvien] | servia [seɾˈvia] servies [seɾˈvies] servia [seɾˈvia] servíem [seɾˈviem] servíeu [seɾˈview] servien [seɾˈvien] |
Preterite indicative
| | | | | serví servires serví servírem servíreu serviren | serví servist serví servim servís serviren |
Future indicative
| serviré serviràs servirà servirem servireu serviran | serviré serviràs servirà servirem servireu serviran | serviré serviràs servirà servirem servireu serviran | serviré serviràs servirà servirem servireu serviran | serviré serviràs servirà servirem servireu serviran | serviré serviràs servirà servirem servireu serviran |
Conditional
| serviriï serviries serviria serviríem serviríeu servirien | serviria serviries serviria serviríem serviríeu servirien | serviria serviries serviria serviríem serviríeu servirien | serviria serviries serviria serviríem serviríeu servirien | serviria serviries serviria serviríem serviríeu servirien | serviria serviries serviria serviríem serviríeu servirien |
Present subjunctive
| serveixi serveixis serveixi servim serviu serveixin | servesqui servesquis servesqui serviguem servigueu servesquin | serveixi serveixis serveixi servim serviu serveixin | servixo servixos servixo servim serviu servixon | servixca/servisca servixques/servisques servixca/servisca servim serviu servixquen/servisquen | servesca servesques servesca servim serviu servesquen |
Past subjunctive
| servissi servissis servís servíssim servíssiu servissin | servís servissis servís servíssim servíssiu servissin | servís servissis servís servíssim servíssiu servissin | servís servissis servís servíssim servíssiu servissin | servira servires servira servírem servíreu serviren | servís servisses servís servíssem servísseu servissen |

=== One-stemmed: dormir ("to sleep") ===
Examples of non-inchoative verbs include fugir ("to flee") and morir ("to die"), which give third-person singular indicative presents of fuig and mor respectively.

| Northern Catalan | Balearic | Central Catalan | North-Western Catalan | Valencian | Medieval Catalan |
Infinitive
| dormir [duɾˈmi] | dormir [duɾˈmi] | dormir [duɾˈmi] | dormir [doɾˈmi] | dormir [doɾˈmir] | dormir [doɾˈmir] |
Past Participle
| dormit [duɾˈmit] dormida [duɾˈmiðə] | dormit [duɾˈmit] dormida [duɾˈmiðə] | dormit [duɾˈmit] dormida [duɾˈmiðə] | dormit [doɾˈmit] dormida [doɾˈmiðɛ] | dormit [doɾˈmit] dormida [doɾˈmiɛ] | dormit [doɾˈmit] dormida [doɾˈmiða] |
Gerund
| dormint [duɾˈmin] | dormint [duɾˈmint] | dormint [duɾˈmin] | dormint [doɾˈmin] | dormint [doɾˈmint] | dormint [doɾˈmint] |
Imperative
| dorm! dormim! dormiu! | dorm! dormiguem! dormiu! | dorm! dormim! dormiu! | dorm! dormim! dormiu! | dorm! dormim! dormiu! | dorm! dormim! dormiu! |
Present indicative
| dormi [ˈdɔɾmi] dormes dorm dormim dormiu dormen | dorm [ˈdɔɾm] dorms dorm dormim dormiu dormen | dormo [ˈdɔɾmu] dorms dorm dormim dormiu dormen | dormo [ˈdɔɾmo] dorms dorm dormim dormiu dormen | dorm [ˈdɔɾm] dorms dorm dormim dormiu dormen | dorm [ˈdɔɾm] dorms dorm dormim dormiu dormen |
Imperfect indicative
| dormiï [durˈmii] dormies dormia dormíem dormíeu dormien | dormia [doɾˈmiə] dormies dormia dormíem dormíeu dormien | dormia [duɾˈmiə] dormies dormia dormíem dormíeu dormien | dormia [doɾˈmia] dormies dormia [dorˈmiɛ] dormíem dormíeu dormien | dormia [doɾˈmia] dormies dormia dormíem dormíeu dormien | dormia [doɾˈmia] dormies dormia dormíem dormíeu dormien |
Preterite indicative
| | | | | dormí dormires dormí dormírem dormíreu dormiren | dormí dormist dormí dormim dormís dormiren |
Future indicative
| dormiré dormiràs dormirà dormirem dormireu dormiran | dormiré dormiràs dormirà dormirem dormireu dormiran | dormiré dormiràs dormirà dormirem dormireu dormiran | dormiré dormiràs dormirà dormirem dormireu dormiran | dormiré dormiràs dormirà dormirem dormireu dormiran | dormiré dormiràs dormirà dormirem dormireu dormiran |
Conditional
| dormiriï dormiries dormiria dormiríem dormiríeu dormirien | dormiria dormiries dormiria dormiríem dormiríeu dormirien | dormiria dormiries dormiria dormiríem dormiríeu dormirien | dormiria dormiries dormiria dormiríem dormiríeu dormirien | dormiria dormiries dormiria dormiríem dormiríeu dormirien | dormiria dormiries dormiria dormiríem dormiríeu dormirien |
Present subjunctive
| dormi dormis dormi dormim dormiu dormin | dormi dormis dormi dormiguem dormigueu dormin | dormi dormis dormi dormim dormiu dormin | dormo dormos dormo dormim dormiu dormon | dorma dormes dorma dormim dormiu dormen | dorma dormes dorma dormim dormiu dormen |
Past subjunctive
| dormissi dormissis dormís dormíssim dormíssiu dormissin | dormís dormissis dormís dormíssim dormíssiu dormissin | dormís dormissis dormís dormíssim dormíssiu dormissin | dormís dormisses dormís dormíssem dormísseu dormissen | dormira dormires dormira dormírem dormíreu dormiren | dormís dormisses dormís dormíssem dormísseu dormissen |

== Irregular verbs ==
=== ser or ésser ("to be") ===
This auxiliary verb presents several different roots: s-, ess-, er-, sig- (from Latin ESSE), and for-, foss, fu- (from Latin perfect forms of ESSE, which had analogous suppletive roots).

| Northern Catalan | Balearic | Central Catalan | North-Western Catalan | Valencian | Medieval Catalan |
Infinitive
| ser [ˈsɛ] | ser [ˈsə] / esser [əˈse] | ser [ˈse] / ésser [ˈesə] | ser [ˈse] | ser [ˈseɾ] | ésser [ˈeseɾ] |
Past Participle
| sigut siguda | | sigut/set/estat siguda/seta/estada | sigut/set siguda/seta | segut seguda | |
Gerund
| siguent | | sent/siguent/essent | sent/siguent | sent/siguent | |
Imperative
| | | sigues siguem sigueu | | | |
Present indicative
| sun es/ets és sem seu sun | som ets és som sou són | sóc/so ets és som sou són | | | |
Imperfect indicative
| eri eres/érets era érem éreu eren | | era eres era érem éreu eren | | | |
Preterite indicative
| | | | | fui fores fou fórem fóreu foren | fui fuist/fost fo/fou/fonc fom/fórem fos/fórets foren |
Future indicative
| seré [səˈɾe] seràs [səˈɾas] serà [səˈɾa] serem [səˈɾɛm] sereu [səˈɾɛw] seran [səˈɾan] | seré [səˈɾe] seràs [səˈɾas] serà [səˈɾa] serem [səˈɾɛm] sereu [səˈɾɛw] seran [səˈɾan] | seré [səˈɾe] seràs [səˈɾas] serà [səˈɾa] serem [səˈɾɛm] sereu [səˈɾɛw] seran [səˈɾan] | siré [siˈɾe] siràs [siˈɾas] sirà [siˈɾa] sirem [siˈɾɛm] sireu [siˈɾɛw] siran [siˈɾan] | seré [seˈɾe] seràs [seˈɾas] serà [seˈɾa] serem [seˈɾɛm] sereu [seˈɾɛw] seran [seˈɾan] | seré [seˈɾe] seràs [seˈɾas] serà [seˈɾa] serem [seˈɾɛm] sereu [seˈɾɛw] seran [seˈɾan] |
Conditional
| seriï series seria seríem seríeu serien | seria series seria seríem seríeu serien | seria/fóra series/fores seria/fóra seríem/fórem seríeu/fóreu serien/foren | siria siries siria siríem siríeu sirien | seria series seria seríem seríeu serien | fóra fores fóra fórem fóreu foren |
Present subjunctive
| sigui siguis sigui siguem sigueu siguin | sigui siguis sigui siguem sigueu siguin | sigui siguis sigui siguem sigueu siguin | sigo sigos sigo siguem sigueu sigon | siga sigues sigue siguem sigueu siguen | |
Past subjunctive
| siguessi siguessis sigués siguéssim siguéssiu siguessin | sigués siguessis sigués siguéssim siguéssiu siguessin | fos/sigués fossis/siguessis fos/sigués fóssim/siguéssim fóssiu/siguéssiu fossin/siguessin | fos fosses fos fóssem fósseu fossen | fóra fores fóra fórem fóreu foren | |

=== haver ("to have") ===
This auxiliary verb has several different roots: h-, hav- and hag- (either [aɣ] or [aʒ]) (all from Latin HABERE). There are more dialectal forms with a velar augment based on the root hag-.

| Central Catalan | Northwestern Catalan | Valencian |
Infinitive
| haver | | |
Past participle
| hagut haguda | | |
Gerund
| havent | | |
Present indicative
| he/haig has ha hem heu han | | |
Imperfect indicative
| havia havies havia havíem havíeu havien | | |
Future indicative
| hauré hauràs haurà haurem haureu hauran | | |
Conditional
| hauria hauries hauria hauríem hauríeu haurien | | |
Present subjunctive
| hagi hagis hagi hàgim hàgiu hagin | haja hages haja hàgem hàgeu hagen | haja hages haja hàgem hàgeu hagen |
Past subjunctive
| hagués haguessis hagués haguéssim haguéssiu haguessin | hagués haguesses hagués haguéssem haguésseu haguessen | haguera hagueres haguera haguérem haguéreu hagueren |

=== anar ("to go") ===
Anar has two roots: ana-, ani- (from Latin AMBULARE, the second a mix with Latin IRE) and va-, vag- [baʒ] (from Latin VADERE). The present of anar is used as an auxiliary verb to form the periphrastic preterite with the infinitive of the verb being conjugated. The forms of anar as an auxiliary verb are slightly different from the normal present tense. The first- and second-person plural forms are different; the auxiliary verb forms are vam and vau (or vem and veu, depending on dialect), and the full verb forms are anem and aneu (or anam and anau, depending on dialect).

| Northern Catalan | Balearic | Central Catalan | North-Western Catalan | Valencian | Medieval Catalan |
Infinitive
| anar | anar | anar | anar | anar | anar |
Past Participle
| anat anada | anat anada | anat anada | anat anada | anat anada | anat anada |
Gerund
| anant | anant | anant | anant | anant | anant |
Imperative
| vés! [ˈbes] anem! [əˈnɛm] aneu! [əˈnɛw] | vés! [ˈves] anem! [əˈnəm] anau! [əˈnɛw] | vés! [ˈbes] anem! [əˈnɛm] aneu! [əˈnɛw] | vés! [ˈbes] anem! [aˈnɛm] aneu! [aˈnɛw] | vés! [ˈves] anem! [aˈnɛm] aneu! [aˈnɛw] | |
Present indicative
| vaig [ˈbatʃ] vas ['bas] va [ˈba] anem [əˈnɛm] aneu [əˈnɛw] van [ˈban] | vaig [ˈvatʃ] vas ['vas] va [ˈva] anam [əˈnam] anau [əˈnaw] van [ˈvan] | vaig [ˈbatʃ] vas ['bas] va [ˈba] anem [əˈnɛm] aneu [əˈnɛw] van [ˈban] | vaig [ˈbatʃ] vas ['bas] va [ˈba] anem [aˈnɛm] aneu [aˈnɛw] van [ˈban] | vaig [ˈvatʃ] vas ['vas] va [ˈva] anem [aˈnɛm] aneu [aˈnɛw] van [ˈvan] | vaig [ˈvatʃ] vas ['vas] va [ˈva] anam [aˈnɛm] anau [aˈnɛw] van [ˈvan] |
Imperfect indicative
| anava anaves anava anàvem anàveu anaven | anava anaves anava anàvem anàveu anaven | anava anaves anava anàvem anàveu anaven | anava anaves anava anàvem anàveu anaven | anava anaves anava anàvem anàveu anaven | anava anaves anava anàvem anàveu anaven |
Preterite indicative
| | | | | aní anares anà anàrem anàreu anaren | ané/aní anàs/anist anà anam anats anaren |
Future indicative
| iré iràs irà irem ireu iran | aniré aniràs anirà anirem anireu aniran | aniré aniràs anirà anirem anireu aniran | aniré aniràs anirà anirem anireu aniran | aniré aniràs anirà anirem anireu aniran | |
Conditional
| iria iries iria iríem iríeu irien | aniria aniries aniria aniríem aniríeu anirien | aniria aniries aniria aniríem aniríeu anirien | aniria aniries aniria aniríem aniríeu anirien | aniria aniries aniria aniríem aniríeu anirien | |
Present subjunctive
| vagi vagis vagi anem aneu vagin | vagi vagis vagi anem aneu vagin | vagi vagis vagi anem aneu vagin | vaja vages vaja anem aneu vagen | vaja vages vaja anem aneu vagen | vaja vages vaja anem aneu vagen |
Past subjunctive
| anéssi anessis anés anéssim anéssiu anessin | anàs anassis anàs anàssim anàssiu anassin | anés anessis anés anéssim anéssiu anessin | anés anessis anés anéssim anéssiu anessin | anara anares anara anàrem anàreu anaren | |

=== fer ("to do") ===
This irregular verb presents several different roots: fe-, fa-, fac- [fas] (from the Latin FACERE). There are more dialectal (and non-standard) forms based on the root fag- [faʒ], similar to haver (for example, in the central Catalan subjunctive present).

| Balearic | Central Catalan | North-Western Catalan | Valencian | Medieval Catalan |
Infinitive
| | fer | | | |
Past participle
| | fet feta | | | |
Gerund
| | fent | | | |
Imperative
| fé facem! feis! | fes fem! feu! | fes fem! feu! | fes fem! feu! | fes fem! feu! |
Present indicative
| faç fas fa faim fais fan | faig fas fa fem feu fan | | faig fas fa fem feu fan | |
Imperfect indicative
| | feia feies feia feiem feieu feien | | | |
Preterite indicative
| | | | fiu feres féu férem féreu feren | fiu faist/fist féu faem faés/fés feren |
Future indicative
| | faré faràs farà farem fareu faran | | | |
Conditional
| | faria faries faria faríem faríeu farien | | | |
Present subjunctive
| faci facis faci facem faceu facin | faci facis faci fem feu facin | | faça faces faça fem feu facen | |
Past subjunctive
| | fes fessis fes féssim féssiu fessin | fes fesses fes féssem fésseu fessen | fera feres fera férem féreu feren | |

=== dir ("to say") ===
This irregular verb presents several different roots: di-, diu- [diw], dei- [dɛj], dig- [diɣ], dic- [dik] (all from Latin DICERE). There are more dialectal forms with a velar augment based on the root dig-, especially in the Balearic dialects.

| Northern Catalan | Balearic | Central Catalan | North-Western Catalan | Valencian | Medieval Catalan |
Infinitive
| dir [ˈdi] | dir [ˈdi] | dir [ˈdi] | dir [ˈdi] | dir [ˈdir] | dir [ˈdir] |
Past Participle
| | | dit dita | | | |
Gerund
| | | dient | | | |
Imperative
| | digues! diguem! digau! | digues! diguem! digueu! | | | |
Present indicative
| | dic dius diu deim deis diuen | dic dius diu diem dieu diuen | | | |
Imperfect indicative
| | | deia deies deia dèiem dèieu deien | | | |
Preterite indicative
| | | | | diguí digueres digué diguérem diguéreu digueren | dix dixist dix dixem dixest dixeren |
Future indicative
| | | diré diràs dirà direm direu diran | | | |
Conditional
| | | diria diries diria diríem diríeu dirien | | | |
Present subjunctive
| | | digui [ˈdiɣi] diguis [ˈdiɣis] digui [ˈdiɣi] diguem [diˈɣɛm] digueu [diˈɣɛw] diguin [ˈdiɣin] | | | |
Past subjunctive
| | | digués diguessis digués diguéssim diguéssiu diguessin | | | |

=== dur ("to take/get") ===
This irregular verb has several different roots: du-, dui- [duj], dug- [duɣ], duc- [duk] (all from Latin DUCERE). There are more dialectal forms with a velar augment based on the root dug-, especially in the Balearic dialects.

| Northern Catalan | Balearic | Central Catalan | North-Western Catalan | Valencian | Medieval Catalan |
Infinitive
| dur [ˈdu] | dur [ˈdu] | dur [ˈdu] | dur [ˈdu] | dur [ˈdur] | dur [ˈdur] |
Past Participle
| | duit [ˈdujt] duita [ˈdujtə] | dut [ˈdut] duta [ˈdutə] | | | |
Gerund
| | | duent | | | |
Imperative
| | duu! duguem! duis! | duu! duguem! dueu! | | dus! duguem! dueu! | dus! duguem! dueu! |
Present indicative
| | duc [ˈduk] duus [ˈduws] / dus [ˈdus] duu [ˈduw] / du [ˈdu] duim [ˈdujm] duis [ˈdujs] duen [ˈduən] | duc [ˈduk] duus [ˈduws] / dus [ˈdus] duu [ˈduw] / du [ˈdu] duem [duˈɛm] dueu [duˈɛw] duen [ˈduən] | | duc [ˈduk] duus [ˈduws] / dus [ˈdus] duu [ˈduw] / du [ˈdu] duem [duˈɛm] dueu [duˈɛw] duen [ˈduen] | |
Imperfect indicative
| | | duia duies duia duiem duieu duien | | | |
Preterite indicative
| | | | | duguí dugueres dugué duguérem duguéreu dugueren | dux duxist dux duxem duxest duxeren |
Future indicative
| | | duré duràs durà durem dureu duran | | | |
Conditional
| | | duria duries duria duríem duríeu durien | | | |
Present subjunctive
| | | dugui [ˈduɣi] duguis [ˈduɣis] dugui [ˈduɣi] duguem [duˈɣɛm] dugueu [duˈɣɛw] duguin [ˈduɣin] | | | |
Past subjunctive
| | | dugués duguessis dugués duguéssim duguéssiu duguessin | | | |

== Online Catalan verb conjugators ==
- Catalan Conjugator. CatalanDictionary.org
- Romance languages: Catalan - verbix.com
- Catalan verb conjugations and exercises - verbs.cat

== See also ==
- Catalan phonology
- Romance verbs
- Occitan conjugation

== Bibliography ==
- Proposta per a un estandàrd oral de la llengua catalana, II – Morfologia / Institut d'Estudis Catalans. Secció filològica – 1999
- Gramática histórica catalana / Antoni Maria Badia i Margarit – Tres i quatre, 1994
- Moments clau de la història de la llengua catalana / Antoni Maria Badia i Margarit – Universitat de València, 2004
- Gramàtica històrica catalana / Francesc de Borja i Moll – Universitat de València, 2006
- Morfologia catalana / Manuel Pérez Saldanya (coord.) – UOC, 2001
- Els Parlars catalans : síntesi de dialectologia / Joan Veny i Clar – Moll, 1982
- Els verbs catalans conjugats / Joan Baptista Xuriguera i Parramona – Claret, 1972
