= Romance verbs =

Verbs in the Romance family of languages

Romance verbs are the most inflected part of speech in the language family. In the transition from Latin to the Romance languages, verbs went through many phonological, syntactic, and semantic changes. Most of the distinctions present in classical Latin continued to be made, but synthetic forms were often replaced with more analytic ones. Other verb forms changed meaning, and new forms also appeared.

== Overview ==
The following table presents a comparison of the conjugation of the regular verb cantare "to sing" in Classical Latin, and Vulgar Latin (reconstructed as Proto-Italo-Western Romance, with stress marked), and diverse languages derived from Latin. The conjugations below were given from their respective Wiktionary pages.

Comparison of the verb "to sing" in diverse languages derived from Latin
| Form | | Classical Latin | Vulgar Latin | Ibero-Romance | | | | | Occitano-Romance | | | Gallo-Romance | | | Italo-Dalmatian | | | | Eastern-Romance | Sardinian | Rhaeto-Romance | | | Gallo-Italic | | | | Planned Languages | | |
| Form | | Classical Latin | Vulgar Latin | Portuguese | Galician | Asturian (Central) | Spanish | Judezmo | Aragonese | Catalan | Occitan (Lengadocian) | Arpitan (ORB Supradialectal Orthography) | French (written) (Note: Because of the phonetic erosion of verb endings, French has become a non-pro-drop language: each sentence always contains an explicit subject. The subjunctive is also always accompanied with the particle que.) | French (spoken) | Italian | Sicilian | Neapolitan | Barese (Murgia) | Romanian | Sardinian (Logudorese) | Romansh (Grischun) | Friulian | Ladin | Emilian (Frignano) (Note: Clitic subjects have been retained as they are essential for verb conjugation.) | Romagnol (Sammarinese) | Ligurian | Piedmontese | Occidental | Interlingua | Neolatino |
|---|---|---|---|---|---|---|---|---|---|---|---|---|---|---|---|---|---|---|---|---|---|---|---|---|---|---|---|---|---|---|
| Infinitive | | cantāre | *cantáre | cantar | cantar | cantar | cantar | kantar | cantar | cantar | cantar | chantar | chanter | /ʃɑ̃te/ | cantare | cantari | cantà | cande(j) | cânta | cantare | chantar | cjantâ | cianter | cantèr | cantè | cantâ | canté | cantar | cantar | cantare |
| Present participle (Note: Both cantandus and cantāns change to their accusative forms cantandum and cantmāntem.) | | cantandus | *cantándu | cantando | cantando | cantando | cantando | kantando | cantando | cantant | cantant | chantent | chantant | /ʃɑ̃tɑ̃/ | cantando (Note: Functions as gerund in Italian.) | cantannu | cantanno | candann | cântând | – | chantond | cjantant | ciant | cantànd | cantànd | cantando | cantand | cantante | cantante | cantando |
| Present participle | | cantāns | *cantánte | cantante | cantante | cantante | cantante | - | cantant | – | – | – | – | – | cantante | – | – | candand | cantende | – | – | – | – | cantant | cantante (Note: Disused.) | cantant | cantant | – | cantante | – |
| Past participle | | cantātum | *cantátu | cantado | cantado | cantáu, cantao | cantado | kantado | cantato, cantau | cantat | cantat | chantâ | chanté | /ʃɑ̃te/ | cantato | cantatu | cantato | candoit | cântat | cantadu | chantà | cjantât | cianté | cantê/cantà | cantèd/cantèda/cantèdi (Note: plural) | cantou | cantà | cantat | cantate | cantato |
| Indicative | Present | cantō cantās cantat cantāmus cantātis cantant | *cánto *cántas *cántat *cantámos *cantátes *cántant | canto cantas canta cantamos cantais cantam | canto cantas canta cantamos cantades cantan | canto cantes canta cantamos cantáis canten | canto cantas canta cantamos cantáis cantan | kanto kantas kanta kantamos kantáx kantan | canto cantas canta cantam(os) cantaz cantan | canto cantes canta cantem canteu canten | canti cantas canta cantam cantatz cantan | chanto chantes chante chantens chantâds chantont | chante chantes chante chantons chantez chantent | /ʃɑ̃t/ /ʃɑ̃t/ /ʃɑ̃t/ /ʃɑ̃tɔ̃/ /ʃɑ̃te/ /ʃɑ̃t/ | canto canti canta cantiamo cantate cantano | cantu canti canta cantamu cantati càntanu | canto cante canta cantammo cantate cantano | candc cand cand candoim candoit candǝn | cânt cânți cântă cântăm cântați cântă | canto cantas cantat cantamus cantades cantant | chant chantas chanta chantain chantais chantan | cjanti cjantis cjante cjantìn cjantais cjantin | ciante ciantes cianta cianton cianteis cianta | a cant t' cant al/la canta a cantámm a cantê i/al canten | a chent t chent e/la chenta a cantém a cantéd i/al chenta | canto ti canti o/a canta cantemmo cantæ cantan | canto cante canta cantuma cante canto | canta | canta | canto cantas canta cantamos cantates cantan |
| Indicative | Imperfect | cantābam cantābās cantābat cantābāmus cantābātis cantābant | *cantába *cantábas *cantábat *cantábamos *cantábates *cantábant | cantava cantavas cantava cantávamos cantáveis cantavam | cantaba cantabas cantaba cantabamos cantabades cantaban | cantaba cantabes cantaba cantábemos cantábeis cantaben | cantaba cantabas cantaba cantábamos cantabais cantaban | kantava kantavas kantava kantávamos kantavax kantavan | cantaba cantabas cantaba cantaban(os) cantábaz cantaban | cantava cantaves cantava cantàvem cantàveu cantaven | cantavi cantavas cantava cantàvem cantàvetz cantavan | chantâvo chantâves chantâve chantâvens chantâvads chantâvont | chantais chantais chantait chantions chantiez chantaient | /ʃɑ̃tɛ/ /ʃɑ̃tɛ/ /ʃɑ̃tɛ/ /ʃɑ̃tjɔ̃/ /ʃɑ̃tje/ /ʃɑ̃tɛ/ | cantavo cantavi cantava cantavamo cantavate cantavano | cantavu cantavi cantava cantàvamu cantàvavu cantàvanu | cantavo cantave cantava cantàvemo cantàveve cantàvano | candaj candiǝv candaj candajm candiǝv candajn | cântam cântai cânta cântam cântați cântau | cantaia cantaias cantaiat cantaiamus cantaiades cantaiant | chantava chantavas chantava chantavan chantavas chantavan | cjantavi cjantavis cjantave cjantavin cjantavis cjantavin | ciantove ciantoves ciantova ciantovan ciantovais ciantova | a cantèva t' cantèv al/la cantèva a cantèven a cantèvi i/al canteven | a canteva t cantevi e/la canteva a cantimi a cantivi i/al canteva | cantava ti cantavi o/a cantava cantavimo cantavi cantavan | cantava cantave cantava cantavo cantave cantavo | cantat | cantava | cantava/cantavo cantavas cantava cantavamos cantavates cantavan |
| Indicative | Preterite | cantāvī cantāvistī cantāvit cantāvimus cantāvistis cantāvērunt | *cantái *cantásti *cantáut *cantámos *cantástes *cantáront | cantei cantaste cantou cantámos cantastes cantaram | cantei cantaches cantou cantamos cantastes cantaron | canté cantesti cantó cantemos cantestis cantaron | canté cantaste cantó cantamos cantasteis cantaron | kantí kantates kantó kantimos kantatex kantaron | canté cantés cantó cantem(os) cantez cantoron | cantí / vaig cantar cantares / vas cantar cantà / va cantar cantàrem / vàrem cantar cantàreu / vàreu cantar cantaren / van cantar | cantèri cantères cantèt cantèrem cantèretz cantèron | chantéro/chanté chantéres/chantés chantét chantérens chantérades/chantétes chantéront | chantai chantas chanta chantâmes chantâtes chantèrent (Note: Literary.) | /ʃɑ̃te/ /ʃɑ̃ta/ /ʃɑ̃ta/ /ʃɑ̃tam/ /ʃɑ̃tat/ /ʃɑ̃tɛʁ/ | cantai cantasti cantò cantammo cantaste cantarono | cantai cantasti cantau cantammu cantastivu cantàrunu | cantaie cantaste cantaie cantàiemo cantàsteve cantàreno | candabb candast candò candamm candast candorǝn | cântai cântași cântă cântarăm cântarăți cântară | cantesi cantesti cantesit cantemus cantezis canteint | – | cjantai cjantaris cjantà cjantarin cjantaris cjantarin | – | a canté t' cantéss al/la cantò a cantén a cantéssi i / al cantén | a cantò t cantassi e/la cantò a cantasme a cantassi i / al cantò | – | – | cantat | cantava | cantai cantaste cantau cantammos cantastes cantaron |
| Indicative | Pluperfect | cantāveram cantāveras cantāverat cantāverāmus cantāverātis cantāverant | *cantára *cantáras *cantárat *cantáramos *cantárates *cantárant | cantara cantaras cantara cantáramos cantáreis cantaram (Note: Fell into disuse in modern Portuguese, now found only in literary texts. Nowadays largely replaced by the compound forms tinha cantado or havia cantado (had sung).) | cantara cantaras cantara cantaramos cantarades cantaran | cantara cantares cantara cantáramos cantarais cantaren | cantara cantaras cantara cantáramos cantarais cantaran (Note: Its meaning has mostly shifted to that of an imperfect subjunctive in modern Spanish. It is now usually interchangeable with cantase, cantases, cantase, etc. Nevertheless, a few rare uses as a pluperfect subsist.) | kantara kantaras kantara kantáramos kantarax kantaran | – | – | – | – | – | – | – | cantirìa cantirissi cantirìa cantirìamu cantirìavu cantirìanu (Note: Its meaning has shifted to that of a conditional in Sicilian.) | – | – | – | – | – | – | – | – | – | – | – | – | – | |
| Indicative | Future (Note: The future indicative tense of the modern languages does not derive from the Latin form (which tended to be confounded with the imperfect due to sound changes in Vulgar Latin), but rather from an infinitive + habeō periphrasis (*cantāre habeō > *cantaráio > Sp. cantaré), later reanalysed as a simple tense. By analogy a conditional or future-in-the-past tense was formed from the imperfect or preterite of habeō (*cantāre habēbam > *cantaraía > Sp. cantaría).) | cantābō cantābis cantābit cantābimus cantābitis cantābunt | – | cantarei cantarás cantará cantaremos cantareis cantarão | cantarei cantarás cantará cantaremos cantaredes cantarán | cantaré cantarás cantará cantaremos cantaréis cantarán | cantaré cantarás cantará cantaremos cantaréis cantarán | kantaré kantarás kantará kantaremos kantaréx kantarán | cantaré cantarás cantará cantarem(os) cantarez cantarán | cantaré cantaràs cantarà cantarem cantareu cantaran | cantarai cantaràs cantarà cantarem cantaretz cantaràn | chanteré chanterés chanterat chanterens chanteréds chanteront | chanterai chanteras chantera chanterons chanterez chanteront | /ʃɑ̃tʁe/ /ʃɑ̃tʁa/ /ʃɑ̃tʁa/ /ʃɑ̃tʁɔ̃/ /ʃɑ̃tʁe/ /ʃɑ̃tʁɔ̃/ | canterò canterai canterà canteremo canterete canteranno | cantirroggiu cantirrai cantirrà cantirremu cantirriti cantirrannu | cantarraggio cantarraie cantarrà cantarrammo cantarrate cantarranno | ghià cande(j) dà cande(j) và cande(j) mà cande(j) avit a cande(j) nà cande(j) | – | – | – | cjantarai cjantarâs cjantarà cjantarìn cjantarês cjantaran | ciantaré ciantaras ciantarà ciantaron ciantareis ciantarà | a cantarò t' cantarê al/la cantarà a cantarámm a cantarî i/al cantarân | a cantarò t cantarè e/la cantarà a cantarém a cantarìd i/al cantarà | cantiò ti cantiæ o/a cantià cantiemo cantiei cantian | canterai canteras canterà canteruma cantereve canteran | va cantar | cantara/ va cantar | cantarao/cantarai cantaràs cantarà cantaremos cantaretes cantaràn |
| Indicative | Conditional (Future in the past) | – | – | cantaria cantarias cantaria cantaríamos cantaríeis cantariam | cantaría cantarías cantaría cantariamos cantariades cantarían | cantaría cantarís cantaría cantaríemos cantaríais cantarín | cantaría cantarías cantaría cantaríamos cantaríais cantarían | kantaría kantarías kantaría kantaríamos kantaríax kantarían | cantaría cantarías cantaría cantarían(os) cantaríaz cantarían | cantaria cantaries cantaria cantaríem cantaríeu cantarien | cantariái cantariás cantariá cantariam cantariatz cantarián | chanterio/chanteriê chanteriês chanteriêt chanterians chanteriâds chanteriant | chanterais chanterais chanterait chanterions chanteriez chanteraient | /ʃɑ̃tʁɛ/ /ʃɑ̃tʁɛ/ /ʃɑ̃tʁɛ/ /ʃɑ̃təʁjɔ̃/ /ʃɑ̃təʁje/ /ʃɑ̃tʁɛ/ | canterei canteresti canterebbe canteremmo cantereste canterebbero | cantirìa cantirissi cantirìa cantirìamu cantirìavu cantirìanu | cantarrìa cantarrisse cantarrìa cantarriamo cantarrisseve cantarrìano | candiss candiss candess candessǝm candiss candessǝr | – | – | – | cjantarès cjantaressis cjantarès cjantaressin cjantaressis cjantaressin | – | a cantarèv t' cantarèss al/la cantrèv a cantarèven a cantarèssi i/al cantarèven | a cantarìa t cantarés e/la cantarìa a cantarésmi a cantarésvi i/al cantarìa | cantieiva ti cantiësci o/a cantieiva cantiëscimo cantiësci cantieivan | canterìa canterìe canterìa canterìo canterìe canterìo | vell cantar | cantarea/ velle cantar | cantaría/cantarío/cantareva/cantarevo cantarías/cantarevas cantaría/cantareva cantariamos/cantarevamos cantariates/cantarevates cantarían/cantarevan |
| Indicative | Future perfect | cantāverō cantāveris cantāverit cantāverimus cantāveritis cantāverint | *cantáre *cantáres *cantáret *cantáremos *cantáretes *cantárent | cantar cantares cantar cantarmos cantardes cantarem (Note: Its meaning has shifted to that of a future subjunctive in Spanish and Portuguese.) | cantar cantares cantar cantarmos cantardes cantaren | cantar(e) cantares cantar(e) cantáremos cantáreis cantaren | cantare cantares cantare cantáremos cantareis cantaren | - | – | – | – | – | – | – | – | – | – | – | – | – | – | – | – | – | – | – | – | – | – | – |
| Subjunctive | Present | cantem cantēs cantet cantēmus cantētis cantent | *cánte *cántes *cántet *cantémos *cantétes *cántent | cante cantes cante cantemos canteis cantem | cante cantes cante cantemos cantedes canten | cante cantes cante cantemos cantéis canten | cante cantes cante cantemos cantéis canten | kante kantes kante kantemos kantéx kanten | cante cantes cante cantem(os) cantez canten | canti cantis canti cantem canteu cantin | cante cantes cante cantem cantetz canten | chanteyo chanteyes chanteye chanteyens chanteyâds chanteyont | chante chantes chante chantions chantiez chantent | /ʃɑ̃t/ /ʃɑ̃t/ /ʃɑ̃t/ /ʃɑ̃tjɔ̃/ /ʃɑ̃tje/ /ʃɑ̃t/ | canti canti canti cantiamo cantiate cantino | cantu canti canta cantamu cantati càntanu | canto cante canta cantammo cantate cantano | candc cand cand candoim candoit candǝn | cânt cânți cânte cântăm cântați cânte | cante cantes cantet cantemus cantedes cantent | chantia chantias chantia chantian chantias chantian | cjanti cjantis cjanti cjantìn cjantais cjantin | ciante ciantes ciante cianton cianteis ciante | a canta t' cant al/la canta a cantàmma a cantèdi i/al canten | a chenta t chenta e/la chenta a cantémma a cantévva i/al chenta | cante ti canti o/a cante cantemmo cantæ cantan | canta cante canta canto cante canto | canta | canta | cante cantes cante cantemos cantetes canten |
| Subjunctive | Imperfect | cantārem cantārēs cantāret cantārēmus cantārētis cantārent | *cantáre *cantáres *cantáret *cantáremos *cantáretes *cantárent | cantar cantares cantar cantarmos cantardes cantarem (Note: Reanalysed as a personal infinitive. See below.) | cantar cantares cantar cantarmos cantardes cantaren | cantar(e) cantares cantar(e) cantáremos cantáreis cantaren | – | – | – | – | cantèssi cantèsses cantèsse cantèssem cantèssetz cantèsson | – | – | – | cantere canteres canteret canteremus canterezes canterent | – | – | – | – | – | cjantàs cjantassis cjantàs cjantassin cjantassis cjantassin | ciantasse ciantasses ciantassa ciantassan ciantassais ciantassa | – | a cantéss t cantéss e/la cantéss a cantéssmi a cantéssvi i/al cantéss | – | – | cantat | cantava | – | |
| Subjunctive | Pluperfect (Note: Its meaning has shifted to that of an imperfect subjunctive in most Romance languages, but as a pluperfect in Romanian and as a conditional in Romansh. But note the normal use, in modern south-eastern Umbrian of cantassimo instead of standard Italian cantammo to express an indicative past perfect.) | cantāvissem cantāvissēs cantāvisset cantāvissēmus cantāvissētis cantāvissent | *cantásse *cantásses *cantásset *cantássemos *cantássetes *cantássent | cantasse cantasses cantasse cantássemos cantásseis cantassem | cantase cantases cantase cantasemos cantasedes cantasen | – | cantase cantases cantase cantásemos cantaseis cantasen | – | cantase cantases cantase cantasen(os) cantásez cantasen | cantés cantessis cantés cantéssim cantéssiu cantessin | – | chantésse chantésses chantésse chantéssens chantéssâds chantéssont | chantasse chantasses chantât chantassions chantassiez chantassent | /ʃɑ̃tas/ /ʃɑ̃tas/ /ʃɑ̃ta/ /ʃɑ̃tasjɔ̃/ /ʃɑ̃tasje/ /ʃɑ̃tas/ | cantassi cantassi cantasse cantassimo cantaste cantassero | cantassi cantassi cantassi cantàssimu cantàssivu cantàssiru | cantasse cantasse cantasse cantàssemo cantàsseve cantàsseno | candiss candiss candess candessǝm candiss candessǝr | cântasem cântaseși cântase cântaserăm cântaserăți cântaseră | – | chantass chantasses chantass chantassen chantasses chantassen (Note: Its meaning has shifted to that of a conditional in Romansch.) | – | – | a cantéssa t' cantéss al/la cantéssa a cantéssen a cantéssi i/al cantéssen | – | cantesse ti cantesci o/a cantesse cantescimo cantesci cantessan | canteissa canteisse canteissa canteisso canteisso canteisse canteisso | – | – | cantasse/cantasso cantasses cantasse cantàssemos cantàssetes cantassen |
| Imperative (Note: Only the second person singular and plural given on these examples. Other forms, the first person plural and third persons are usually supplied by the subjunctive present tense, but indicative present tense and only supplies the first plural in French.) | | cantā cantāte | *cánta *cantáte | canta cantai | canta cantade | canta cantái | canta cantad | kanta kantad | canta cantaz | canta canteu | canta cantatz | chanta chantâds | chante chantez | /ʃɑ̃t/ /ʃɑ̃te/ | canta cantate | canta cantati | canta cantate | cand candoit | cântă cântați | canta cantade | chanta chantai | cjante cjantait | cianta cianton (Note: 1st person, plural) ciantede | canta cantê | chènta cantémma cantèd | canta cantæ | canta canté | canta | canta | canta cantate |

Note that the Vulgar Latin reconstructions are believed to have regularized word stress within each tense (except the present and imperative). Word-final ⟨e⟩ probably converged on /ə/. Many verb forms have undergone elisions, like the indicative pluperfect cantāveram > *cantára and the subjunctive imperfect cantāvissem > *cantásse.

== Vulgar Latin ==
In this section, "Vulgar Latin" is actually reconstructed as reconstructed Proto-Italo-Western Romance, most notably the shift from Classical Latin -i- and -u- to -e- /e/ and -o- /o/, as opposed to inherited /ɛ/ and /ɔ/ respectively. The developments include:

- The -v- of the perfect tenses were dropped or elided, but sometimes become /u/ after vowels.
- The past participle were sometimes sporadically rounded to *-ū-, this situation is preserved in French.
- The "unstressed" indicative imperfect is very likely from shortened *-bămus, *-bătis, yielding to the stress on the third-from-last syllable (cantā́bămus), as opposed to Classical Latin stress on the second-from-last syllable (cantābā́mus). Languages which retain this irregular stress were the languages of Iberia, Sicilian, and French.
- Romance metaphony. In forms containing -ī next to mid-open vowels, especially in preterite forms were heightened.

In the Proto-Romance grammatical tradition, the second and third conjugation are known as third conjugation, similarly to French.

=== First conjugation ===
Verbs in the first conjugation are in -āre (*-áre), later evolved to -are in Italian, -ar in most Romance languages and -er in French.

Vulgar Latin conjugation of *-áre
| Infinitive | | *-áre | | | | | |
| Present participle (Acc.) | | *-ánte | | | | | |
| Gerund | | *-ándu | | | | | |
| Past participle (Acc.) | | *-átu | | | | | |
| | | 1st singular | 2nd singular | 3rd singular | 1st plural | 2nd plural | 3rd plural |
| Indicative | Present | *-o (Note: Causes the previous syllable to be stressed (*amáre → *ámo).) | *-as | *-at | *-ámos | *-átes | *-ant |
| Indicative | Imperfect | *-ába | *-ábas | *-ábat | *-ábamos | *-ábates | *-ábant |
| Indicative | Preterite | *-ái | *-ásti | *-áut | *-ámos | *-ástes | *-áront |
| Indicative | Pluperfect | *-ára | *-áras | *-árat | *-áramos | *-árates | *-árant |
| Indicative | Future perfect | *-áro | *-áres | *-áret | *-áremos | *-áretes | *-árent |
| Subjunctive | Present | *-e | *-es | *-et | *-émos | *-étes | *-ent |
| Subjunctive | Imperfect | *-áre | *-áres | *-áret | *-arémos | *-arétes | *-árent |
| Subjunctive | Pluperfect | *-ásse | *-ásses | *-ásset | *-assémos | *-assétes | *-ássent |
| Imperative | | | *-a | | | *-áte | |

=== Second conjugation ===
Verbs in the second conjugation are in -ēre (*-ére), later evolved to -ere in Italian, -er in most Romance languages and -oir in French (no "regular" -oir verbs). Another infinitive -ere has merged into this paradigm.

Vulgar Latin conjugation of *-ére
| Infinitive | | *-ére | | | | | |
| Present participle (Acc.) | | *-énte | | | | | |
| Gerund | | *-éndu | | | | | |
| Past participle (Acc.) | | *-etu (Note: Causes the previous syllable to be stressed (*amáre → *ámo).) | | | | | |
| | | 1st singular | 2nd singular | 3rd singular | 1st plural | 2nd plural | 3rd plural |
| Indicative | Present | *-io | *-es | *-et | *-émos | *-étes | *-ent |
| Indicative | Imperfect | *-éba | *-ébas | *-ébat | *-ébamos | *-ébates | *-ébant |
| Indicative | Preterite | *-í | *-ísti | *-ét | *-émos | *-éstes | *-éront |
| Indicative | Pluperfect | *-éra | *-éras | *-érat | *-éramos | *-érates | *-érant |
| Indicative | Future perfect | *-éro | *-éres | *-éret | *-éremos | *-éretes | *-érent |
| Subjunctive | Present | *-ia | *-ias | *-iat | *-iámos | *-iátes | *-iant |
| Subjunctive | Imperfect | *-ére | *-éres | *-éret | *-éremos | *-éretes | *-érent |
| Subjunctive | Pluperfect | *-ésse | *-ésses | *-ésset | *-essémos | *-essétes | *-éssent |
| Imperative | | | *-é | | | *-éte | |

=== Third conjugation ===
Verbs in the third conjugation are in -ere (*-ere, caused stress in previous syllable), later merged with -ere (*-ere, causes stress in antepenultimate syllable), but -re in French and Catalan. The suffix -re in French are in the third group, also known as irregular verbs.

The -iō variant (*-io in Vulgar Latin) now defunct, later merged with the second conjugation; the paradigm now only exists in some descendants of the verb faciō.

Vulgar Latin conjugation of *-ere
| Infinitive | | *-ere (Note: Causes the previous syllable to be stressed (*amáre → *ámo).) | | | | | |
| Present participle (Acc.) | | *-énte | | | | | |
| Gerund | | *-éndu | | | | | |
| Past participle (Acc.) | | *-etu | | | | | |
| | | 1st singular | 2nd singular | 3rd singular | 1st plural | 2nd plural | 3rd plural |
| Indicative | Present | *-o | *-es | *-et | *-émos | *-étes | *-ont |
| Indicative | Imperfect | *-éba | *-ébas | *-ébat | *-ébamos | *-ébates | *-ébant |
| Indicative | Preterite | *-í | *-ísti | *-ét | *-émos | *-éstes | *-éront |
| Indicative | Pluperfect | *-éra | *-éras | *-érat | *-éramos | *-érates | *-érant |
| Indicative | Future perfect | *-éro | *-éres | *-éret | *-éremos | *-éretes | *-érent |
| Subjunctive | Present | *-a | *-as | *-at | *-ámos | *-átes | *-ant |
| Subjunctive | Imperfect | *-ére | *-éres | *-éret | *-éremos | *-éretes | *-érent |
| Subjunctive | Pluperfect | *-ésse | *-ésses | *-ésset | *-essémos | *-essétes | *-éssent |
| Imperative | | | *-e | | | *-éte | |

=== Fourth conjugation ===
Verbs in the fourth conjugation are in -īre (*-íre), later evolved to -ire in Italian, and -ir in most Romance languages. This conjugation type are infixed with once-inchoative -īsc- → *-ísc- in some languages, but its placement varies.

Vulgar Latin conjugation of *-íre
| Infinitive | | *-íre | | | | | |
| Present participle (Acc.) | | *-iénte | | | | | |
| Gerund | | *-iéndu | | | | | |
| Past participle (Acc.) | | *-ítu | | | | | |
| | | 1st singular | 2nd singular | 3rd singular | 1st plural | 2nd plural | 3rd plural |
| Indicative | Present | *-io (Note: Causes the previous syllable to be stressed (*amáre → *ámo).) | *-is | *-it | *-ímos | *-ítes | *-iont |
| Indicative | Imperfect | *-iéba | *-iébas | *-iébat | *-iébamos | *-iébates | *-iébant |
| Indicative | Preterite | *-i | *-ísti | *-it | *-ímos | *-ístes | *-íront |
| Indicative | Pluperfect | *-íra | *-íras | *-írat | *-íramos | *-írates | *-írant |
| Indicative | Future perfect | *-íro | *-íres | *-íret | *-íremos | *-íretes | *-írent |
| Subjunctive | Present | *-ia | *-ias | *-iat | *-iamos | *-iates | *-iant |
| Subjunctive | Imperfect | *-íre | *-íres | *-íret | *-íremos | *-íretes | *-írent |
| Subjunctive | Pluperfect | *-ísse | *-ísses | *-ísset | *-íssemos | *-íssetes | *-íssent |
| Imperative | | | *-i | | | *-íte | |

In Italian, Catalan, and Romanian, the infix -isc-; -esc-, -eix- (Catalan), and -ăsc- (Romanian) is placed on once-stressed indicative and subjunctive present forms (the first-, second-, third-singular and third plural present tenses), and stressed imperatives. In French, the infix -iss- is placed on all indicative present forms, the indicative imperfect, the subjunctive present, and plural imperatives.

While there are few non-infixed -īre verbs (also known are pure -īre verbs), in French the infixed verbs are the only regular verbs, otherwise irregular.

== Modern languages ==
While the nominal morphology in Romance languages is primarily agglutinative, the verbal morphology is fusional. The verbs are highly inflected for numbers (singular and plural), persons (first-, second-, and third-person), moods (indicative, conditional, subjunctive, and imperative), tenses (present, past, future), and aspects (imperfective and perfective).

Because of the complexities in Romance conjugation, certain languages have a separate article regarding these conjugations:

- Italian conjugation
- Spanish verbs
- Portuguese verb conjugation
- Romanian verbs
- French conjugation
- Catalan verbs
- Occitan conjugation
- Sardinian conjugation

While there are 4 regular infinitives in Classical Latin, namely -āre, -ēre, -ere, and -īre, some of these infinitive were merged. In many Romance languages including Spanish and Portuguese, the main infinitives are -ar, -er, and -ir, with addition of -ôr (Portuguese only) which only exists in the verb pôr, traditionally considered as -er verbs. While in Italian, the infinitives are -are, -ere, -ire. The infinitives -er and -ere (Italian) resulted from the merge of Latin infinitives -ēre and -ere. In French, the infinitives are -er, -oir, -re, -ir, but verbs with -oir and -re are in the third group, also known as irregular verbs.

Latin deponent verbs like sequor and nascor (infinitive sequī, nascī) changed to active counterparts *séquo and *násco (infinitive *séquere, *nascere), as in Portuguese seguir, Spanish seguir, and Italian seguire; and Portuguese nascer, Spanish nacer, and French naître.

== Irregularities ==
=== Orthographic variation ===
Spanish
| Hard | | Soft | |
| Back vowels | Front vowels | Back vowels | Front vowels |
|---|---|---|---|
| c- | quV- | z- | c- |
| g- | guV- | j- | g- |
| gu- | güV- | | |

In many Romance languages, verb stems ending in "soft" (i.e. historically palatalised) c and g have purely orthographic variation to indicate that the soft pronunciation is intended before back vowels. Thus in Spanish lanz-ar /lanˈθaɾ/ "to throw" has a first person singular subjunctive form lanc-e /ˈlanθe/ "that I throw" where both c and z represent the phoneme /θ/ (/s/ in most American varieties) in different situations. Likewise there is French mang-er /mɑ̃ˈʒe/ "to eat", commenc-er /kɔmɑ̃ˈse/ "to begin", first person plural present indicative nous mange-ons /nu mɑ̃ˈʒɔ̃/ and nous commenç-ons /nu kɔmɑ̃ˈsɔ̃/.

Conversely, there may be forms with a "hard" (historically un-palatalised) c and g throughout, as with toc-ar /toˈkaɾ/ "to touch", toqu-é /toˈke/ "I touched". A third type in Spanish is the small group of verbs with stems ending in /gw/, as averigu-ar /abeɾiˈgwaɾ/ "to find out", averigü-é "I found out". Such alternations are purely orthographic quirks, not true irregularities.

=== True irregular verbs ===
==== Copula ====
While the passive voice became completely periphrastic in Romance, the active voice has been morphologically preserved to a greater or lesser extent. The tables below compare the conjugation of the Latin verbs sum and stō in the active voice with that of the Romance copulae, their descendants. For simplicity, only the first person singular is listed for finite forms. Note that certain forms in Romance languages come from the suppletive sources sedeo (to be seated) instead of sum, e.g. subjunctive present: sedea > sia, sea, seja... (medieval Galician-Portuguese, for instance, had double forms in the whole conjugation: sou/sejo, era/sia, fui/sevi, fora/severa, fosse/sevesse...)

| Form | | Latin | | Italian | | French^{1} | | Spanish | | Portuguese | | Logudorese | | Catalan | | Sicilian | | Romansh | Romanian |
|---|---|---|---|---|---|---|---|---|---|---|---|---|---|---|---|---|---|---|---|
| Indicative | Present | sum | stō | sono | sto | suis | – | soy | estoy | sou | estou | so | isto | sóc | estic | sugnu | staiu | sun | sunt |
| Indicative | Imperfect | eram | stābam | ero | stavo | – | étais | era | estaba | era | estava | essia | istaia | era | estava | era | stava | era | eram |
| Indicative | Preterite | fuī | stetī | fui | stetti | fus | – | fui | estuve | fui | estive | essesi | istesi | fui | estiguí | fui | stesi | – | fui, fusei |
| Indicative | Pluperfect | fueram | steteram | – | – | – | – | fuera | estuviera | fora | estivera | – | – | fóra | estigués | fora | – | – | – |
| Indicative | Future^{2} | erō | stābō | sarò | starò | serai | – | seré | estaré | serei | estarei | – | – | seré | estaré | – | – | – | – |
| Subjunctive | Present | sim | stem | sia | stia | sois | – | sea | esté | seja | esteja | sia | iste | sigui, siga | estigui, estiga | – | – | saja | să fiu |
| Subjunctive | Perfect^{3} | fuerim | steterim | – | – | – | – | fuere | estuviere | for | estiver | – | – | – | – | – | – | – | – |
| Subjunctive | Imperfect | essem | stārem | – | – | – | – | – | – | ser | estar | essere | istere | – | – | – | – | – | – |
| Subjunctive | Pluperfect | fuissem | stetissem | fossi | stessi | fusse | – | fuese | estuviese | fosse | estivesse | – | – | fos | estigués | fussi | stassi | fiss | fusesem |
| Infinitive | | esse | stāre | essere | stare | être | – | ser | estar | ser | estar | essere | istare | ser, ésser | estar | siri | stari | esser | fire, a fi |
| Supine | | – | stātum | – | stato | – | été | sido | estado | sido | estado | essidu | istadu | estat, sigut, sét | estat | statu | statu | stà | fost |
| Gerund | | – | standum | essendo | stando | – | étant | siendo | estando | sendo | estando | essende | istande | sent, essent | estant | sennu | stannu | essend, siond | fiind |

1. In French the outcomes of sum and stō merged into a single verb paradigm; here the various forms are separated according to which root they descend from.
2. The future indicative tense does not derive from the Latin form (which tended to be confounded with the preterite due to sound changes in Vulgar Latin), but rather from an infinitive + habeō periphrasis, later reanalysed as a simple tense.
3. Formally identical to the future perfect indicative, the two paradigms merged in Vulgar Latin.

==== Other irregular verbs ====
- "To have": The verb habeō was regularly conjugated in Classical Latin, but later tends to be highly irregular in the Romance languages. The verb later transformed to *haveō in many Romance languages (but etymologically Spanish haber), resulting in irregular indicative present forms *ai, *as, and *at (all first-, second- and third-person singular), but ho, hai, ha in Italian and -pp- (appo) in Logudorese Sardinian in present tenses.

In Logudorese Sardinian, two -b-es lost in imperfect tenses.
In French, the past participle eu including the perfect stems (past historic and subjunctive imperfect stems) eu-/eû- rather evolved from earlier *habū-.

This is the Vulgar Latin conjugation of the verb *avére:

Vulgar Latin conjugation of *avére
| Infinitive | | *avére | | | | | |
| Present participle | | *avénte | | | | | |
| Gerund | | *avéndu | | | | | |
| Supine | | *áutu | | | | | |
| | | 1st singular | 2nd singular | 3rd singular | 1st plural | 2nd plural | 3rd plural |
| Indicative | Present | *áio | *áus | *áut | *avémos | *avétes | *áunt |
| Indicative | Imperfect | *avéba | *avébas | *avébat | *avébamos | *avébates | *avébant |
| Indicative | Preterite | *áui | *avésti | *áut | *avémos | *avéstes | *áuront |
| Indicative | Pluperfect | *avéra | *avéras | *avérat | *avéramos | *avérates | *avérant |
| Indicative | Future | *averáio | *averáious | *averáiout | *averavémos | *averavétes | *averáunt |
| Indicative | Conditional | *averavéba | *averavéba | *averavébat | *averavébamos | *averavébates | *averavébant |
| Indicative | Future perfect | *avéro | *avéres | *avéret | *avéremos | *avéretes | *avérent |
| Subjunctive | Present | *áia | *áias | *áiat | *aiámos | *aiátes | *áiant |
| Subjunctive | Imperfect | *avére | *avéres | *avéret | *avéremos | *avéretes | *avérent |
| Subjunctive | Pluperfect | *avésse | *avésses | *avésset | *avessémos | *avessétes | *avéssent |
| Imperative | | | *áu | | | *avéte | |

Notice that these forms sometimes also have an inconsistent form, as the table above more resembling with that of French.

- "To do": The verb faciō is also irregular in Classical Latin, with fēc- before perfect tenses (although the passive form of the verb was supplied by fīō, this suppletion is not included as the passive voice became periphrastic). This verb is one of the few verbs that retains perfect ablaut in Romance languages, with some changing the perfect stem to fi- due to metaphony rules.

== Semantic changes ==
In spite of the remarkable continuity of form, several Latin tenses have changed meaning, especially subjunctives.

- The gerund in Sardinian changed the final -o in -e (like the Proto-Romance present participle accusative form, extinguished in Sardinian). However, the French and Catalan suffixes -ant conflate with the accusative of present active participle suffix -āntem, and so the gerund sounds like the present participle, but ever present with "en".
- The supine disappeared, and remains just the past participle, with its stem, in all Romance languages.
- The pluperfect indicative became a conditional in Sicilian, and an imperfect subjunctive in Spanish.
- The pluperfect subjunctive developed into an imperfect subjunctive in all languages except Romansh, where it became a conditional, and Romanian, where it became a pluperfect indicative.
- The future perfect indicative became a future subjunctive in Old Spanish, Portuguese, and Galician.

The Latin imperfect subjunctive underwent a change in syntactic status, becoming a personal infinitive in Portuguese and Galician. An alternative hypothesis traces the personal infinitive back to the Latin infinitive, not to a conjugated verb form.

== Periphrases ==
In many cases, the empty cells in the tables above exist as distinct compound verbs in the modern languages. Thus, the main tense and mood distinctions in classical Latin are still made in most modern Romance languages, though some are now expressed through compound rather than simple verbs. Some examples, from Romanian:

- Perfect indicative: am fost, ai fost, a fost, am fost, ați fost, au fost;
- Future indicative: voi fi, vei fi, va fi, vom fi, veți fi, vor fi;
- Future perfect indicative: voi fi fost, vei fi fost, va fi fost, vom fi fost, veți fi fost, vor fi fost.

New forms also developed, such as the conditional, which in most Romance languages started out as a periphrasis, but later became a simple tense. In Romanian, the conditional is still periphrastic: aș fi, ai fi, ar fi, am fi, ați fi, ar fi.

== See also ==
- Romance languages
- Vulgar Latin
