= Sardinian conjugation =

Language composition of Sardinia

The conjugation of Sardinian verbs are mainly divided according to infinitives into -are, -ere, and -ire verbs in north-central dialects (including the Limba Sarda Comuna) for regular verbs, similar to the tripartite systems of Portuguese, Spanish, and Italian (all involve infinitives with thematic vowels -a-, -e-, and -i-). In southern dialects (including Campidanese dialect), these infinitives above change to -ai, -i, and -iri, respectively. Irregular verbs also exist as well. Many Sardinian conjugated forms were similar and conservative phonologically to Classical Latin, although the number of tenses were greatly reduced and the remaining tenses rely on periphrasis.

The conjugation of Sardinian verbs split into its own article due to possible diversity. The conjugations here are currently based on Limba Sarda Comuna, Logudorese dialect, and Campidanese dialect.

== Overview ==
Like other Romance languages, Sardinian verbs have a high degree of inflection. However, Sardinian conjugation is rather diverse, but less diverse compared to that of Occitan. Additionally, the indicative and subjunctive imperfect tenses of Campidanese come from Latin indicative perfect and subjunctive pluperfect, respectively. Also, the Latin indicative perfect evolved to poetic preterite in Logudorese dialect, the endings are (from 1SG > 2SG > 3SG > 1PL > 2PL > 3PL) -esi, -esti, -esit, -èsimus/-emus, -ezis, and -èsint. Sardinian once also preserved the Latin conjugation of the indicative pluperfect (e.g. sc. derat from lat. dederat, sc. fekerat / fecherat from Lat. fecerat, sc. furarat from VL. *furaverat, etc.), but has long fallen out of use. The tenses include (periphrases are in green):

- Infinitive (infinitivu)
- Participle (partitzípiu)
  - Past participle
- Gerund (gerùndiu)
- Indicative (indicativu)
  - Present (presentu)
  - Past present (passadu pròssimu): by adding indicative present forms of auxiliary verbs (either àere or essere) with past participle
  - Imperfect (imperfetu)
  - Past imperfect (passadu pròssimu): by adding indicative imperfect forms of auxiliary verbs with past participle
  - Future (fùturu): by adding indicative present forms of àere plus a and the infinitive
  - Future anterior (fùturu anteriore): by adding present forms of àere a with the infinitives of auxiliary verbs and past participle
- Conditional (conditzionale): by adding indicative imperfect forms of dèpere (in Logudorese and LSC) or ái(ri) plus a (in the transitional dialects and Campidanese), both with the infinitive
  - Conditional past: by adding imperfect forms of dèpere with the infinitives of auxiliary verbs and past participle
- Subjunctive (congiuntivu)
  - Present
  - Past (passadu): by adding subjunctive present forms of auxiliary verbs with past participle
  - Imperfect
  - Pluperfect (trapassadu): by adding subjunctive imperfect forms of auxiliary verbs with past participle
- Imperative (imperativu)
  - Negative imperative (forma negativa): by adding no with the subjunctive present forms

Similar to Portuguese and Spanish, imperative forms can only exist in 2SG and 2PL, but other forms (except 1SG) are supplied by present subjunctive forms.

The forms are mostly pronounced as they written, with the exception of forms ending in consonants are pronounced with an epenthetic vowel same as the last vowel next to the consonant (echo vowel), with the final unvoiced consonant being voiced intervocalically and voiced stops were further lenited also intervocalically to fricatives (cantas → càntasa [ˈkantaza], cantet → càntede [ˈkantɛðɛ]). Therefore, it is normally not reflected in the orthography, although the forms cantan, càntana, cantant, or càntanta of the 3PL ending in Logudorese are all acceptable (forms in -nt is used here).

=== Example of pronunciations of forms ===
==== Logudorese ====
Infinitive			tènnere		[ˈtɛnːɛɾɛ]	
Gerund			tenende		[tɛˈnɛɳɖɛ]	
Past participle			tentu		[ˈtentu]	
	Indicative		Subjunctive		Imperative	
Present	tèngio tenes tenet tenimus tenides tenent	[ˈtɛndʒɔ] [ˈtɛnɛzɛ] [ˈtɛnɛðɛ] [teˈnimuzu] [teˈniðɛzɛ] [ˈtɛnɛn(t)ɛ]	tèngia tèngias tèngiat tengiamus tengiais tèngiant	[ˈtɛndʒa] [ˈtɛndʒaza] [ˈtɛndʒaða] [tɛnˈdʒaːmuzu] [tɛnˈdʒajzi] [ˈtɛndʒan(t)a]	tene tengiais	[ˈtɛːnɛ] [tɛnˈdʒajzi]
Imperfect	tenia tenias teniat tenìamus teniais teniant	[teˈniː.a] [teˈniː.aza] [teˈniː.aða] [teˈniː.amuzu] [teˈniː.ajzi] [teˈniː.an(t)a]	tennere tenneres tenneret tenneremus tennereis tennerent	[tɛˈnːɛɾɛ] [tɛˈnːɛɾɛzɛ] [tɛˈnːɛɾɛðɛ] [tenːeˈɾeːmuzu] [tenːeˈɾejzi] [tɛˈnːɛɾɛn(t)ɛ]	—N/a	—N/a

==== Nuorese ====
Infinitive			appèrrere		[aˈpːɛrɛɾɛ]	
Gerund			apperende		[apːɛˈɾɛɳɖɛ]	
Past participle			appértu / apperta		[aˈpːertu] / [aˈpːɛrta]	
	Indicative		Subjunctive		Imperative	
Present	apperjo appéris appérit apperimus apperìes appérin	[aˈpːɛɾjɔ] [aˈpːeɾizi] [aˈpːeɾiti] [apːɛˈɾimuzu] [apːɛˈɾi.ɛzɛ] [aˈpːeɾini]	apperja apperjas apperjat apperjamus apperjazes apperjan	[aˈpːɛɾja] [aˈpːɛɾaza] [aˈpːɛɾata] [apːɛˈɾjamuzu] [apːɛˈɾjadzɛzɛ] [aˈpːɛɾjana]	appéri apperìe	[aˈpːeɾi] [apːɛˈɾi.ɛ]
Imperfect	apperìo apperìas apperìat apperiabamus apperiabazes apperìan	[apːɛˈɾi.ɔ] [apːɛˈɾi.aza] [apːɛˈɾi.ata] [apːɛɾi.aˈβamuzu] [apːɛɾi.aˈβadzɛzɛ] [apːɛˈɾi.ana]	apperrère(po) apperreres apperreret apperrerémus apperrerezes apperreren	[apːɛˈrɛɾɛ(pɔ)] [apːɛˈrɛɾɛzɛ] [apːɛˈrɛɾɛtɛ] [apːɛrɛˈɾemuzu] [apːɛrɛˈɾɛdzɛzɛ] [apːɛˈrɛɾɛnɛ]	—N/a	—N/a

== Auxiliary verbs: èssere and àere ==
Both verbs are highly irregular, they contain subjunctive forms in the imperative forms (in Campidanese, the verb ai is missing the past participle and imperative forms). Like other descendants of Latin verb sum (see also Romance copula), the verb èssere is suppletive, consisting of Latin verbs of (already suppletive) sum "I am" in remaining forms, and stō "I stand" in the past participle. The verb àere is only used as an auxiliary verb, the meaning of "to have" otherwise is by the verb tènnere, in central-southern dialects (see § Irregular verbs). In Logudorese dialect, the preterite (see § Overview) forms of èssere is fui, fusti/fisti/fis, fuit/fit, fimus/fimis, fustis/fizis, and fuint/fint, similarly, the preterite stem of àere is app-.

=== Èssere "to be" ===
Limba Sarda Comuna
Infinitive		èssere	
Gerund		essende	
Past participle		istadu	
	Indicative	Subjunctive	Imperative
Present	so ses est semus seis sunt	sia sias siat siamus siais siant	sias siais
Imperfect	fia fias fiat fiamus fiais fiant	essere esseres esseret esseremus essereis esserent	—N/a

Nuorese
Infinitive		èssere	
Gerund		essende	
Past participle		istàu / istada	
	Indicative	Subjunctive	Imperative
Present	soe ses est semus sezis sun	sìa sìas sìat siamus siazes sìan	—N/a; Replaced by istare: ista, istàe
Imperfect	fippo fis fit fimus fizis fin	essere(po) esseres esseret esseremus esserezes esseren	—N/a

Logudorese
Infinitive		essere	
Gerund		essende, sende	
Past participle		istadu	
	Indicative	Subjunctive	Imperative
Present	so ses est semus seis sunt	sia, sie sias, sies siat, siet siamus, siemus siades, siedas, siezis, siezas siant, sient	sias, sies siazes, siezes
Imperfect	fia, fio fias, fist fiat, fit fimus fizis fin	essére esséres esséret esséremus essérezis, essérezez essérent	—N/a

Campidanese
Infinitive		essi	
Gerund		sendi	
Past participle		stètiu, stau	
	Indicative	Subjunctive	Imperative
Present	seu ses est seus seis sunt, funt	sia sias siast siaus siais siant	siast siais
Imperfect	fia, femu fiast fiat, fut fiaus, femus fiais, festis fiant	fessi fessis fessit fèssimus fèssidis fessint	—N/a

=== Àere "to have" ===
Limba Sarda Comuna
Infinitive		àere	
Gerund		aende	
Past participle		àpidu	
	Indicative	Subjunctive	Imperative
Present	apo as at amus ais ant	apa apas apat apamus apais apant	apas apais
Imperfect	aia aias aiat aìamus aiais aiant	aere aeres aeret aeremus aereis aerent	—N/a

Nuorese
Infinitive		àere	
Gerund		aènde	
Past participle		àppiu/àppia	
	Indicative	Subjunctive	Imperative
Present	appo as at amus azes an	appa appas appat appamus appazes appan	—N/a
Imperfect	aìo, aìa aìas aìat abamus, ajabamus abazes, ajabazes aìan	aere(po) aeres aeret aeremus aerezes, aerezis aeren	—N/a

Logudorese
Infinitive		àere	
Gerund		a(pp)ende	
Past participle		appidu	
	Indicative	Subjunctive	Imperative
Present	appo as at amus ais ant	appa appas appat appamus appades, appazes appant	a appades
Imperfect	aia, aio aias aiat aì(a)mus ai(a)zis aiant	a(pp)ere a(pp)eres a(pp)eret a(pp)eremus a(pp)erezes a(pp)erent	—N/a

Campidanese
Infinitive		ai	
Gerund		endi	
Past participle		tentu	
	Indicative	Subjunctive	Imperative
Present	apu as at eus eis ant	apa apas apat apaus apais apant	(missing)
Imperfect	ia, emu iast iat iaus, emus iais, estis iant	essi essis essit èssimus èssidis essint	—N/a

For verbs with the auxiliary verb èssere, the past participle agrees with gender (masculine/feminine) and number (singular/plural) of the subject, for example (in 1SG and 1PL) apo àpidu; amus àpidu; but so istadu, -a; semus istados, -as. The verbs èssere and àere always use auxiliary verbs same as themselves.

== Verbs in -are: cantare ==
Verbs under this group are verbs whose the infinitive ends in -are, or -ai in southern dialects (incl. Campidanese). This group is derived from the Latin first conjugation infinitive, -āre.

Limba Sarda Comuna
Infinitive		cantare "to sing"	
Gerund		cantende	
Past participle		cantadu	
	Indicative	Subjunctive	Imperative
Present	canto cantas cantat cantamus cantades cantant	cante cantes cantet cantemus canteis cantent	canta cantade
Imperfect	cantaia cantaias cantaiat cantaìamus cantaiais cantaiant	cantare cantares cantaret cantaremus cantareis cantarent	—N/a

Nuorese
Infinitive		domare "to tame"	
Gerund		domande	
Past participle		domàu / domada	
	Indicative	Subjunctive	Imperative
Present	domo domas domat domamus domàes doman	dome domes domet domémus domedas domen	doma domàe
Imperfect	domabo domabas domabat domabamus domabazes domaban	domàre(po) domares domaret domarémus domarezes domaren	—N/a

Logudorese
Infinitive		cantare "to sing"	
Gerund		cantande	
Past participle		cantadu	
	Indicative	Subjunctive	Imperative
Present	canto cantas cantat cantamus cantades cantant	cante cantes cantet cantemus cantedes cantent	canta cantade
Imperfect	cantaìa cantaìas cantaìat cantaiamus cantaiazis cantaiant	cantere canteres canteret canteremus canterezis cantèrent	—N/a

Campidanese
Infinitive		cantai "to sing"	
Gerund		cantendi	
Past participle		cantau	
	Indicative	Subjunctive	Imperative
Present	cantu cantas cantat cantaus cantais cantant	canti cantis cantit canteus canteis cantint	canta cantai
Imperfect	cantamu cantàst cantàt cantamus cantastis cantànt	cantessi cantessis cantessit cantèssimus cantèssidis cantessint	—N/a
Past	—N/a	—N/a	—N/a

== Verbs in -ere: tìmere ==
Verbs under this group are verbs whose the infinitive ends in -ere, or -i in southern dialects. There are slight orthographic irregularity due to being accented in the infinitive and past participle (tìmere, tìmidu) but unaccented elsewhere due to default penultimate syllable stress (timo, times). This group is derived by the merger of the Latin second and third conjugation infinitives, (a)-ḗre and (á)-ere, respective, with the infinitive form favored the third one. Similar mergers also occurred in many Romance languages.

Limba Sarda Comuna
Infinitive		tìmere "to fear"	
Gerund		timende	
Past participle		tìmidu	
	Indicative	Subjunctive	Imperative
Present	timo times timet timimus timides timent	tima timas timat timamus timais timant	time timide
Imperfect	timia timias timiat timìamus timiais timiant	timere timeres timeret timeremus timereis timerent	—N/a

Nuorese
Infinitive		fàchere "to do"	
Gerund		fachende	
Past participle		fattu / fatta	
	Indicative	Subjunctive	Imperative
Present	faco faches fachet fachimus fachìes fachen	faca facas facat facamus facades facan	fache fachìe
Imperfect	fachìo, fachìa fachìas fachìat fachiabamus fachiabazes fachìan	fachère(po) facheres facheret facherémus facherezes facheren	—N/a

Logudorese
Infinitive		tìmere "to fear"	
Gerund		timende	
Past participle		tìmidu	
	Indicative	Subjunctive	Imperative
Present	timo times timet timimus timides tìment	tima timas timat timamus timades tìmant	time timide
Imperfect	timia timias timiat timiamus timiazis timiant	timere timeres timeret timeremus timerezis timèrent	—N/a

Campidanese
Infinitive		prandi "to have lunch"	
Gerund		prandendi	
Past participle		pràndiu	
	Indicative	Subjunctive	Imperative
Present	prandu prandis prandit prandeus prandeis prandint	pranda prandas prandat prandaus prandais prandant	prandi prandei
Imperfect	prandemu prandiast prandiat prandemus prandestis prandiant	prandessi prandessis prandessit prandèssimus prendèssidis prendessint	—N/a

== Verbs in -ire: finire ==
Verbs under this group are verbs whose the infinitive ends in -ire, or -iri in southern dialects. This group is derived from the Latin fourth conjugation infinitive, -īre. Unlike French (all pure -ir verbs are now irregular), Catalan, Romanian, or Italian; Sardinian does not make distinctions between verbs in pure -ire and inchoative -ire (whose some forms infixed with Latin once-inchoative infix -ēscō).

Limba Sarda Comuna
Infinitive		finire "to finish"	
Gerund		finende	
Past participle		finidu	
	Indicative	Subjunctive	Imperative
Present	fino finis finit finimus finides finent	fina finas finat finamus finais finant	fini finais
Imperfect	finia finias finiat finìamus finiais finiant	finire finires finiret finiremus finireis finirent	—N/a

Nuorese
Infinitive		finire "to finish"	
Gerund		fininde	
Past participle		finìu / finìa	
	Indicative	Subjunctive	Imperative
Present	fino finis finit finimus finìes finin	fina finas finat finamus finazes finan	fini finìe
Imperfect	finìo, finìa finìas finìat finiabamus finiabazes finìan	finìre(po) finires finiret finiremus finirezes finiren	—N/a

Logudorese
Infinitive		partire "to divide"	
Gerund		partinde	
Past participle		partidu	
	Indicative	Subjunctive	Imperative
Present	parto partis partit partimus partides pàrtint	parta partas partat partamus partades pàrtant	parti partide
Imperfect	partia partias partiat partiamus partiazis partìant	partire partires partiret partiremus partirezis partìrent	—N/a

Campidanese
Infinitive		partiri "to divide"	
Gerund		partendi	
Past participle		partiu	
	Indicative	Subjunctive	Imperative
Present	partu partis partit parteus parteis partint	parta partas partat partaus partais partant	parti partei
Imperfect	partemu partiast partiat partemus partestis partiant	partessi partessis partessit partèssimus partèssidis partessint	—N/a

== Irregular verbs ==
Only the important ones are listed here, excluding regular alterations of infinitive stems ending in hard -ch/-gh (before front vowels), or -c/-g (before back vowels) to -c/-g before back vowels and -ch/-gh before front vowels, or accented stems as shown at § Verbs in -ere: tìmere. This section excludes the irregular verbs èssere and àere, these verbs are included at the section § Auxiliary verbs: èssere and àere instead.

=== Tènnere "to have" ===
This verb is the meaning of "to have" when not used as an auxiliary verb (as opposed to ai), in central-southern dialects. The second-person imperative plural form uses the corresponding present subjunctive form. Pònnere "to put" and its derivatives are conjugated similarly to tènnere, but its past participle is postu instead of *pontu.

Limba Sarda Comuna
Infinitive		tènnere	
Gerund		tenende	
Past participle		tentu	
	Indicative	Subjunctive	Imperative
Present	tèngio tenes tenet tenimus tenides tenent	tèngia tèngias tèngiat tengiamus tengiais tèngiant	tene tengiais
Imperfect	tenia tenias teniat tenìamus teniais teniant	tennere tenneres tenneret tenneremus tennereis tennerent	—N/a

Campidanese
Infinitive		tenni	
Gerund		tennendi	
Past participle		tentu	
	Indicative	Subjunctive	Imperative
Present	tengu tenis tenit teneus teneis tenint	tenga tengas tengat tengaus tengais tengant	teni tenei
Imperfect	tennemu tenniast tenniat tennemus tennestis tenniant	tenessi tenessis tenessit tenèssimus tenèssidis tenessint	—N/a

=== Bènnere "to come" ===
While this verb conjugated similarly to tènnere, some forms has -i-, and the second-person plural imperative does not come from subjunctive present.

Limba Sarda Comuna
Infinitive		bènnere	
Gerund		benende	
Past participle		bènnidu	
	Indicative	Subjunctive	Imperative
Present	bèngio benis benit benimus benides benint	bèngia bèngias bèngiat bengiamus bengiais bèngiant	beni benide
Imperfect	benia benias beniat benìamus beniais beniant	bennere benneres benneret benneremus bennereis bennerent	—N/a

=== Fàghere "to do" ===
Pòdere "to be able" is conjugated similarly to fàghere, but the medial consonant of the infinitive is -d- and the past participle was pòdidu (pòtziu in Campidanese). Còghere "to cook" is also conjugated similarly to fàghere, but the present forms containing -tz- is replaced by -g-.

Limba Sarda Comuna
Infinitive		fàghere	
Gerund		faghende	
Past participle		fatu	
	Indicative	Subjunctive	Imperative
Present	fatzo faghes faghet faghimus faghides faghent	fatza fatzas fatzat fatzamus fatzais fatzant	faghe faghide
Imperfect	faghia faghias faghiat faghìamus faghiais faghiant	faghere fagheres fagheret fagheremus faghereis fagherent	—N/a

=== Dare "to give" ===
Limba Sarda Comuna
Infinitive		dare	
Gerund		dende	
Past participle		dadu	
	Indicative	Subjunctive	Imperative
Present	dao das dat damus dais dant	dia dias diat diamus diais diant	dae dage
Imperfect	daia daias daiat daìamus daiais daiant	dare dares daret daremus dareis darent	—N/a

Nuorese
Infinitive		dare	
Gerund		dande	
Past participle		dau	
	Indicative	Subjunctive	Imperative
Present	do das dat damus daes dan	dìa, dìe dìas, dìes dìat, dìet diamus, diémus diazes, diezes dìan, dìen	dae daze
Imperfect	dabo dabas dabat dabamus dabazes daban	dare(po) dares daret daremus darezes daren	—N/a

Campidanese
Infinitive		donai	
Gerund		dende, dande	
Past participle		dau, dadu	
	Indicative	Subjunctive	Imperative
Present	dongu, dònju donas dònat donaus donais dònant	dona(m)u donast donat donamus donastis donant	- dona donghit don(gh)eus donai don(gh)int
Imperfect	daia daias daiat daìamus daiais daiant	don(gh)essi don(gh)essis don(gh)essit don(gh)èssimus don(gh)estis don(gh)èssint	—N/a

=== Various verbs with minor irregularity ===
==== Andare "to go" ====
This verb is normally not suppletive and conjugated regularly as -are verbs in Limba Sarda Comuna, but suppletive similarly to verbs like French aller and Italian andare (all means "to go") in some dialects. In Campidanese and Logudorese, the imperative forms are suppletive, resulting on forms bai / baxi and bae / bazi, respectively.

==== Bàlere "to be worth" ====
This verb has irregular -gi- in indicative present (in 1SG) and subjunctive present tenses (bàgio; bàgia, bàgias, bàgiat, bagiamus, bagiais, bàgiant). In Campidanese, the -l- instead geminates to -ll- (ballu; balla, ...).

== See also ==
- Romance verbs
