= Collateral adjective =

Adjective identified with a noun from which it is not derived

A collateral adjective is an adjective that is identified with a particular noun in meaning, but that is not derived from that noun. For example, the word bovine is considered the adjectival equivalent for the noun cattle, but it is derived from a different word, which happens to be the Latin word for "cattle" (n.b. the collateral adjective for cow as specifically restricted to adult female cattle, is vaccine). Similarly, lunar serves as an adjective to describe attributes of the Moon; Moon comes from Old English mōna "moon" and lunar from Latin luna "moon". The adjective thermal and the noun heat have a similar semantic relationship. As in these examples, collateral adjectives in English very often derive from the Latin or Greek translations of the corresponding nouns. In some cases both the noun and the adjective are borrowed, but from different languages, such as the noun air (from French) and the adjective aerial (from Latin). The term "collateral" refers to these two sides of the relationship.

In English, most ordinal numbers sound like their cardinal numbers, such as the ordinal 3rd (third) sounding like the cardinal number 3 (three), 4th (fourth) sounding like 4 (four), 10th (tenth) sounding like 10 (ten), 117th (one-hundred seventeenth) sounding like 117 (one-hundred seventeen), etc. However, 1st (first) and 2nd (second) sound unfamiliar to their cardinal counterparts 1 (one) and 2 (two). This is because these two ordinal numbers were derived from different roots, with "first" being derived from the Proto-Indo-European root meaning "forward", and "second" deriving from the Latin word "secundus", meaning "following".

The phenomenon of ordinal numbers being collateral adjectives of cardinal numbers is common in the Sinospheric languages, including Japanese, Korean, and Vietnamese. For example, Japanese usually use Sino-Japanese numerals (words for numbers based on the Chinese language) for measure words that use ordinal numbers. Since Japanese, much like Chinese, does not have any inflections that indicate number, it uses measure words alongside a number to determine amounts of things. The numerals 1, 2, 3, 5, 6, 8, 9, and 10 usually use the pronunciation derived from Chinese (on'yomi), i.e. ichi, ni, san, go, roku, hachi, kyū, and jū respectively. However, 4 can be pronounced using either its on'yomi shi or its native Japanese pronunciation (kun'yomi) yon, depending on context, and likewise 7 can be pronounced either shichi or nana, depending on context. Most measure words require the speaker to use the Sino-Japanese on'yomi numbers, e.g. 3 years is sannenkan (3年間), 6 o'clock is rokuji (6時), 9 dogs is kyūhiki no inu (9匹の犬), 7 people is shichinin (7人), and 4 seasons is shiki (四季). However, there are some measure words (and even a select few numbers among certain measure words) that require the native kun'yomi numbers: 7 minutes is nanafun (7分), 4 apples is yonko no ringo (4個のリンゴ). Measure words that use native numbers include days of the month and tsu, which is the generic measure word that roughly translates into "things". 1–10 are hitotsu (1つ), futatsu (2つ), mittsu (3つ), yottsu (4つ), itsutsu (5つ), muttsu (6つ), nanatsu (7つ), yattsu (8つ), kokonotsu (9つ), and tō (10). While the measure word for people, nin (人), usually uses Sino-Japanese numbers, such as sannin (3人), hachinin (8人), and jūnin (10人), the measures for 1 and 2 people use the native numbers, which are hitori (1人) and futari (2人).

Attributive usage of a collateral adjective is generally similar in meaning to attributive use of the corresponding noun. For example, lunar rocket and moon rocket are accepted as synonyms, as are thermal capacity and heat capacity. However, in other cases the two words may have lexicalized uses so that one cannot replace the other, as in nocturnal view and night view, or feline grace but cat food (not *cat grace or *feline food).

Collateral adjectives contrast with derived (denominal) adjectives. For the noun father, for example, there is a derived adjective fatherly in addition to the collateral adjective paternal. Similarly, for the noun rain, there is derived rainy and collateral pluvial, and for child, there are derived childish and childlike as well as collateral infantile and puerile.

The term "collateral adjective" was coined by the Funk and Wagnalls dictionaries, but as they are currently out of print, the term has become rare. A synonym sometimes seen in linguistics is a suppletive (denominal) adjective, though this is a liberal and arguably incorrect use of the word 'suppletive'.

== See also ==
- List of collateral adjectives (Wiktionary)
- List of Germanic and Latinate equivalents in English
