= Joan Baptista Xuriguera i Parramona =

Catalan writer, translator and linguist (1908–1987)

Joan Baptista Xuriguera i Parramona (17 June 1908 – 17 October 1987) was a Catalan writer, translator and linguist.

He was born at Menàrguens, La Noguera, the brother of writer Ramon Xuriguera i Parramona, and studied in Lleida. He became a member of the Republican Left of Catalonia and of the Workers and Peasants' Bloc. After expatriating to France in 1936, he wrote the autobiographical novel La vida de Joan Ventura, which would be published in 1964–1987. He returned to Catalonia in December 1948.

His works include the novels Desembre and Hilds, and numerous plays for which Xuriguera won several awards.

He died at Barcelona in 1987.
