= Suppletion =

Word having inflected forms from multiple unrelated stems

In linguistics and etymology, suppletion is traditionally understood as the use of one word as the inflected form of another word when the two words are not cognates. For those learning a language, suppletive forms will be seen as "irregular" or even "highly irregular". For example, go:went is a suppletive paradigm, because go and went are not etymologically related, whereas mouse:mice is irregular but not suppletive, since the two words come from the same Old English ancestor.

The term "suppletion" implies that a gap in the paradigm was filled by a form "supplied" by a different paradigm. Instances of suppletion are overwhelmingly restricted to the most commonly used lexical items in a language.

== Irregularity and suppletion ==
An irregular paradigm is one in which the derived forms of a word cannot be deduced by simple rules from the base form. For example, someone who knows only a little English can deduce that the plural of girl is girls but cannot deduce that the plural of man is men. Language learners are often most aware of irregular verbs, but any part of speech with inflections can be irregular.

For most synchronic purposes—first-language acquisition studies, psycholinguistics, language-teaching theory—it suffices to note that these forms are irregular. However, historical linguistics seeks to explain how they came to be so and distinguishes different kinds of irregularity according to their origins.

Most irregular paradigms (like man:men) can be explained by phonological developments that affected one form of a word but not another (in this case, Germanic umlaut). In such cases, the historical antecedents of the current forms once constituted a regular paradigm.

Historical linguistics uses the term "suppletion" to distinguish irregularities like person:people or cow:cattle that cannot be so explained because the parts of the paradigm have not evolved out of a single form.

Hermann Osthoff coined the term "suppletion" in German in an 1899 study of the phenomenon in Indo-European languages.

Suppletion exists in many languages around the world. These languages are from various language families: Indo-Aryan, Dravidian, Semitic, Romance, etc.

For example, in Georgian, the paradigm for the verb "to come" is composed of four different roots (mi-, -val-, -vid-, and -sul-; მი-, -ვალ-, -ვიდ-, -სულ-).

Similarly, in Modern Standard Arabic, the verb jāʾ ('come') usually uses the form taʿāl for its imperative, and the plural of marʾah ('woman') is nisāʾ.

Some of the more archaic Indo-European languages are particularly known for suppletion. Ancient Greek, for example, has some twenty verbs with suppletive paradigms, many with three separate roots.

== Example words ==
=== To go ===
In English, the past tense of the verb go is went, which comes from the past tense of the verb wend, archaic in this sense. (The modern past tense of wend is wended.) See Go (verb).

The Romance languages have a variety of suppletive forms in conjugating the verb "to go", as these first-person singular forms illustrate (second-person singular forms in imperative):

Language	Imperative		Present		Subjunctive		Future		Preterite		Infinitive	
French	va, vas-y	1	vais	1	aille	4	irai	2	allai	4	aller	4
Romansh (Sursilvan)	va	1	mon	6	mondi	6	—		—		ir	2
Sardinian (Logudorese)	bai	1	ando	3	andaia, andaio	3	—		—		andare	3
Italian	vai, va, va'	1	vado, vo	1	vada	1	andrò	3	andai	3	andare	3
Occitan (Languedocien)	vai	1	vau	1	ane	3	anarai	3	anèri	3	anar	3
Catalan	vès	1	vaig	1	vagi	1	aniré	3	aní	3	anar	3
Spanish	ve^{tú}	1	voy	1	vaya	1	iré	2	fui	5	ir	2
Spanish	andá^{vos}	3	voy	1	vaya	1	iré	2	fui	5	ir	2
Portuguese	vai^{tu}	1	vou	1	vá	1	irei	2	fui	5	ir	2
Portuguese	ide^{vós}	2	vou	1	vá	1	irei	2	fui	5	ir	2

The sources of these forms, numbered in the table, are six different Latin verbs:

1. vādere ‘to go, proceed’,
2. īre ‘to go’
3. ambitāre ‘to go around’, also the source for Spanish and Portuguese andar ‘to walk’
4. ambulāre ‘to walk’, or perhaps another Latin root, a Celtic root, or a Germanic root halon or hala
5. fuī suppletive perfective of esse ‘to be’.
6. meāre ‘to go along’.

Many of the Romance languages use forms from different verbs in the present tense; for example, French has je vais ‘I go’ from vadere, but nous allons ‘we go’ from ambulare. Galician-Portuguese has a similar example: imos from ire ‘to go’ and vamos from vadere ‘we go’; the former is somewhat disused in modern Portuguese but very alive in modern Galician. Even ides, from itis second-person plural of ire, is the only form for ‘you (plural) go’ both in Galician and Portuguese (Spanish vais, from vadere).

Sometimes, the conjugations differ between dialects. For instance, the Limba Sarda Comuna standard of Sardinian supported a fully regular conjugation of andare, but other dialects like Logudorese do not (see also Sardinian conjugation). In Romansh, Rumantsch Grischun substitutes present and subjunctive forms of ir with vom and giaja (both are from Latin vādere and īre, respectively) in the place of mon and mondi in Sursilvan.

Similarly, the Welsh verb mynd ‘to go’ has a variety of suppletive forms such as af ‘I shall go’ and euthum ‘we went’. Irish téigh ‘to go’ also has suppletive forms: dul ‘going’ and rachaidh ‘will go’.

In Estonian, the inflected forms of the verb minema ‘to go’ were originally those of a verb cognate with the Finnish lähteä ‘to leave’, except for the passive and infinitive.

=== Good and bad ===
In Germanic, Romance (except Romanian), Celtic, Slavic (except Bulgarian and Macedonian), and Indo-Iranian languages, the comparative and superlative of the adjective "good" is suppletive; in many of these languages the adjective "bad" is also suppletive.

good, better, best
Language	Adjective	Etymology	Comparative	Superlative	Etymology
Germanic languages
English	good	Proto-Germanic: *gōdaz: Old English: gōd; Old High German: guot; Old Dutch: *guot; Old Norse: góðr; cognate to Sanskrit: gadhya, lit. 'what one clings to'	better	best	Proto-Germanic: *batizô: Old English: betera; cognate to OE bōt "remedy"; cognate to Sanskrit: bhadra "fortunate"
Danish	god	Proto-Germanic: *gōdaz: Old English: gōd; Old High German: guot; Old Dutch: *guot; Old Norse: góðr; cognate to Sanskrit: gadhya, lit. 'what one clings to'	bedre	bedst	Proto-Germanic: *batizô: Old English: betera; cognate to OE bōt "remedy"; cognate to Sanskrit: bhadra "fortunate"
German	gut	Proto-Germanic: *gōdaz: Old English: gōd; Old High German: guot; Old Dutch: *guot; Old Norse: góðr; cognate to Sanskrit: gadhya, lit. 'what one clings to'	besser	best-	Proto-Germanic: *batizô: Old English: betera; cognate to OE bōt "remedy"; cognate to Sanskrit: bhadra "fortunate"
Faroese	góður	Proto-Germanic: *gōdaz: Old English: gōd; Old High German: guot; Old Dutch: *guot; Old Norse: góðr; cognate to Sanskrit: gadhya, lit. 'what one clings to'	betri	bestur	Proto-Germanic: *batizô: Old English: betera; cognate to OE bōt "remedy"; cognate to Sanskrit: bhadra "fortunate"
Icelandic	góður	Proto-Germanic: *gōdaz: Old English: gōd; Old High German: guot; Old Dutch: *guot; Old Norse: góðr; cognate to Sanskrit: gadhya, lit. 'what one clings to'	betri	bestur	Proto-Germanic: *batizô: Old English: betera; cognate to OE bōt "remedy"; cognate to Sanskrit: bhadra "fortunate"
Dutch	goed	Proto-Germanic: *gōdaz: Old English: gōd; Old High German: guot; Old Dutch: *guot; Old Norse: góðr; cognate to Sanskrit: gadhya, lit. 'what one clings to'	beter	best	Proto-Germanic: *batizô: Old English: betera; cognate to OE bōt "remedy"; cognate to Sanskrit: bhadra "fortunate"
Norwegian Bokmål	god	Proto-Germanic: *gōdaz: Old English: gōd; Old High German: guot; Old Dutch: *guot; Old Norse: góðr; cognate to Sanskrit: gadhya, lit. 'what one clings to'	bedre	best	Proto-Germanic: *batizô: Old English: betera; cognate to OE bōt "remedy"; cognate to Sanskrit: bhadra "fortunate"
Norwegian Nynorsk	god	Proto-Germanic: *gōdaz: Old English: gōd; Old High German: guot; Old Dutch: *guot; Old Norse: góðr; cognate to Sanskrit: gadhya, lit. 'what one clings to'	betre	best	Proto-Germanic: *batizô: Old English: betera; cognate to OE bōt "remedy"; cognate to Sanskrit: bhadra "fortunate"
Swedish	god	Proto-Germanic: *gōdaz: Old English: gōd; Old High German: guot; Old Dutch: *guot; Old Norse: góðr; cognate to Sanskrit: gadhya, lit. 'what one clings to'	bättre	bäst	Proto-Germanic: *batizô: Old English: betera; cognate to OE bōt "remedy"; cognate to Sanskrit: bhadra "fortunate"
Romance languages
French	bon	Latin: bonus from Old Latin: duenos: cognate to Sanskrit: duva "reverence"	meilleur		Latin: melior; cognate to Latin multus "many"; cognate to Ancient Greek: μάλα, romanized: mala, lit. 'very'
Portuguese	bom	Latin: bonus from Old Latin: duenos: cognate to Sanskrit: duva "reverence"	melhor		Latin: melior; cognate to Latin multus "many"; cognate to Ancient Greek: μάλα, romanized: mala, lit. 'very'
Spanish	bueno	Latin: bonus from Old Latin: duenos: cognate to Sanskrit: duva "reverence"	mejor		Latin: melior; cognate to Latin multus "many"; cognate to Ancient Greek: μάλα, romanized: mala, lit. 'very'
Catalan	bo	Latin: bonus from Old Latin: duenos: cognate to Sanskrit: duva "reverence"	millor		Latin: melior; cognate to Latin multus "many"; cognate to Ancient Greek: μάλα, romanized: mala, lit. 'very'
Italian	buono	Latin: bonus from Old Latin: duenos: cognate to Sanskrit: duva "reverence"	migliore		Latin: melior; cognate to Latin multus "many"; cognate to Ancient Greek: μάλα, romanized: mala, lit. 'very'
Celtic languages
Scottish Gaelic	math	Proto-Celtic: *matis from Proto-Indo-European: *meh₂- "ripen", "mature"	feàrr		Proto-Celtic *werros from Proto-Indo-European: *wers- "peak"
Irish	maith	Proto-Celtic: *matis from Proto-Indo-European: *meh₂- "ripen", "mature"	fearr		Proto-Celtic *werros from Proto-Indo-European: *wers- "peak"
Breton	mat	Proto-Celtic: *matis from Proto-Indo-European: *meh₂- "ripen", "mature"	gwell, gwelloc'h (1)	gwellañ (1)	(1) Proto-Celtic: *u̯el-no-; (2) Proto-Celtic *u̯or-gous-on
Welsh	da	Proto-Celtic: *dagos "good", "well"	gwell (1)	gorau (2)	(1) Proto-Celtic: *u̯el-no-; (2) Proto-Celtic *u̯or-gous-on
Slavic languages
Polish	dobry	Proto-Slavic: *dobrъ	lepszy	najlepszy	Proto-Indo-European *lep-, *lēp- "behoof", "boot", "good"
Czech	dobrý	Proto-Slavic: *dobrъ	lepší	nejlepší	Proto-Indo-European *lep-, *lēp- "behoof", "boot", "good"
Slovak	dobrý	Proto-Slavic: *dobrъ	lepší	najlepší	Proto-Indo-European *lep-, *lēp- "behoof", "boot", "good"
Ukrainian	добрий	Proto-Slavic: *dobrъ	ліпший	найліпший	Proto-Indo-European *lep-, *lēp- "behoof", "boot", "good"
Serbo-Croatian	dobar	Proto-Slavic: *dobrъ	bolji	najbolji	Proto-Slavic: *boľьjь "bigger"
Slovene	dober	Proto-Slavic: *dobrъ	boljši	najboljši	Proto-Slavic: *boľьjь "bigger"
Russian	хороший, khoroshiy	probably from Proto-Slavic: *xorъ	лучше, luchshe	(наи)лучший, (nai)luchshiy	Old Russian лучии, neut. луче Old Church Slavonic: лоучии "more suitable, appropriate"
Indo-Iranian languages
Persian	خوب, khūb [xʊb] (Note: Poetic به, beh)	probably cognate of Proto-Slavic *xorъ (above). Not a satisfactory etymology for beh; but see comparative and superlative forms in comparison to Germanic	خوبتر, xūb-tar or بِهْتَر, beh-tar (Note: The superlative of beh- 'good' in Ancient Persian is beh-ist which has evolved to بهشت, behešt "paradise" in Modern Persian.)	خوبترین, xūb-tarīn or بِهْتَرين, beh-tarīn	From Proto-Indo-Iranian *Hwásuš "good". Not a cognate of the Germanic forms above.
Non-Indo-European languages
Georgian	კარგი, k'argi [kʼaɾgi].	possibly an Iranian borrowing via Old Armenian կարգ (karg, "order").	უკეთესი, uk'etesi [uk'e̞tʰe̞si].	საუკეთესო, sauk'eteso [sauk'e̞tʰe̞so̞].	From Proto-Georgian-Zan *ḳet- "to add, mix".

The comparison of "good" is also suppletive in Estonian: hea → parem → parim and Finnish: hyvä → parempi → paras.

bad, worse, worst
Language	Adjective	Etymology	Comparative	Superlative	Etymology
Germanic languages
English	bad	Uncertain, possibly from OE bæddel ("effeminate man, hermaphrodite, pederast"), related to OE bædan ("to defile") < Proto-Germanic *baidijaną ("constrain, cause to stay"); In OE yfel was more common, compare Proto-Germanic *ubilaz, Gothic ubils (bad), German übel (evil / bad), English evil	worse	worst	From Proto-Germanic *wirsizô, *wirsistaz.
Old Norse	vándr	From Proto-Germanic *wanh-.	verri	verstr	From Proto-Germanic *wirsizô, *wirsistaz.
Icelandic	vondur	From Proto-Germanic *wanh-.	verri	verstur	From Proto-Germanic *wirsizô, *wirsistaz.
Faroese	óndur	From Proto-Germanic *wanh-.	verri	verstur	From Proto-Germanic *wirsizô, *wirsistaz.
Norwegian Bokmål	ond, vond	From Proto-Germanic *wanh-.	verre	verst(e)	From Proto-Germanic *wirsizô, *wirsistaz.
Norwegian Nynorsk	vond	From Proto-Germanic *wanh-.	verre	verst(e)	From Proto-Germanic *wirsizô, *wirsistaz.
Swedish	ond	From Proto-Germanic *wanh-.	värre	värst	From Proto-Germanic *wirsizô, *wirsistaz.
Danish	ond	From Proto-Germanic *wanh-.	værre	værst	From Proto-Germanic *wirsizô, *wirsistaz.
Romance languages
French	mal (Note: These are adverbial forms ("badly"); the Italian adjective is itself suppletive (cattivo, from the same root as "captive", respectively) whereas the French mauvais is compound (malifātius < malus+fatum).)	Latin: malus	pire		Latin: peior, cognate to Sanskrit padyate "he falls"
Portuguese	mau	Latin: malus	pior		Latin: peior, cognate to Sanskrit padyate "he falls"
Spanish	malo	Latin: malus	peor		Latin: peior, cognate to Sanskrit padyate "he falls"
Catalan	mal (Note: Mal is used in Catalan before nouns, the form after nouns (dolent) is also suppletive (< Latin dolente "painful").)	Latin: malus	pitjor		Latin: peior, cognate to Sanskrit padyate "he falls"
Italian	male	Latin: malus	peggiore		Latin: peior, cognate to Sanskrit padyate "he falls"
Celtic languages
Scottish Gaelic	droch	Proto-Celtic *drukos ("bad") < (possibly) PIE *dʰrewgʰ- ("to deceive")	miosa		Proto-Celtic *missos < PIE *mey- ("to change")
Irish	droch	Proto-Celtic *drukos ("bad") < (possibly) PIE *dʰrewgʰ- ("to deceive")	measa		Proto-Celtic *missos < PIE *mey- ("to change")
Welsh	drwg	Proto-Celtic *drukos ("bad") < (possibly) PIE *dʰrewgʰ- ("to deceive")	gwaeth	gwaethaf	Proto-Celtic *waxtisamos ("worst")
Slavic languages
Polish	zły	Proto-Slavic *zъlъ	gorszy	najgorszy	compare Polish gorszyć (to disgust, scandalise)
Czech	zlý (špatný)	Proto-Slavic *zъlъ	horší	nejhorší	compare Polish gorszyć (to disgust, scandalise)
Slovak	zlý	Proto-Slavic *zъlъ	horší	najhorší	compare Polish gorszyć (to disgust, scandalise)
Ukrainian	archaic злий	Proto-Slavic *zъlъ	гірший	найгірший	compare Polish gorszyć (to disgust, scandalise)
Serbo-Croatian	zao	Proto-Slavic *zъlъ	gori	najgori	compare Polish gorszyć (to disgust, scandalise)
Russian	плохой (plokhoy)	probably Proto-Slavic *polxъ	хуже (khuzhe)	(наи)худший ((nai)khudshiy)	Old Church Slavonic хоудъ, Proto-Slavic *xudъ ("bad", "small")

Similarly to the Italian noted above, the English adverb form of "good" is the unrelated word "well", from Old English wel, cognate to wyllan "to wish".

=== Great and small ===
Celtic languages:

small, smaller, smallest
Language	Adjective	Comparative / superlative
Irish	beag (Old Irish bec < Proto-Celtic *bikkos)	níos lú / is lú (< Old Irish laigiu < Proto-Celtic *lagyūs < PIE *h₁lengʷʰ- ("lightweight"))
Welsh	bach (< Brythonic *bɨx < Proto-Celtic *bikkos)	llai / lleiaf (< PIE *h₁lengʷʰ- ("lightweight"))

great, greater, greatest
Language	Adjective	Comparative / superlative
Irish	mór (< Proto-Celtic *māros < PIE *moh₁ros)	níos mó / is mó < Proto-Celtic *māyos < PIE *meh₁-)
Welsh	mawr (< Proto-Celtic *māros < PIE *moh₁ros)	mwy / mwyaf < Proto-Celtic *māyos < PIE *meh₁-)

In many Slavic languages, great and small are suppletive:

small, smaller, smallest
Language	Adjective	Comparative / superlative
Polish	mały	mniejszy / najmniejszy
Czech	malý	menší / nejmenší
Slovak	malý	menší / najmenší
Slovene	majhen	manjši / najmanjši
Ukrainian	малий, маленький	менший / найменший
Russian	маленький (malen'kiy)	меньший / наименьший (men'she / naimen'shiy)

great, greater, greatest
Language	Adjective	Comparative / superlative
Polish	duży	większy / największy
Czech	velký	větší / největší
Slovak	veľký	väčší / najväčší
Slovene	velik	večji / največji
Ukrainian	великий	більший / найбільший

== Examples in languages ==
=== Albanian ===
In Albanian there are 14 irregular verbs divided into suppletive and non-suppletive:

Verb	Meaning	Present	Preterite	Imperfect
qenë	to be	jam	qeshë	isha
pasur	to have	kam	pata	kisha
ngrënë	to eat	ha	hëngra	haja
ardhur	to come	vij	erdha	vija
dhënë	to give	jap	dhashë	jepja
parë	to see	shoh	pashë	shihja
rënë	to fall, strike	bie	rashë	bija
prurë	to bring	bie	prura	bija
ndenjur	to stay	rri	ndenja	rrija

=== Ancient Greek ===
Ancient Greek had a large number of suppletive verbs. A few examples, listed by principal parts:

- erkhomai, eîmi/eleusomai, ēlthon, elēlutha, —, — "go, come".
- legō, eraō (erô) / leksō, eipon / eleksa, eirēka, eirēmai / lelegmai, elekhthēn / errhēthēn "say, speak".
- horaō, opsomai, eidon, heorāka / heōrāka, heōrāmai / ōmmai, ōphthēn "see".
- pherō, oisō, ēnegka / ēnegkon, enēnokha, enēnegmai, ēnekhthēn "carry".
- pōleō, apodōsomai, apedomēn, peprāka, peprāmai, eprāthēn "sell".

=== Bulgarian ===
In Bulgarian, the word човек, chovek ("man", "human being") is suppletive. The strict plural form, човеци, chovetsi, is used only in Biblical context (like "brethren" as the archaic or symbolic plural of "brother" in English). In modern usage it has been replaced by the Greek loan хора, khora. The counter form (the special form for masculine nouns, used after numerals) is suppletive as well: души, dushi (with the accent on the first syllable). For example, двама, трима души, dvama, trima dushi ("two, three people"); this form has no singular either. (A related but different noun is the plural души, dushi, singular душа, dusha ("soul"), both with accent on the last syllable.)

=== English ===
In English, the complicated irregular verb to be has forms from several different roots:

- be, been, being—from Old English bēon ("to be, become"), from Proto-Germanic *beuną ("to be, exist, come to be, become"), from Proto-Indo-European *bʰúHt ("to grow, become, come into being, appear"), from the root *bʰuH- ("to become, grow, appear").
- am, is, are—from Middle English am, em, is, aren, from Old English eam, eom, is, earun, earon, from Proto-Germanic *immi, *izmi, *isti, *arun, all forms of the verb *wesaną ("to be; dwell"), from Proto-Indo-European *h₁ésmi ("I am, I exist"), from the root *h₁es- ("to be").
- was, were—from Old English wæs, wǣre, from Proto-Germanic *was, *wēz, from the Proto-Indo-European root *h₂wes- ("to dwell, reside")

This verb is suppletive in most Indo-European languages, as well as in some non-Indo-European languages such as Finnish.

An incomplete suppletion exists in English with the plural of person (from the Latin persona). The regular plural persons occurs mainly in legalistic use. More commonly, the singular of the unrelated noun people (from Latin populus) is used as the plural; for example, "two people were living on a one-person salary" (note the plural verb). In its original sense of "populace, ethnic group", people is itself a singular noun with regular plural peoples.

=== Hungarian ===
- The verb "to be": van ("there is"), vagyok, vagy ("I am", "you are"), lenni ("to be"), lesz ("will be"), nincs, sincs ("there is not", "there is neither", replacing nem + van and sem + van respectively).
- The verb jön ("come") has the imperative gyere (the regular jöjj is dated).
- The numeral sok ("many/a lot") has the comparative több and the superlative legtöbb.
- The adverb kicsit ("a little") has the comparative kevésbé and the superlative legkevésbé.
- Many inflected forms of personal pronouns are formed by using the suffix as the base: nekem ("to me") from -nak/-nek (dative suffix) and -em (first person singular possessive suffix). Even among these, the superessive form ("on") uses the root rajta instead of the suffix -on/-en/-ön.
- The numerals egy, kettő ("one", "two") have the ordinal forms első, második ("first", "second"). However they are regular in compounds: tizenegyedik, tizenkettedik ("eleventh", "twelfth").

=== Irish ===
Several irregular Irish verbs are suppletive:

- abair (to say): derived from Old Irish as·beir, from Proto-Indo-European roots *h₁eǵʰs- ("out") and *bʰer- ("bear, carry"). However, the verbal noun rá is derived from Old Irish rád, ultimately from Proto-Indo-European *reh₂dʰ- ("perform successfully").
- bí (to be): derived from Proto-Indo-European *bʰuH- ("grow, become, come into being, appear"). However, the present tense form tá is derived from Old Irish at·tá, from Proto-Celtic *ad-tāyeti, ultimately from Proto-Indo-European *steh₂- ("stand").
- beir (to catch): derived from Proto-Indo-European *bʰer- ("bear, carry"). However, the past tense form rug is derived from Old Irish rouic, which is from Proto-Celtic *ɸro-ōnkeyo-, ultimately from Proto-Indo-European roots *pro- ("forth, forward") and *h₂neḱ- ("reach").
- feic (to see): derived from Old Irish aicci, from Proto-Indo-European *kʷey- ("observe"). However, the past tense form chonaic is derived from Old Irish ad·condairc, ultimately from Proto-Indo-European *derḱ₂- ("see").
- téigh (to go): derived from Old Irish téit, from Proto-Indo-European *stéygʰeti- ("to be walking, to be climbing"). However, the future form rachaidh is derived from Old Irish regae, ultimately from Proto-Indo-European *h₁r̥gʰ- ("go, move"), while the verbal noun dul is from *h₁ludʰét ("arrive").

There are several suppletive comparative and superlative forms in Irish; in addition to the ones listed above, there is:

- fada, "long"; comparative níos faide or níos sia — fada is from Old Irish fota, from Proto-Indo-European *wasdʰos ("long, wide"); compare Latin vāstus ("wide"), while sia is from Old Irish sír ("long, long-lasting"), from Proto-Celtic *sīros ("long"); compare Welsh/Breton hir.

=== Japanese ===
In modern Japanese, the copulae だ, である and です take な to create "attributive forms" of adjectival nouns (hence the English moniker, "na-adjectives"):

Irrealis 未然形	Adverbial 連用形	Conclusive 終止形	Attributive 連体形	Hypothetical 仮定形	Imperative 命令形
だろ -daro	だっ -daQ で -de に -ni	だ -da	な -na	なら -nara	

The "conclusive" and "attributive" forms, だ and な, were constructed similarly, from a combination of a particle and an inflection form of the old verb あり (ari, "to exist").

- で + あり ("conclusive") → であり → であ → だ
- に + ある ("attributive") → なる → なん → な

(Note: で itself was also a contraction of earlier にて.)

In modern Japanese, である ("conclusive") simply retains the older appearance of だ, while です is a different verb that can be used as a suppleted form of だ. Multiple hypotheses have been proposed for the etymology of です, one of which is a contraction of であります:

- で + あり ("adverbial") + ます → であります → です

The basic construction of the negative form of a Japanese verb is the "irrealis" form followed by ない, which would result in such hypothetical constructions as *だらない and *であらない. However, these constructions are not used in modern Japanese, and the construction ではない is used instead. This is because *あらない, the hypothetically regular negative form of ある, is not used either, and is simply replaced with ない.

- あら ("irrealis") + ない → ない
- であら ("irrealis") + ない → ではない
- だら ("irrealis") + ない → ではない → じゃない

While the auxiliary ない causes suppletion, other auxiliaries such as ん and ありません do not necessarily.

- あら ("irrealis") + ん → あらん
- あり ("adverbial") + ませ + ん → ありません
- であり ("adverbial") + ませ + ん → でありません

For です, its historical "irrealis" form, でせ has not been attested to create a negative form (only でせう → でしょう has been attested, and there were and are no *でせん and *でせない). Thus, it has to borrow でありません as its negative form instead.

To express a potential meaning, as in "can do", most verbs use the "irrealis" form followed by れる or られる. する, notably has no such construction, and has to use a different verb for this meaning, できる.

In addition, there are extensive suppletion forms in honorifics, too. Common verbs may be replaced by lexically unrelated forms according to the honorific relationship being expressed. Normally, a Japanese verb, forms its respectful honorific by お～になる construction, for example 書く kak-u ("to write") becomes お書きになる o=kak-i=ni nar-u, 読む yom-u ("to read") becomes お読みになる o=yom-i=ni nar-u.

However for many common words, they are replaced with different root formations, such as する suru ("do") → なさる nasaru (respectful) / いたす itasu (humble), 言う iu ("say") → おっしゃる ossharu / 申す mōsu, 行く iku ("go") → いらっしゃる irassharu / 参る mairu, and 食べる・飲む taberu/nomu ("eat/drink") → 召し上がる meshiagaru / いただく itadaku. Other respectful forms described as suppletive include いる iru ("be; stay") → いらっしゃる irassharu, 来る kuru ("come") → お見えになる omie ni naru, 見る miru ("see") → ご覧になる goran ni naru, and 死ぬ shinu ("die") → 亡くなる nakunaru.

=== Latin ===
Latin has several suppletive verbs. A few examples, listed by principal parts:

- sum, esse, fuī, futūrus - "be".
- ferō, ferre, tulī or tetulī, lātus - "carry, bear".
- fīō, fierī, factus sum (suppletive and semi-deponent) - "become, be made, happen"

=== Polish ===
In some Slavic languages, a few verbs have imperfective and perfective forms arising from different roots. For example, in Polish:

Verb	Imperfective	Perfective
to take	brać	wziąć
to say	mówić	powiedzieć
to see	widzieć	zobaczyć
to watch	oglądać	obejrzeć
to put	kłaść	położyć
to find	znajdować	znaleźć
to go in/to go out (on foot)	wchodzić, wychodzić	wejść, wyjść
to ride in/to ride out (by car)	wjeżdżać, wyjeżdżać	wjechać, wyjechać

Note that z—, przy—, w—, and wy— are prefixes and are not part of the root

In Polish, the plural form of rok ("year") is lata which comes from the plural of lato ("summer"). A similar suppletion occurs in Russian: год, romanized: god ("year") > лет, let (genitive of "years").

=== Romanian ===
The Romanian verb a fi ("to be") is suppletive and irregular, with the infinitive coming from Latin fieri, but conjugated forms from forms of already suppletive Latin sum. For example, eu sunt ("I am"), tu ești ("you are"), eu am fost ("I have been"), eu eram ("I used to be"), eu fusei/fui ("I was"); while the subjunctive, also used to form the future in o să fiu ("I will be/am going to be"), is linked to the infinitive.

=== Russian ===
In Russian, the word человек, chelovek ("man, human being") is suppletive. The strict plural form, человеки, cheloveki, is used only in Orthodox Church contexts, with numerals (e. g. пять человек, pyat chelovek "five people") and in humorous context. It may have originally been the unattested *человекы, *cheloveky. In any case, in modern usage, it has been replaced by люди, lyudi, the singular form of which is known in Russian only as a component of compound words (such as простолюдин, prostolyudin). This suppletion also exists in Polish (człowiek > ludzie), Czech (člověk > lidé), Serbo-Croatian (čovjek > ljudi), Slovene (človek > ljudje), and Macedonian (човек (čovek) > луѓе (lugje)).

== Generalizations ==
Strictly speaking, suppletion occurs when different inflections of a lexeme (i.e., with the same lexical category) have etymologically unrelated stems. The term is also used in looser senses, albeit less formally.

=== Semantic relations ===
The term "suppletion" is also used in the looser sense when there is a semantic link between words but not an etymological one; unlike the strict inflectional sense, these may be in different lexical categories, such as noun/verb.

English noun/adjective pairs such as father/paternal or cow/bovine are also referred to as collateral adjectives. In this sense of the term, father/fatherly is non-suppletive. Fatherly is derived from father, while father/paternal is suppletive. Likewise cow/cowish is non-suppletive, while cow/bovine is suppletive.

In these cases, father/pater- and cow/bov- are cognate via Proto-Indo-European, but 'paternal' and 'bovine' are borrowings into English (via Old French and Latin). The pairs are distantly etymologically related, but the words are not from a single Modern English stem.

=== Weak suppletion ===
The term "weak suppletion" is sometimes used in contemporary synchronic morphology in reference to sets of stems whose alternations cannot be accounted for by synchronically productive phonological rules. For example, the two forms child/children are etymologically from the same source, but the alternation does not reflect any regular morphological process in modern English: this makes the pair appear to be suppletive, even though the forms go back to the same root.

In that understanding, English has abundant examples of weak suppletion in its verbal inflection: e.g. bring/brought, take/took, see/saw, etc. Even though the forms are etymologically related in each pair, no productive morphological rule can derive one form from the other in synchrony. Alternations just have to be learned by speakers — in much the same way as truly suppletive pairs such as go/went.

Such cases, which were traditionally simply labelled "irregular", are sometimes described with the term "weak suppletion", so as to restrict the term "suppletion" to etymologically unrelated stems.

== See also ==
- Collateral adjective—denominal adjectives based on a suppletive root, such as arm ~ brachial
- Irregular verb
