= Language policy in France =

French as the sole official language

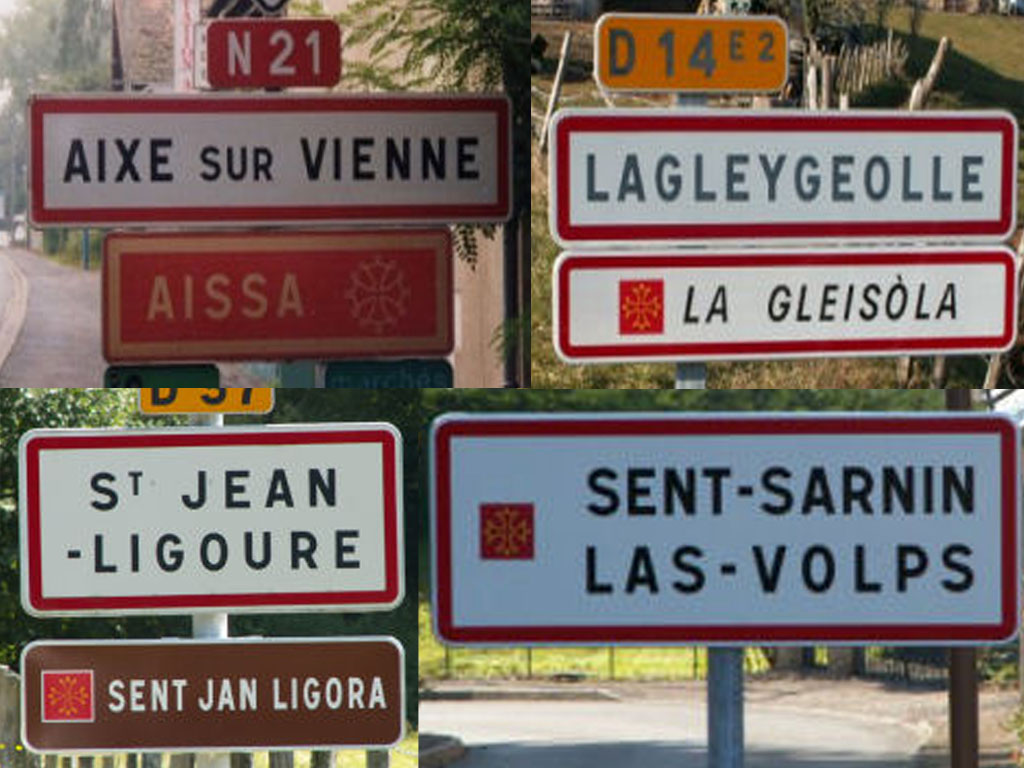
French / Occitan bilingual signs in Limousin

France has one official language, the French language. The French government does not regulate the choice of language in publications by individuals, but the use of French is required by law in commercial and workplace communications. In addition to mandating the use of French in the territory of the Republic, the French government tries to promote French in the European Union and globally through institutions such as La Francophonie. The perceived threat from Anglicization has prompted efforts to safeguard the position of the French language in France.

Besides French, there exist many other vernacular minority languages of France, both in European France, in Overseas France, and in French overseas territories. These languages are recognized by article 75-1 of the French constitution. The 1999 report written for the French government by Bernard Cerquiglini identified 75 languages (including just eight in continental France proper) that would qualify for recognition were the government to ratify the European Charter for Regional or Minority Languages (currently signed but not ratified).

== History ==
The Ordinance of Villers-Cotterêts of 1539 made French the administrative language of the kingdom of France for legal documents and laws. Previously, official documents were written in medieval Latin, which was the language used by the Roman Catholic Church. However, historians debate on whether the ordinance intended to abolish only Latin, or both Latin and the regional vernaculars. The Ordinance called for the use of langage maternel François (French vernacular), although previous royal edicts had defined François (King's French) and langage maternel (vernacular) as separate and distinct. Nevertheless, most provinces switched to the use of the King's French by 1539, with the exception of Navarre and Roussillon which continued the use of Gascon and Catalan respectively.

=== Académie française ===
The Académie française was established in 1635 to act as the official authority on the usages, vocabulary, and grammar of the French language, and to publish an official dictionary of the French language. Its recommendations however carry no legal power and are sometimes disregarded even by governmental authorities. In recent years the Académie has tried to prevent the Anglicisation of the French language.

=== French Revolution ===
Prior to the French Revolution of 1789, French kings did not take a strong position on the language spoken by their subjects. However, in sweeping away the old provinces, parlements and laws, the Revolution strengthened the unified system of administration across the state. At first, the revolutionaries declared liberty of language for all citizens of the Republic; this policy was subsequently abandoned in favour of the imposition of a common language which was to do away with the other languages of France. Other languages were seen as keeping the peasant masses in obscurantism.

The new idea was expounded in the 1794 Report on the necessity and means to annihilate the patois and to universalise the use of the French language. Its author, Henri Grégoire, deplored that France, the most advanced country in the world with regard to politics, had not progressed beyond the Tower of Babel as far as languages were concerned, and that only three million of the 25 million inhabitants of France spoke a pure Parisian French as their native tongue. The lack of ability of the population to understand the language in which were the political debates and the administrative documents was then seen as antidemocratic.

The report resulted the same year in two laws which stated that the only language tolerated in France in public life and in schools would be French. Within two years, the French language had become the symbol of the national unity of the French State. However, the revolutionaries lacked both time and money to implement a language policy.

=== Third Republic ===
In the 1880s, the Third Republic sought to modernize France, and in particular to increase literacy and general knowledge in the population, especially the rural population, and established free compulsory primary education.

The only language allowed in primary school was French. All other languages were forbidden, even in the schoolyard, and transgressions were severely punished. After 1918, the use of German in Alsace-Lorraine was outlawed. In 1925, Anatole de Monzie, Minister of public education, stated that "for the linguistic unity of France, the Breton language must disappear." As a result, the speakers of minority languages began to be ashamed when using their own language – especially in the educational system – and over time, many families stopped teaching their language to their children and tried to speak only French with them. In neighbouring Belgium, a parallel policy to expand the use of standard French also took place.

=== Fourth Republic ===
The 1950s were also the first time the French state recognised the right of the regional languages to exist. A law allowed for the teaching of regional languages in secondary schools, and the policy of repression in the primary schools came to an end. The Breton language began to appear in the media during this time.

=== Fifth Republic ===
The French government allowed in 1964 for the first time one and a half minutes of Breton on regional television. But even in 1972, president Georges Pompidou declared that "there is no place for minority languages in a France destined to make its mark on Europe".

In 1992 the constitution was amended to state explicitly that "the language of the Republic is French".

The Toubon Law (full name: law 94-665 of 4 August 1994 relating to usage of the French language) mandated the use of the French language in official government publications, in all advertisements, in all workplaces, in commercial contracts, in some other commercial communication contexts, in all government-financed schools, and some other contexts.

The law does not concern private, non-commercial communications, such as non-commercial web publications by private bodies. It does not concern books, films, public speeches, and other forms of communications not constituting commercial activity. However, the law mandates the use of the French language in all broadcast audiovisual programs, with exceptions for musical works and "original version" films.

Broadcast musical works are subject to quota rules under a related law whereby a minimum percentage of the songs on radio and television must be in the French language. A minimum of four in ten songs broadcast by domestic radio stations must be in the French language.

In 2006, under this law, a French subsidiary of a US company was fined €500,000 plus an ongoing fine of €20,000 per day for providing software and related technical documentation to its employees in English only.

In 2008, a revision of the French constitution creating official recognition of regional languages was implemented by the Parliament in Congress at Versailles.

In 2021, a law on regional languages was adopted by the parliament. However, its articles on immersion education in public schools and on use of regional languages' diacritics in civil records were vetoed by the Constitutional Council.

==== The debate about the Council of Europe's Charter for Regional or Minority Languages ====
In 1999 the Socialist government of Lionel Jospin signed the Council of Europe's European Charter for Regional or Minority Languages, but it was not ratified. The Constitutional Council of France declared that the Charter contains unconstitutional provisions since the Constitution states that the language of the Republic is French.

The European Charter for Regional or Minority Languages is a European convention (ETS 148) adopted in 1992 under the auspices of the Council of Europe to protect and promote historical regional and minority languages in Europe, ratified and implemented by 25 States, but not by France, as of 2014. The charter contains 98 articles of which signatories must adopt a minimum of 35 (France signed 39). The signing, and the failure to have it ratified, provoked a public debate in French society over the charter.

More recently, in a letter to several deputies dated 4 June 2015, François Hollande announced the upcoming filing of a constitutional bill for the ratification of the European Charter for Regional and Minority Languages. On 30 July 2015, the Council of State gave an unfavorable opinion on the charter. On 27 October 2015, the Senate rejected the draft law on ratification of the European Charter for Regional or Minority Languages driving away the assumption of Congress for the adoption of the constitutional reform which would have given the value and legitimacy to regional languages.

== Minority and endangered languages ==
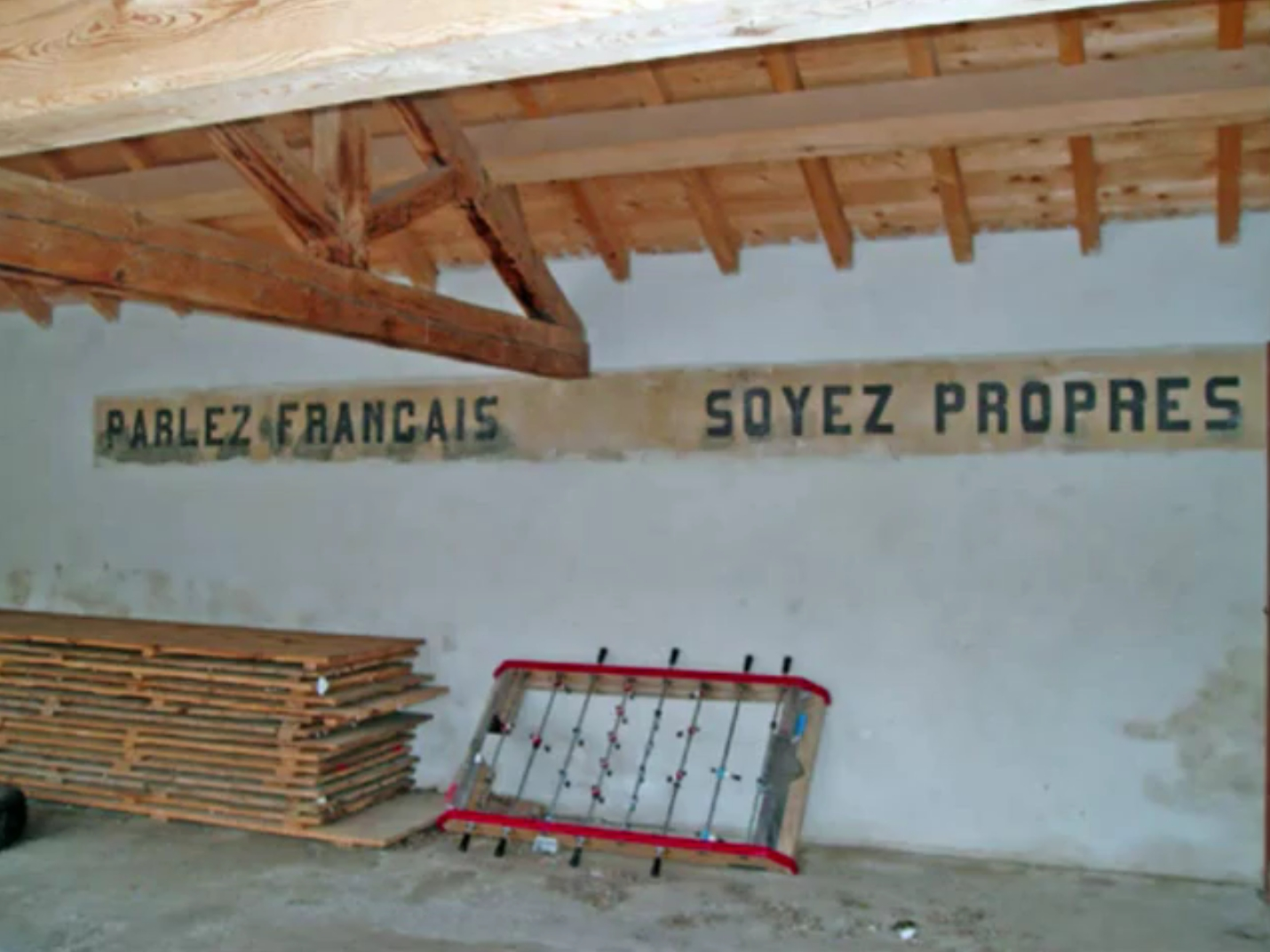
"Speak French, Be Clean", written on the wall of the Ayguatébia-Talau school

The non-French Oïl languages and Franco-Provençal are highly endangered; because of their similarity to standard French, their speakers conformed first in phonology, and then orthography much more readily. The other languages are still spoken but are all considered endangered.

In the 1940s, more than one million people spoke Breton as their main language. The countryside in western Brittany was still overwhelmingly Breton-speaking. Today, about 170,000 people are able to speak Breton (around 8% of the population in the traditionally Breton speaking area), most of whom are elderly. Other regional languages have generally followed the same pattern; Alsatian and Corsican have resisted better, while Occitan has followed an even worse trend.

Accurate information on the state of language use is complicated by the inability (due to constitutional provisions) of the state to ask language use questions in the census.

Since the rejection of ratification of the European Charter, French governments have offered token support to regional languages within the limits of the law. The Délégation générale à la langue française (General delegation of the French language) has acquired the additional function of observing and studying the languages of France and has had "et aux langues de France" ('...and languages of France') added to its title.

The French government hosted the first Assises nationales des langues de France in 2003, but this national round table on the languages of France served to highlight the contrast between cultural organisations and language activists on the one hand and the state on the other.

The decentralization has not extended to giving power in language policy to the regions. In fact, the use of regional languages at local government level is still severely contested. In 2022, some local councils in the traditionally Catalan-speaking department of the Pyrénées-Orientales, such as Elne, passed a modification of their statutes to allow the intervention in Catalan language by their elected members, as long as they provide an exact oral translation in French, as well a written French translation of the session. Despite being considered a symbolic gesture, the prefect of the Department, arguing that the political rights of French speakers will be violated, appealed to justice to repeal these initiatives. In April 2023, the Administrative Court of Montpellier sided with the Prefect, thus declaring illegal the decisions of the local councils.

In April 2021, France approved the "Molac" law (8 April 2021) which aims to protect and promote regional languages across the country. The law allows for schools to offer teaching in the medium of a regional minority language for the majority of the school day. However, the French Minister of Education, opposed to the teaching in minority languages, asked the Conseil Constitutionnel to declare it unconstitutional. This led to certain provisions of the law being constitutionally struck down on 21 May 2021.

Excluding the languages spoken in the overseas regions and other overseas territories, and the languages of recent immigrants, the following languages are spoken by sizeable minorities in France:

=== Celtic languages ===
Breton (Gwenedeg/Vannetais, Gwennraneg, Kerneveg, Leoneg, and Tregerieg)

=== Francosign languages ===
French Sign Language (LSF)

=== Germanic languages ===
Alsatian, Dutch (West Flemish/French Flemish), Lorrainian, Luxembourgish, and Yenish

=== Language isolate|Isolate languages ===
Basque/Euskara and Lyons Sign Language

=== Romance languages ===
- Gallo-Italic languages: Ligurian
- Gallo-Romance languages
  - Langues d'oïl: Angevin, Berrichon, Burgundian, Champenois, Frainc-Comtou, Gallo, Lorrain, Manceau, Mayennais, Normaund, Picard, Poetevin, Saintonjhais, and Walloon
  - Occitano-Romance languages: Auvergnat, Catalan, Gascon (Béarnese and Landese), Langadocian, Limousin, Niçard, Occitan, Provençal, and Vivaroalpenc
  - Arpitan languages: Burgondan, Dauphinois Nord/Isérois, Forézien, Franco-Provençal, Jurassien, Lyonnais (Bressan), Mâconnais, and Savoyard
- Ibero-Romance languages: Portuguese and Spanish (Castilian)
- Italo-Dalmatian languages: Corsican and Italian

=== Romani languages ===
Auvergnat Romani, Caló, and Sintikès

== Opposition to language policy ==
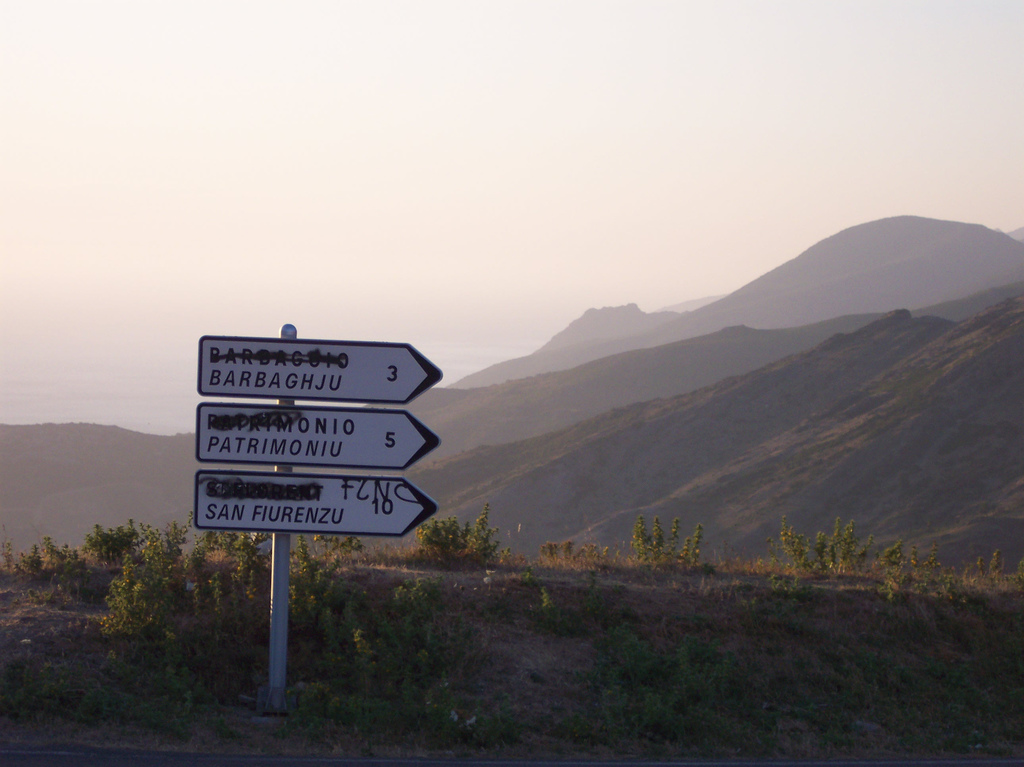
This roadsign in Corsica has had the non-Corsican placenames defaced by FLNC supporters.

According to French republican ideology (see also Laïcité), all citizens are ultimately Frenchmen and therefore no minority groups (i.e. ethnolinguistic groups) may exercise extra rights; this is an idea stemming from the French Revolution, contrasting with the previous situation in which many distinguishable groups had special rights and privileges in their regions.

This policy of cultural homogeneity has been challenged from both the right wing and the left wing. In the 1970s, nationalist or regionalist movements emerged in regions such as Brittany, Corsica and Occitania. Even though they remain a minority, networks of schools teaching France's regional languages have arisen, such as the Diwan in Brittany, the Ikastola in the Basque Country, the Calandreta in Occitania, and the La Bressola schools in Northern Catalonia.

Despite popular demand for official recognition, regional language teaching is not supported by the state. However, in certain areas, such as Brittany, regional councils maintain bilingual public schools as far as it is within the law. Other Breton education is provided by Catholic schools and private schools, Dihun and Diwan, respectively. In 2011, only 14,000 pupils were enrolled in French-Breton bilingual schools, although this number reflected an increase of around 30% from the year 2006, when the number of pupils was just over 11,000. The Ofis Publik ar Brezhoneg also reported in 2011 that a further 16,000 students from early childhood to adulthood were learning Breton as a second language (at primary schools, collèges, lycées, university or evening courses), bringing the total number of Breton learners to at least 30,000.

A long campaign of defacing road signs led to the first bilingual road signs in the 1980s. These are now increasingly common in Brittany, because of the help given by the Ofis ar Brezhoneg in bilingualizing many road, town hall and other official signs.

As far as the media are concerned, there is still little Breton to be found on the airwaves, although since 1982 a few Breton-speaking radio stations have been created on an associative basis. The launching of the Breton TV Breizh in 2000 was intended to offer wider coverage of Breton. However, Breton-language programme schedules gradually decreased in favour of French-language broadcasting, until in 2010 they totally disappeared.

In Corsica, the 1991 "Joxe Statute", in setting up the Collectivité Territoriale de Corse, also provided for the Corsican Assembly, and charged it with developing a plan for the optional teaching of Corsu. At the primary school level Corsu is taught up to a fixed number of hours per week (three in the year 2000) and is a voluntary subject at the secondary school level, but is required at the University of Corsica.

There is some opposition to the Loi Toubon mandating the use of French (or at least a translation into French) in commercial advertising and packaging, as well as in some other contexts.

== See also ==
- Académie de la Carpette anglaise
- Francization
- Language death
- Language planning
- Language policy
- Vergonha
