= Medium of instruction =

Language used in teaching

A medium of instruction (plural: media of instruction, or mediums of instruction) is a language used in teaching. It may or may not be the official language of the country or territory. If the first language of students is different from the official language, it may be used as the medium of instruction for part or all of schooling. Bilingual education or multilingual education may involve the use of more than one language of instruction. UNESCO considers that "providing education in a child's mother tongue is indeed a critical issue". In post-secondary, university and special education settings, content may often be taught in a language that is not spoken in the students' homes. This is referred to as content based learning or content and language integrated learning (CLIL). In situations where the medium of instruction of academic disciplines is English when it is not the students' first language, the phenomenon is referred to as English-medium instruction (EMI).

== In different countries and regions ==
=== Africa ===
- Ethiopia: Amharic, Oromo, and other Ethiopian languages serve as the medium of instruction in primary education, while English is used in secondary schools and universities (French had been the medium of instruction in public schools pre-1936).
- Kenya: English is the medium of instruction from Grade 4 onwards. In lower primary (Grades 1–3), the policy mandates the use of the language of the catchment area (indigenous language) or Swahili as the medium of instruction.
- Nigeria: the medium of instruction at all levels of education (primary, secondary, universities and colleges) is English.
- Rwanda: English is the sole medium of instruction at all levels of education (primary, secondary, universities and colleges). Prior to 2019, Kinyarwanda was used as the medium of instruction in lower primary (P1–P3).
- South Africa: students are taught primarily in their home language from Grade Zero (Reception Year) up to Grade 3. From Grade 4 onwards, English is the default language of learning and teaching, except for a minority of schools in which Afrikaans is used. The national curriculum requires that all students study at least two official languages as separate subjects, one of which must be studied at home language level and the other at least at first additional language level. The most common home language among the school population is isiZulu.
- Tanzania: Swahili is used in primary schools and adult education, whereas English is used in secondary schools and universities.
- Uganda: English is the medium of instruction from Primary 4 onwards. In Lower Primary (P1–P3), the Thematic Curriculum specifies the use of local languages as the medium of instruction.
- Zimbabwe: the use of English, Shona and Ndebele is established in education until the fourth grade; from the fourth grade, English is the medium of instruction.
- In the francophone states of Africa, education has typically been in French only.

=== Americas ===
==== Brazil ====
- Brazil: Every public school uses Brazilian Portuguese as the medium of instruction, but no law prohibits the use of other languages in private schools. Many schools use other European languages (mainly because of the country's European heritage) such as English, German, Italian or French. Public schools also have mandatory English and Spanish but only once or twice a week.

==== Canada ====
- Canada: almost all public schools use either English or French as the medium of instruction; French is standard in the province of Quebec (a few cities also offering English-language schools) and, along with English, in New Brunswick. The official language not used as the primary medium of instruction is taught as a mandatory subject in primary school and becomes optional for most secondary school students. Many public and private school systems in English jurisdictions also offer French immersion. In parts of Canada such as the Northwest Territories and Nunavut, some aboriginal languages, such as Inuinnaqtun and Tłı̨chǫ, are also used in local school systems. Heritage languages (immigrant or diaspora languages) are as also common across Canada in public and private schools.

==== United States ====
English is used, but in some schools, Spanish, French (in Louisiana), Hawaiian (in Hawaii), and local Native American/American Indian languages are used as well.

- The Cherokee Nation instigated a 10-year language preservation plan that involved growing new fluent speakers of the Cherokee language from childhood on up through school immersion programs as well as a collaborative community effort to continue to use the language at home. This plan was part of an ambitious goal that in 50 years, 80% or more of the Cherokee people will be fluent in the language. The Cherokee Preservation Foundation has invested $3 million into opening schools, training teachers, and developing curricula for language education, as well as initiating community gatherings where the language can be actively used. Formed in 2006, the Kituwah Preservation & Education Program (KPEP) on the Qualla Boundary focuses on language immersion programs for children from birth to fifth grade, developing cultural resources for the general public and community language programs to foster the Cherokee language among adults. There is also a Cherokee language immersion school in Tahlequah, Oklahoma that educates students from pre-school through eighth grade.

=== Asia ===
- Azerbaijan: Azerbaijani is the main language of instruction. Instruction in Russian and to a lesser extent in English at both secondary and postsecondary level is also offered in some educational institutions. Georgian is the language of instruction in secondary schools in the Georgian-populated northern regions.Education was conducted in Armenian in some secondary schools until the First Nagorno-Karabakh War.
- Bangladesh: Bengali and English are used as mediums of instruction. In universities, the medium of education is mainly English.
- People's Republic of China: Standard Chinese is used as the medium of instruction in most schools. In elementary and secondary schools for ethnic minorities, the minority languages, such as Mongolian, Uyghur, Tibetan and Korean, are also used.
- Georgia: Most schools conduct education in Georgian. The number of Azerbaijani schools is being reduced.
- Hong Kong: As a former British colony until 1997, it uses either English or Cantonese as the medium in most schools at the primary and secondary level. English-Medium-of-Instruction (EMI) schools adopt English as the medium of instruction for almost all classes. Chinese-Medium-of-Instruction (CMI) schools generally adopt Cantonese as the medium of instruction, but a significant number of CMI schools use English for high school courses. English is used almost exclusively at the tertiary level.
- Kazakhstan: As at 2024/2025, 67% of pupils studied in Kazakh, 30% in Russian and 2% in other languages (Uzbek, Uyghur and Tajik) in general education schools.
- Israel: Hebrew is the medium in most schools, and Arabic is the medium in elementary and secondary schools for the Arab minority. Hebrew is used almost exclusively at the tertiary level.
- India: the medium of instruction varies among English, Hindi and the respective states' official languages. Private schools usually prefer English, and government (primary/secondary education) schools tend to go with one of the last two. The medium of instruction in colleges and universities is English, Hindi or a regional language.
  - In Assam, Assamese or English is used.
  - In West Bengal, Bengali or English is used.
  - In Karnataka, Kannada or English is used.
  - In Goa, English or Konkani is used.
  - In Gujarat, Gujarati or English is used.
  - In Maharashtra, English or Marathi is used.
  - In Andhra Pradesh, Telugu or English is used. Some schools also use Sanskrit.
  - In Telangana, Telugu, or English is used.
  - In Tamil Nadu, Tamil or English is used.
  - In Kerala, Malayalam or English is used.
  - In Odisha, Odia or English is used.
- Japan: Japanese is used in most schools (including universities and colleges).
- (South Korea): In South and North Korea, Korean is used in most schools (including universities and colleges).
- Macau: Cantonese is used as the medium of instruction in many schools. Portuguese is used in Portugal-backed schools. English, which is not an official language of the region, is also used in many English-Medium-of-Instruction (EMI) schools.
- Pakistan: most public schools use Urdu, but private schools have English as medium of instruction. English was made medium of instruction in 18 colleges in 2008.
  - Government of the Punjab Notification No. PS/SSE/Misc/2009/176 dated 18-09-2009 required for the subjects of science and mathematics to be taught in English in each school.
- Taiwan: Standard Chinese is used as the medium of instruction in most schools, with more Taiwanese Hokkien presence in schools in recent years.
- Uzbekistan: As at 2021/2022, 85% of pupils studied in Uzbek, 10% in Russian, 2% in Karakalpak, 1% in Tajik. Turkmen, Kazakh and Kyrgyz are also used as medium of instruction in minority populated areas.

=== Southeast Asia ===
- Cambodia: Khmer is the medium in most schools, including universities.
- Indonesia: Indonesian is the medium in most schools, including universities.
- Laos: Lao is the medium in most schools, including universities.
- Malaysia: Malay is the medium of instruction in most schools. However, there are also Chinese and Indian schools serving the respective communities, which are allowed to use Mandarin and Tamil respectively as a medium of instruction, but Malay is still required to be taught as a subject. English-medium schools were present during the colonial period but were slowly phased out after independence. Today, all the former English-medium schools have since been converted to Malay-medium schools. Nevertheless, English continues to be a compulsory subject in all Malaysian schools.
- Philippines: English is the primary medium of instruction from preschool to university, except in the Philippine history and Filipino language subjects, in which Filipino is used. Recently, regional languages have been introduced as the medium of instruction in public schools for grades K–3 as part of the Department of Education's mother tongue-based education policy.
- Singapore: in pre-schools children learn in two languages: English and a mother tongue: Chinese, Malay or Tamil. The medium of instruction is English in all schools following the national curriculum except in "mother-tongue" subjects. International and private schools may use other languages. See also Special Assistance Plan.
- Thailand: Thai is the medium in most schools, including universities.
- Vietnam: Vietnamese is the medium in most schools, including universities.

=== Oceania ===
- Australia: most schools use English. However, in the State of Victoria (known for its many Greek and Italian settlers), there are a number of schools that teach in Greek and Italian. A few schools also teach in French, Chinese, Arabic and Japanese.
- New Zealand: English is used in many schools, but more and more kohanga reo (kindergarten) and kura kaupapa (primary and secondary school) are using Māori instead.
- Vanuatu: English and French are the main languages of education.

=== Europe ===
- Belarus: Russian is the main language of instruction. While schools using Belarusian schools are 53%, they are located mostly in rural areas, and the share of students who receive instruction in Belarusian is as low as 18%.
- Belgium: Dutch and French (German in some parts of Eastern Belgium) are used.
- Croatia: besides Croatian-language education, education of the representatives of national minorities is carried out in 24 elementary schools, and the program is conducted in the language and writing of a relevant national minority, 61 elementary schools having classes with such programs.
- Estonia: as of 2011, there were 463 Estonian-medium schools, 62 Russian-medium schools and 36 mixed medium schools, 25% of vocational education being in Russian while the remainder Estonian. In higher education, 90.2% is in Estonian, 7.8% in Russian and 1.85% in English.
- Finland: Finnish is the language used in most schools, but Swedish, also an official national language, is used in a number of schools along the coast and Åbo Akademi University. The right to education in Swedish is based in the constitution. There are also a few schools in which education is given, to some extent, in Sami in the north. See also Mandatory Swedish.
- France: legislation restricts languages other than French in state schools. Other languages of France are the medium of instruction in non-state schools such as Diwan Breton language-medium schools and the Calandretas in the south that use Occitan. See Language policy in France
- Iceland: Icelandic is used at all levels of education. English is the first secondary language to be taught (even starting a bit as early as kindergarten), with Danish also required later. Some universities teach in part in English in topics popular with foreigners (and "Icelandic for foreign students" is also offered).
- Ireland: English is used in most schools with a growing number of gaelscoileanna (10%) using Irish.
- Italy: Italian is the official language throughout the country, with French also official in Valle D'Aosta, and German in South Tirol.
- Latvia: Latvian is used in most schools. According to the Ministry of Foreign Affairs, education is available in eight national minority languages: Russian, Polish, Ukrainian, Belarusian, Lithuanian, Estonian, Hebrew and Romani. Boris Tsilevitch, politician and former chair of PACE sub-commission on minorities, notes that all minority schools (except the Russian and Polish ones) offer education in either Latvian or Russian, with corresponding minority language and culture taught as subjects. The network of Russian-language schools is being reduced. Some Polish-language schools were created after restoration of independence. Education in public minority high schools is conducted mostly in Latvian since 2004 despite wide protests by the Headquarters for the Protection of Russian Schools.
- Lithuania: As at 2004/2005, 91.3% of pupils studied in Lithuanian, 5.3% in Russian and 3.6% in Polish in general education schools.
- Moldova: Romanian and Russian are used in government-controlled area.
- North Macedonia: the state is obliged by the Ohrid Agreement to provide university level education in languages spoken by at least 20% of the population (Albanian)
- Norway: the medium of instruction is Norwegian. The state undertakes to provide a substantial part of preschool education in Sami, at least pupils whose families request it in sufficient numbers.
- Poland: the medium of instruction in most schools is Polish. However, in areas where national or ethnic minorities reside, there are also public schools using a minority language of instruction (such as German, Ukrainian, Belarusian, or Kashubian), or schools which offers classes of the minority language.
- Romania: the medium of instruction is mostly Romanian, but the state undertakes to provide education in minority languages up to the following levels. In Russian, it is a substantial part of preschool education, at least to those pupils whose families request it in sufficient numbers. In Bulgarian and Czech, it is a substantial part of primary education. In Croatian, it is a substantial part of secondary education. In Serbian, Turkish, Ukrainian and Slovak, it is secondary education. In German and Hungarian, it is higher education. There are also international schools where the medium of instruction is English.
- Russia: Russian is dominating in education. Approximately 6% of students learn at school in minority languages. Besides, some tertiary education establishments use Tatar as a language of instruction alongside Russian.
- Slovakia: education in minority languages must be provided in municipalities if Slovak citizens speaking respective language are more than 20% of population: higher, technical and vocational education in Hungarian, a substantial part of technical and vocational education in Ruthenian and Ukrainian, a substantial part of preschool education for those pupils whose families request it in sufficient numbers in Bulgarian, Croatian, Czech, German, Polish and Roma.
- Slovenia: the general medium of instruction is Slovene. In areas with the Hungarian ethnic minority, bilingual instruction in Slovene and Hungarian is compulsory. In the Italian ethnic community area, basic education can be provided in Slovene or Italian.
- Switzerland: German, French, Italian and/or Romansh are used in most schools.
- Ukraine: since the 2017 law "On Education" is language of instruction in Ukrainian schools is the state language, which is Ukrainian (national minorities are guaranteed the right to study in public educational facilities including their language alongside Ukrainian).

Prior to the 2017 law "On Education" the mediums of instruction in pre-school education were Ukrainian, Russian, Hungarian, Romanian, Moldovan, Crimean Tatar, English, Polish and German; in general education, Ukrainian, Russian, Hungarian, Romanian, Moldovan, Crimean Tatar, Polish, Bulgarian and Slovak; in vocational training, Ukrainian and Russian; in higher education, Ukrainian, Russian, Hungarian, Romanian.

- In the United Kingdom and the Crown dependencies, English is mostly used.
  - Isle of Man: English is used, but Manx is being revived with one Manx-medium school at St. John's.
  - Scotland: English is the primary language of instruction but Gaelic medium education is also available. There is little or no use of Lowland Scots as a medium of education.
  - Wales: most schools teach in English, but an increasing number teach in Welsh.
  - Cornwall: Cornish is used to some extent in some schools that otherwise teach in English.

== See also ==
- Native-language instruction
- English-medium education
- Language policy
- Language revival
- European Charter for Regional or Minority Languages
- Framework Convention for the Protection of National Minorities
