= Basque education system =

Education in the Basque Autonomous Community is entirely free from the age of 3 to 16, and compulsory between 6 and 16. The majority of students are educated in the Basque language.

== Levels of schooling ==
Education is divided into four levels:

- Infant education (first cycle): for children aged 0–3 — optional and available at a subsidised cost;
- Infant education (second cycle): for children aged 3–6 — optional and free;
- Primary education: for children aged 6–12 — compulsory and free;
- Secondary education: for children aged 12–16 — compulsory and free. Upon completion of this level of schooling, students with satisfactory grades have the option to continue their education for two additional years. Students will either pursue academic study in preparation for university entrance examinations, or follow a professional training course. Those who fall short of the satisfactory grades may attend professional initiation programmes as a precursor to entering the job market.

== Higher education ==
In addition to many institutions which specialise in vocational training, the Basque country boasts four universities:

- The publicly-owned University of the Basque Country;
- The Jesuit, privately-owned University of Deusto;
- The privately-owned University of Mondragón, part of the Mondragón Corporación Cooperativa;
- The privately-owned European University Gasteiz.

Additionally, the privately-owned, Opus Dei-governed University of Navarre has a campus in San Sebastián.

== Ikastolak ==
In the mid- to late 1960s, Basque language schools began to spring up all over the Southern Basque Country starting in nurseries and primary education. The new autonomous community of the Basque Country was granted autonomous powers with regard to education following the death of Franco in 1975, and the option of an education entirely in Basque in schools called ikastolak took a legal status. There are four types of school differentiated by their linguistic teaching models:

- Type X: education is entirely in Spanish;
- Type A: education is entirely in Spanish, with Basque as a compulsory subject;
- Type B: education is partly in Basque, partly in Spanish (usually mathematics and reading/writing);
- Type D: education entirely in Basque, with Spanish as a compulsory subject.

In 2024, 83% of children enrolling to infant education chose type D, while 14% chose type B, and 2% chose type A. This data reflects a growing trend of more students opting for an education with Basque, instead of Spanish, as the teaching language.

== Quality of education ==
According to the 2022 PISA report, Basque students have, on average, better mathematical competences than their Spanish, EU, and OECD peers. Reading and scientific competences are, on the other hand, similar to their Spanish, EU, and OECD counterparts.

== See also ==
- Education in Spain
- Euskal Herriak Bere Eskola
