= La Bressola =

La Bressola (Catalan pronunciation: [lə βɾəˈsɔlə]) is a cultural association founded in Perpignan, France in 1976 to promote a network of community-run schools engaged in Catalan language immersion programs in France, particularly in the comarques of North Catalonia. The first center was opened in Sant Galdric (Perpignan) in September 1976. Subsequently, other centers have been opened in Pesillà, El Vernet, Pontellà, Prades, El Soler, Canet and Sant Esteve del Monestir.

Since 1983, the schools of La Bressola have hosted students from two to eleven years. In 2005, they maintained eight educational centers for nursery and primary school children, one of them (El Soler) being, since 2003, the first to impart secondary education in Catalan in France. With seven primary schools and two high schools, some 1100 students are currently being taught.

Together with the Calandretas, the Diwan schools, the Seaska (the Ikastolas of the French Basque country) and the association ABCM-Zweisprachigkeit (French-Alsatian bilingual schools), form a confederation of immersive schools in France.

== Centers ==
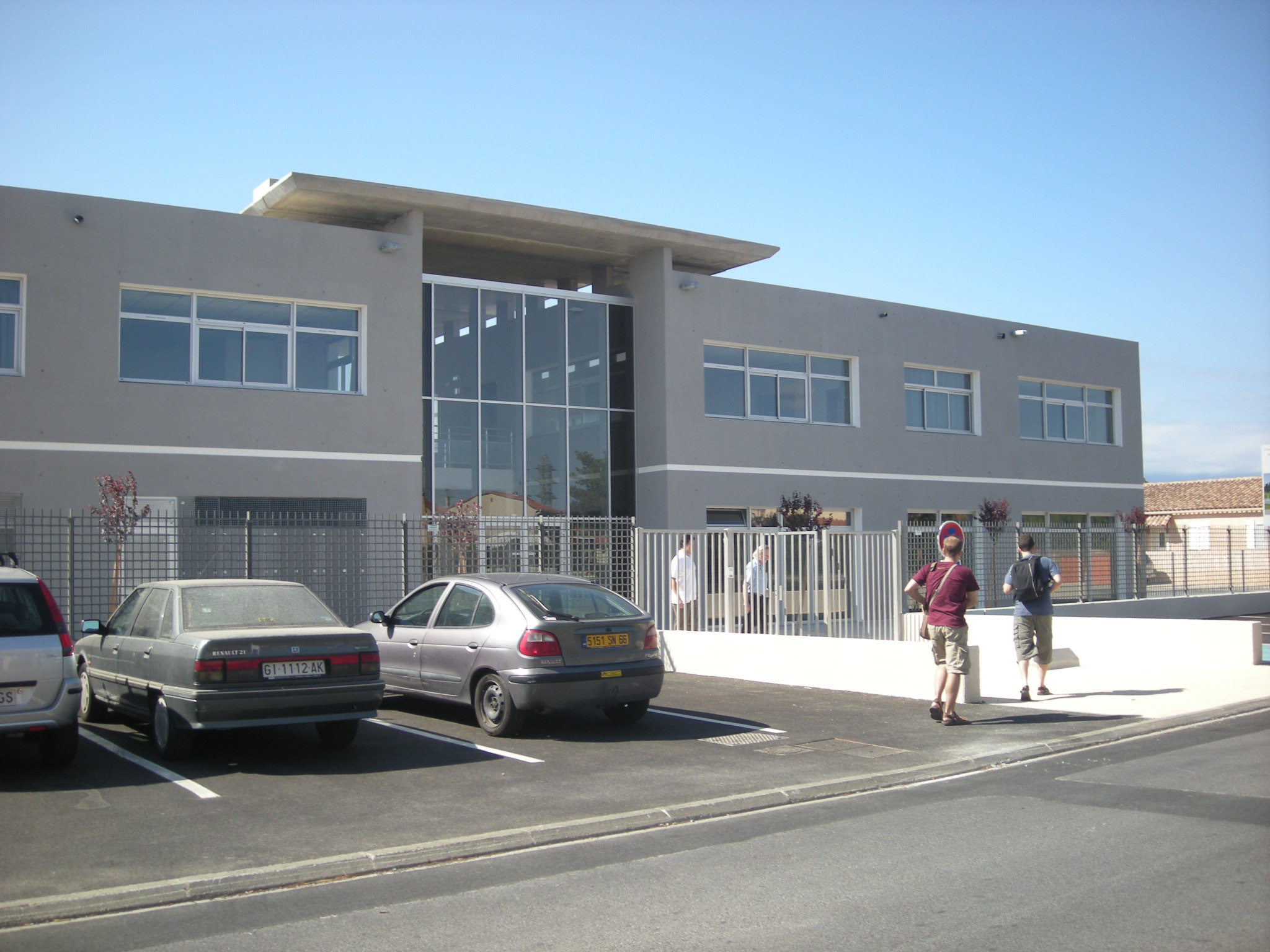
Pompeu Fabra High school in el Soler

- Pézilla-la-Rivière, Roussillon
- Nils (in the commune of Ponteilla, Roussillon)
- Prades, Conflent
- Saint-Estève, Roussillon
- Perpignan-Sant Galdric, Roussillon
- Perpignan- El Vernet, Roussillon
- Le Soler, Roussillon
- Col·legi Pompeu Fabra del Soler, Roussillon (High school)
- Col·legi Mas Rosselló, Canet, Roussillon (High school)

== Educational system ==
The schools practice a so-called "active pedagogy" and maintain a comparable level to its French-language counterparts. The administration's relations with the association, which since 1982 has tried to obtain government subsidies, have been difficult because of pressures for the introduction of bilingualism in equal parts. In 1995, the introduction of bilingual education at the end of primary school was agreed to. In 1987, the Generalitat of Catalonia awarded the Honor Award to Lluís Carulla and the Creu de Sant Jordi in 2007.

In 1981, a split led to the creation of the association Arrels, directed by Laura Manaut and Pere Manzanares. The general director is Joan Pere Le Bihan.

== Public support ==
In March 2007, the players of FC Barcelona, Lilian Thuram and Oleguer Presas participated in the reading of a manifesto in defense of the Catalan language and of these schools at a ceremony in Perpignan. The manifesto has been further supported by club president Joan Laporta, the coach of the France national football team Raymond Domenech, and the singers Manu Chao, Cali, the group Zebda, and I Muvrini.
