= A' Cleachdadh na Gàidhlig =

2011 book

A' Cleachdadh na Gàidhlig: slatan-tomhais ann an dìon cànain sa choimhearsnachd
- Language: Scottish Gaelic and English
- Genre: Language Policy and Planning
- Published: 2011 (Clò Ostaig)
- Publication place: Scotland
- Media type: Print Paperback
- Pages: 314 pp
- ISBN: 978-0-9562615-2-6

A' Cleachdadh na Gàidhlig: slatan-tomhais ann an dìon cànain sa choimhearsnachd is an anthology of essays edited by Richard A.V. Cox and Timothy Currie Armstrong addressing the current state of the Gaelic language and assessing efforts to effect language revitalization in Gaelic-speaking communities in Scotland. Published in 2011, the book was ground-breaking on several counts. It was the first book of its kind to address sociolinguistic and language planning issues surrounding the Gaelic-language revival predominantly written in the Gaelic language itself. It is also noteworthy and unusual for its breadth of analysis, drawing together academic research articles, articles by policy makers, and articles from activists and language development professionals reporting on specific Gaelic revitalization projects. Four of the articles address the Welsh language revival and make useful comparisons between initiatives in Wales and the revival in Scotland.

== Articles ==
- Co-aonta agus Ro-innleachd: Iomairt Charn Tóchair agus ath-leasachadh cànain aig ìre na coimhearsnachd, by Timothy Currie Armstrong
- Aig an Taigh le Gàidhlig: fianais thaiceil bho eòlas-inntinn, by Seonaidh Caimbeul
- Tobar an Dualchais: mar a chuireas am pròiseact ri cleachdadh na Gàidhlig, by Mairead Dhòmhnallach
- An Tèid aig an Lagh air Cleachdadh Mhion-Chànan a Bhrosnachadh? Achd na Gàidhlig agus Achdan Chànan Eile fon Phrosbaig, by Robert Dunbar
- The Camuscross Community Initiative: revitalising language use within a community, by Flòraidh Forrest, Iain MacKinnon, Gabhan Mac a’ Phearsain and Neil MacGillivray
- Virtual Gaelic Communities, by Donald J. Gillies
- Using Gaelic in the Classroom: the Highland Literacy Project in Gaelic-medium education, by John Howieson
- Waking the Dragon within: empowering local language communities, by Gareth Ioan
- Gaelic and Welsh in the Community: some reflections over 40 years, by Clive James
- Towards a National Welsh-medium Education Strategy, by Meirion Prys Jones
- Luchd-ionnsachaidh o thaobh a-muigh saoghal na Beurla: luchd-bruidhinn na Gàidhlig ris nach eil dùil? by Mìcheal Klevenhaus
- A’ Cleachdadh na Gàidhlig, a’ Brosnachadh an Spioraid: Buidheann Karate tro Mheadhan na Gàidhlig airson Sgoilearan na Bun-sgoile, by Sìleas Landgraf and Alasdair MacMhaoirn
- Cleachdadh na Gàidhlig san Ionad-obrach: MG ALBA, by Alison Lang
- Luachadh Sgilean Cànain anns an Àite-obrach, by Iain Mac an Tàilleir
- Can Animation Serve Tradition as Well as Language? by Leslie MacKenzie
- Planaichean Reachdail Gàidhlig: cothroman is cnapan-starra, by Wilson McLeod
- Foghlam Tràth agus Cùram Chloinne Meadhain-Ghàidhlig: bun cheistean is mòr dhùbhlain, by Wilson McLeod, Joanna McPake and Christine Stephen
- Dìlseachd, Lughad agus Saor-thoileachas: moladh airson iomairt Gàidhlig a dh’fhaodadh obrachadh, by Neil McRae
- A’ Cleachdadh na Gàidhlig sa Choimhearsnachd, by Magaidh Nic a’ Ghobhainn
- Cainnt nan Deugairean, by Mòrag Stiùbhart
- Trì Chearcallan Ceangailte: a’ leasachadh thobraichean ùra airson ath-nuadhachadh na Gàidhlig an Albainn Nuaidh, by Seumas Watson
- The Imperial Reach and the Reluctant Response, by Colin H. Williams
