= Toubon =

Toubon may refer to:

- Jacques Toubon (born 1941), French politician
- Toubon Law, relating to the use of the French language
