= Judeo-Gascon =

Jewish sociolect of the Gascon language

- Region: Bordeaux, Bayonne, South of Landes
- Ethnicity: Spanish and Portuguese Jews
- Language family: Indo-European: Italic; Latino-Faliscan; Latin; Romance; Italo-Western; Western; Gallo-Romance; Occitano-Romance; Occitan; Gascon; Judeo-Gascon
- Writing system: Latin

Language codes
- ISO 639-3: –

Judeo-Gascon is a sociolect of the Gascon language, formerly spoken among the Spanish and Portuguese Jews who settled during the 16th century in the cities of Bordeaux, Bayonne and in the south-west part of Landes of Gascony (most notably in Peyrehorade and Bidache). Judeo-Gascon, as Judeo-Provençal, the other major Jewish sociolect of Occitan, is now practically extinct.

Until recently, Judeo-Gascon was probably one of the least known dialects of Gascon and Occitan and the least studied from a linguistic point of view. Its first coverage in scholarship has been in Nahon (2017); its linguistic characteristics have been investigated in depth in Nahon (2018), alongside comprehensive critical editions of the surviving Judeo-Gascon texts.

== History ==
After the expulsion of the Jews from the Iberian Peninsula, some Iberian Jews, who were originally speakers of Portuguese and/or Spanish, settled in the South-West of France in Gascon-speaking areas. In the course of time, these Jews were linguistically assimilated to their Gascon-speaking environment, though Spanish was kept, alongside Hebrew, as a written language for administrative, liturgical, and literary purposes.

The variety of Gascon spoken by the Jews, in a situation of diglossia with these languages, received a strong linguistic imprint that caused it to diverge from the Gascon dialects spoken by the coterritorial Christian populations. Additional influences of Judeo-Italian, Judeo-Provençal and Western Yiddish occurred too, due to immigration of Jews from other communities to Gascony.

Judeo-Gascon was still spoken in the early 20th century but disappeared quickly after the Second World War.

It was superseded by a variety of French that retains a large number of lexical and morphological influences from Judeo-Gascon. This variety of French with Judeo-Gascon substrate is still spoken nowadays by a few dozens of speakers, some of which still know a few sentences in Judeo-Gascon.

== Phonetics ==
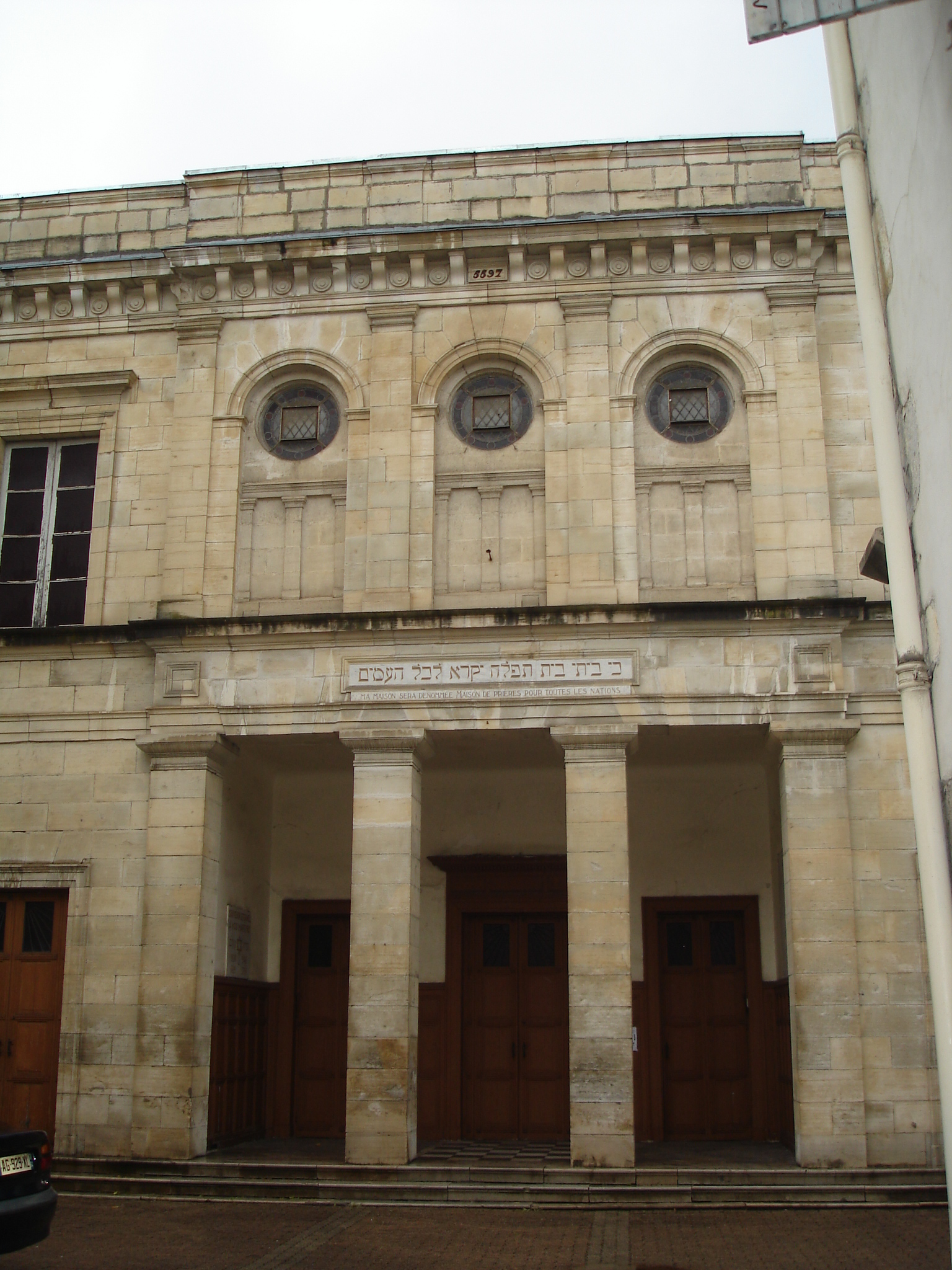
The synagogue of Bayonne, built in 1837.

The main phonetic feature of Judeo-Gascon, especially its Bayonne variety, is the realization as [e] of stressed and unstressed /e/, in contrast with its [œ] realization in the surrounding Western Gascon (also called gascon negue). This has been attributed by Nahon as an influence from the inland dialects or diglossia with Spanish.

== Lexical features ==
The most prominent feature of Judeo-Gascon is the high influx of loanwords from Hebrew, Spanish and Portuguese, adapted to the phonology of Gascon.

Hebrew loanwords include cheman Israël 'goodness!' (Hebr. šema yisrael), haroche or harocho 'disgusting, unpleasant' (Hebr. ḥaroset charoset), vécimento 'blessed!' (Hebr. besiman ṭob 'in a good omen'), sabbat 'Saturday' (Hebr. šabbat). Ibero-Romance loanwords include enridou 'tangle' (Sp./Port. enredo), bobou 'stupid', amoundeguille 'meat ball' (Sp. albondiguilla), and many others.

== Works ==
Most texts written in Judeo-Gascon date from the 19th and early 20th century. The only known earlier material are a few 18th-century Gascon nicknames borne by Jews in Gascony. All the other documents have been published and commented by Nahon. They include:

- three pieces of para-liturgical poetry, sang at the occasion of the Purim holiday. Two of them have been collected orally by Nahon in the 2010s, and are the last surviving specimens of Judeo-Gascon oral literature.
- several satirical works in verse and prose, including an important satire composed in 1837 for the inauguration of the main synagogue of Bayonne
- a Jewish holiday calendar (Calende yudiu) dated 1928, the last printed work in Judeo-Gascon.
- private correspondence.

== See also ==
- Spanish and Portuguese Jews
- Gascony
