= Diwan (school) =

Federation of Breton language-medium schools in Brittany (France)

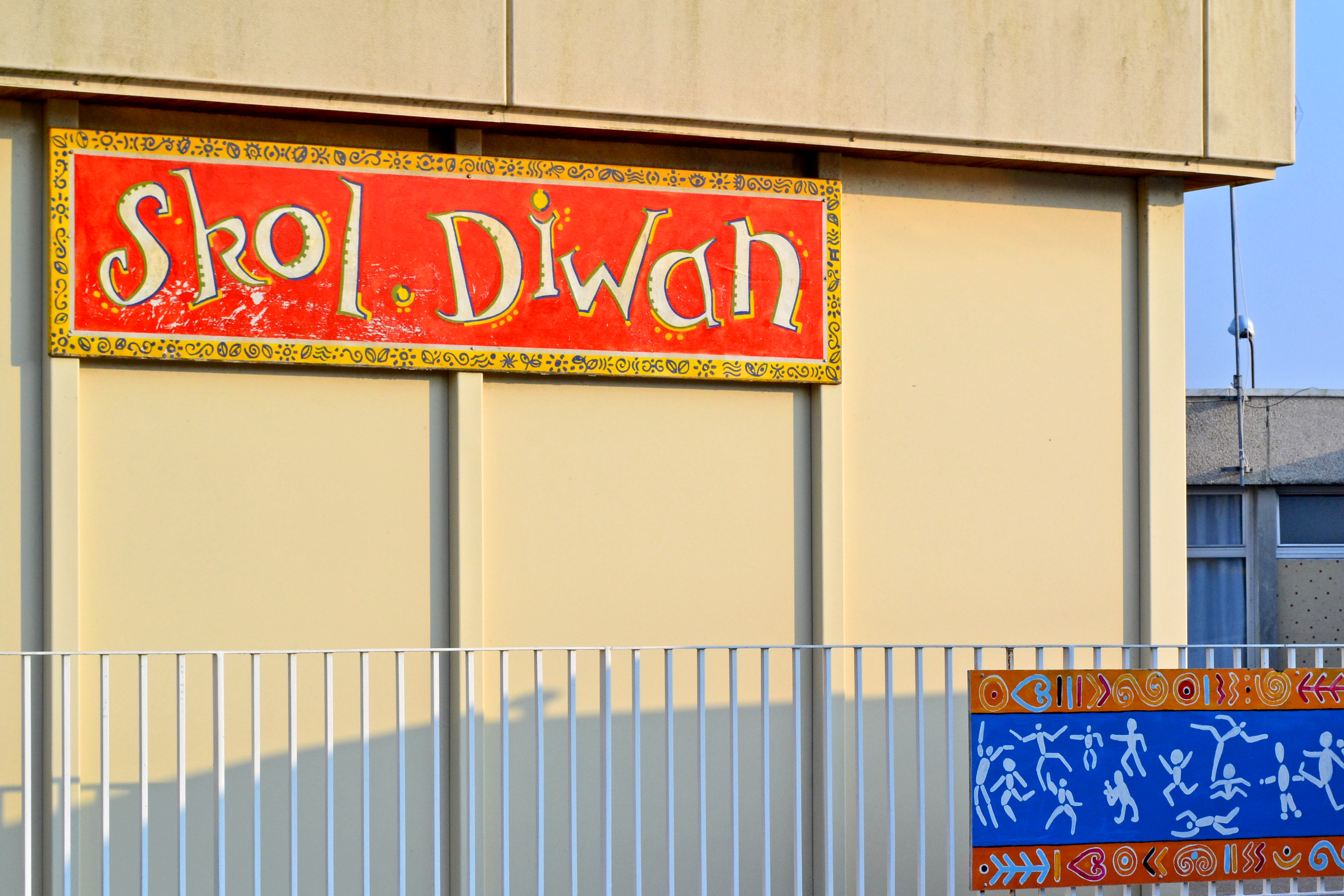
Skol Diwan Kastell Paol

Diwan (Breton: [ˈdiwɑ̃n]; "seed" in Breton) is a federation of Breton-medium schools in Brittany.

== Concept ==
The Diwan concept, which allows children to learn French and Breton through language immersion, was inspired by the Gaelscoileanna movement in Ireland, the Ikastolak movement in the Basque Country, and the Mudiad Ysgolion Meithrin movement in Wales, the Calandreta in Occitania and La Bressola of Northern Catalonia. However, as Diwan educates up to the age of eighteen, it most resembles the Welsh-medium education of Wales.

From ages two to six, Breton is the sole medium of instruction. At the age of seven and a half, French is introduced during two out of twenty-six school hours. When the pupils are ten, French (six hours out of twenty-three) is taught at the same level as Breton. This remains the same when they reach middle school but English and a choice of Spanish or German are taught in addition.

== History ==
According to Jelle Krol, the strictness with which the Third French Republic imposed its French-only policy throughout the educational system as well as its rejection of all requests for classes in minority languages must be seen in the light of France's humiliating defeat in the Franco-Prussian War and the resulting Germanophobia and Revanchism over the loss of Alsace and Lorraine. The Government of the Republic was accordingly unwilling to tolerate the German language and other minority languages in French schools or society.

The first Diwan school was created by a few parents in 1977 at Lampaul-Ploudalmézeau (Breton: Lambaol-Gwitalmeze) near Brest, because the centralised French state schools were unwilling to offer the Breton language in the curriculum. The initial nursery school was followed by the first primary school in 1980, the first collège in 1988 and the first lycée in 1994.

In 2008, Diwan schools celebrated their 30th anniversary and organised Ar Redadeg, a non-stop foot race through Brittany in support of Breton-language learning in schools, which has little support from the French central government.

In 2019–2020 4,307 pupils attended Diwan schools throughout Brittany at all levels from preschool to the Baccalauréat. The network included 48 primary-level schools and 8 secondary schools (six collèges and two lycées).

== Schools formed ==
- 1977 : Formation of Diwan. Gweltaz ar Fur as first chairman.
- May 1977 : Opening of the first class with just 5 children at Lambaol-Gwitalmeze (Denez Abernot as the first teacher)
- September 1977 : Opening of Diwan school in Kemper (Quimper fr.)
- September 1980 : Opening of first "primary school" class.
- September 1988 : Opening of first "secondary school" class. skolaj Diwan kentañ e Brest with 8 pupils this relocated two years later to a larger site near Brest in Releg-Kerhuon.
- September 1994 : Opening of first "upper secondary school" lise Diwan at Releg-Kerhuon.
- September 1995 : Opening of the second "secondary school" at Plijidi in the department of Aodoù an Arvor (Cotes d'Armor fr.) Soon followed by another at Kemper and one at Plañvour (relocated now to Wened (Vannes fr.). Further units were also formed at Treglonoù and Wiseni .
- 1997 : Founding of a Lycee Lise Diwan at Karaez in central Brittany
- September 2006 : Schools formed at Louaneg and ar Chapel-Nevez.
- October 2007 : Opening of Diwan school in Kastellin
- September 2008 : Opening of first "secondary school" in "Loire Atlantique fr. Liger-Atlantel (at Sant-Ervlan) and schools at Lokournan and Magoer, near to Roazhon. (Rennes fr.)
- September 2009 : Opening of two Diwan schools in Rianteg in Bro-Wened (Historical region around Vannes with its own distinct Breton dialect and at Savenneg e Bro-Naoned. (Pays de Nantes)
