= Jardin exotique de Ponteilla =

Botanical garden in Languedoc-Roussillon, France

Coordinates: 42°37′22″N 2°49′16″E

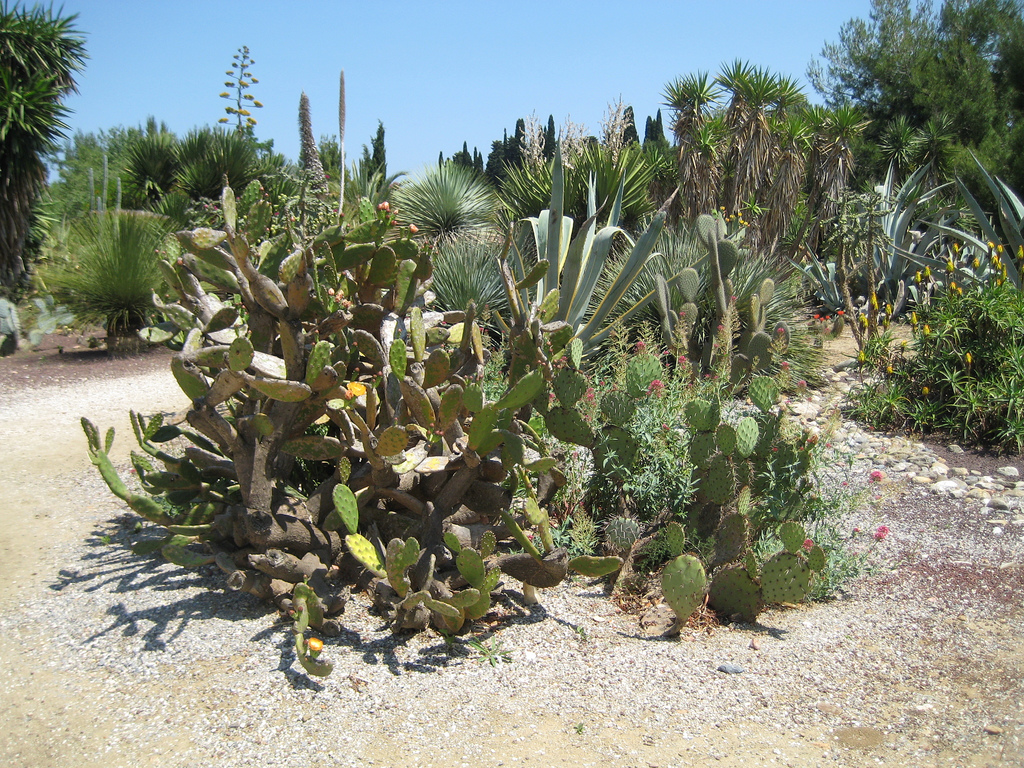
Cacti growing in the Jardin exotique de Ponteilla

The Jardin exotique de Ponteilla (3 hectares) is a botanical garden located on the Route de Nyls, Ponteilla, Pyrénées-Orientales, Languedoc-Roussillon, France. It is open in the warmer months; an admission fee is charged.

The garden was created in 1991 on a former vineyard, and opened to the public in 1994. Today it contains more than 1,800 varieties of plants from around the world, including cactus, bamboo, palm trees, eucalyptus, and carnivorous plants.

== See also ==
- List of botanical gardens in France
