= Gascon dialect =

Occitano-Romance variety spoken in France and Spain

Gascon
- gascon
- Pronunciation: [ɡasˈku(ŋ)]
- Native to: France; Spain
- Region: Gascony
- Language family: Indo-European: Italic; Latino-Faliscan; Latin; Romance; Italo-Western; Western Romance; Gallo-Romance; Occitano-Romance; Occitan; Gascon
- Dialects: see below

Official status
- Official language in: Spain: Catalonia (as Aranese)
- Recognised minority language in: France: Nouvelle-Aquitaine; Occitania

Language codes
- ISO 639-3: gsc retired and subsumed into oci
- Glottolog: gasc1240
- ELP: Gascon
- IETF: oc-gascon
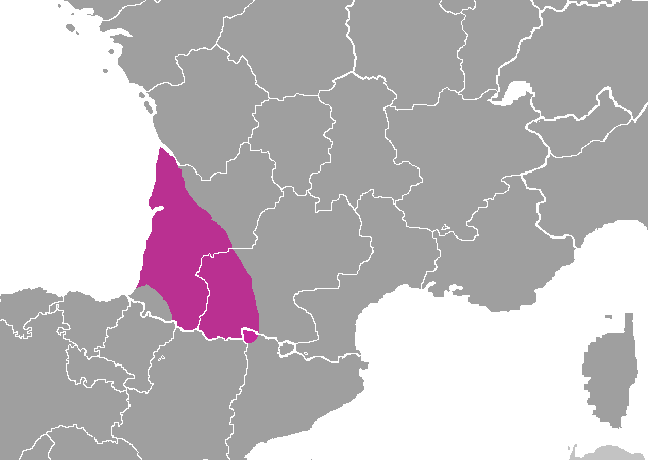
- Gascon speaking area

- Gascon is classified as Definitely Endangered by the UNESCO Atlas of the World's Languages in Danger (2010).

Gascon (English: /ˈɡæskən/ GASK-ən, Gascon: [ɡasˈku(ŋ)], French: [ɡaskɔ̃]) is the vernacular Romance variety spoken mainly in the region of Gascony, France. It is often considered a variety of larger Occitan macrolanguage, although other authors consider it a separate language due to hindered mutual intelligibility criteria and earlier separation from the other Occitano-Romance varieties.

Gascon is mostly spoken in Gascony and Béarn (Béarnese dialect) in southwestern France (in parts of the following French départements: Pyrénées-Atlantiques, Hautes-Pyrénées, Landes, Gers, Gironde, Lot-et-Garonne, Haute-Garonne, and Ariège) and in the Val d'Aran of Catalonia.

Aranese, a southern Gascon variety, is spoken in Catalonia alongside Catalan and Spanish. Most people in the region are trilingual in all three languages, causing some influence from Spanish and Catalan. Both these influences tend to differentiate it more and more from the dialects of Gascon spoken in France. Most linguists now consider Aranese a distinct dialect of Occitan and Gascon. Since the 2006 adoption of the new statute of Catalonia, Aranese is co-official with Catalan and Spanish in all of Catalonia (before, this status was valid for the Aran Valley only).

A Gascon speaker recorded in France

== Linguistic classification ==
While it is generally accepted that Occitan constitutes a single language, some authors reject this opinion and even the name Occitan: instead, they argue that the latter is a cover term for a family of distinct lengas d'òc rather than dialects of a single language. Gascon, in particular, is distinct enough linguistically to have been described as a language in its own right.

== Basque substrate ==
The language spoken in Gascony before Roman rule was part of the Basque dialectal continuum (see Aquitanian language); the fact that the word 'Gascon' comes from the Latin root vasco/vasconem, which is the same root that gives us 'Basque', implies that the speakers identified themselves at some point as Basque. There is a proven Basque substrate in the development of Gascon. This explains some of the major differences that exist between Gascon and Occitan dialects.

A typically Gascon feature that may arise from this substrate is the change from "f" to "h". Where a word originally began with [f] in Latin, such as festa 'party/feast', this sound was weakened to aspirated [h] and then, in some areas, lost altogether; according to the substrate theory, this is due to the Basque dialects' lack of an equivalent /f/ phoneme, causing Gascon hèsta [ˈhɛsto] or [ˈɛsto]. A similar change took place in Spanish. Thus, Latin facere gives Spanish hacer ([aˈθer]) (or, in some parts of southwestern Andalusia, [haˈsɛɾ]). Another phonological effect resulting from the Basque substrate may have been Gascon's reluctance to pronounce a /r/ at the beginning of words, resolved by means of a prothetical vowel.

Although some linguists deny the plausibility of the Basque substrate theory, it is widely assumed that Basque, the "Circumpyrenean" language (as put by Basque linguist Alfonso Irigoyen and defended by Koldo Mitxelena, 1982), is the underlying language spreading around the Pyrenees onto the banks of the Garonne River, maybe as far east as the Mediterranean in Roman times (niska cited by Joan Coromines as the name of each nymph taking care of the Roman spa Arles de Tech in Roussillon, etc.). Basque gradually eroded across Gascony in the High Middle Ages (Basques from the Val d'Aran cited still circa 1000), with vulgar Latin and Basque interacting and mingling, but eventually with the former replacing the latter north of the east and middle Pyrenees and developing into Gascon.

However, modern Basque has had lexical influence from Gascon in words like beira ("glass"), which is also seen in Galician-Portuguese. One way for the introduction of Gascon influence into Basque came about through language contact in bordering areas of the Northern Basque Country, acting as adstrate.

The énonciatif (Occitan: enunciatiu) system of Gascon, a system that is more colloquial than characteristic of normative written Gascon and governs the use of certain preverbal particles (including the sometimes emphatic affirmative que, the occasionally mitigating or dubitative e, the exclamatory be, and the even more emphatic ja/ye, and the "polite" se) has also been attributed to the Basque substrate.

== Gascon varieties ==
Gascon is divided into three varieties or sub-groups:

- Western Gascon, which includes Landese dialect and North-Gascon (bazadais, high-landese and bordelese)
- Eastern or interior Gascon, known as parlar clar (Béarnese)
- Pyrenean or southern Gascon, which includes Aranese dialect

The Jews of Gascony, who resided in Bordeaux, Bayonne and other cities, spoke until the beginning of the 20th century a sociolect of Gascon with special phonetic and lexical features, which linguistics named Judeo-Gascon. It has been superseded by a sociolect of French that retains most of the lexical features of this former variety.

Béarnais, the official language when Béarn was an independent state, does not correspond to a unified language: the three forms of Gascon are spoken in Béarn (in the south, Pyrenean Gascon, in the center and in the east, Eastern Gascon; to the north-west, Western Gascon).

	French	Landese	Béarnese and Bigourdan	Aranese	Commingeois and Couseranais	Interior Gascon	Bazadais and High-Landese	Bordelese
Affirmation: He is going	Il y va	Qu' i va.	Que i va.	I va.	Que i va.	Que i va.	(Qu’) i va/vai.	I vai.
Negation: He wasn't listening to him	Il ne l’écoutait pas	Ne l’escotèva pas	Non / ne l’escotava pas	Non la escotaua	Non l’escotava cap	Ne l’escotava pas	(Ne) l’escotèva pas	Ne l'escotava pas/briga
Plural formation: the young men – the young women	Les jeunes hommes – les jeunes filles	Los gojats – las gojatas	Eths / los gojats – eras / las gojatas	Es gojats – es gojates	Eths gojats – eras gojatas	Los gojats – las gojatas	Los gojats – las gojatas	Los gojats – las dònas/gojas

== Usage of the language ==
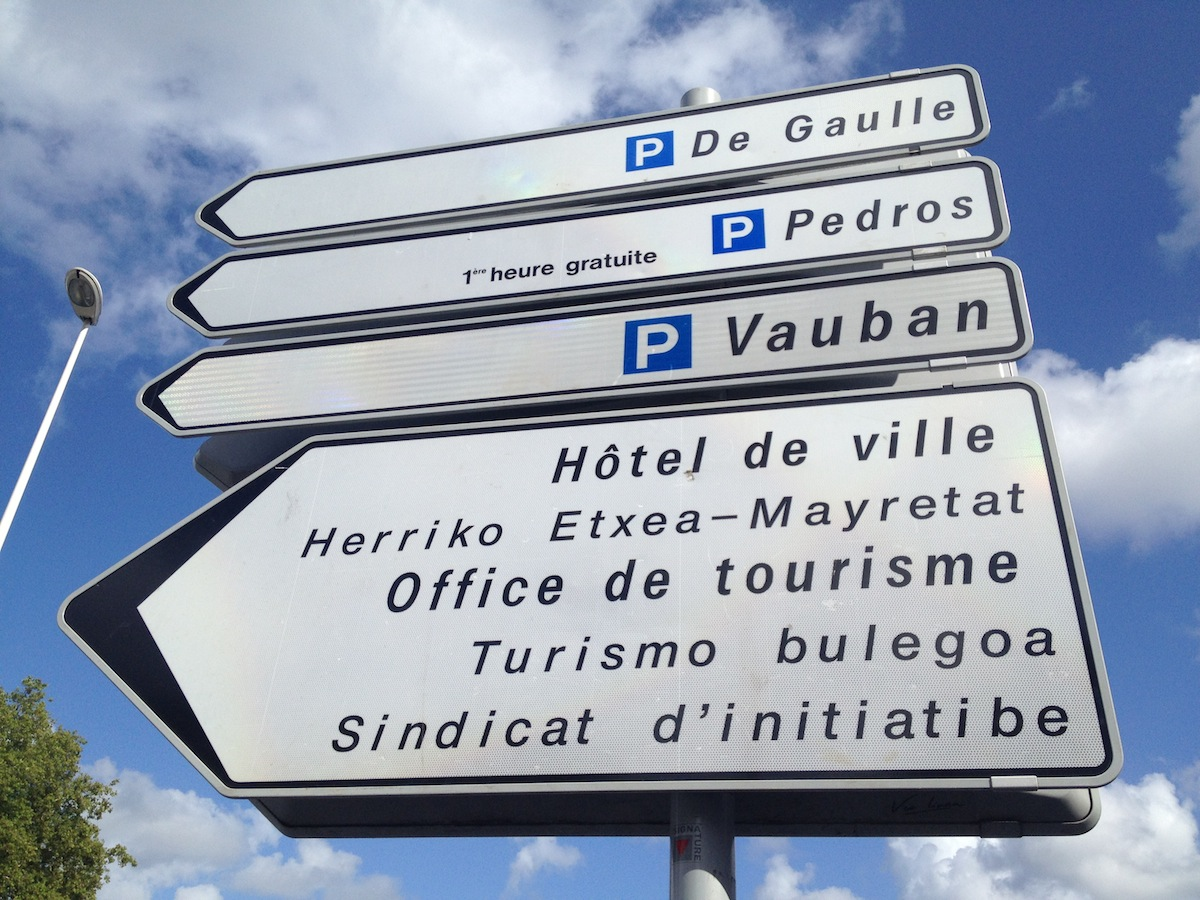
Trilingual sign in Bayonne: French, Basque, and Gascon Occitan ("Mayretat", "Sindicat d'initiatibe")

A poll conducted in Béarn in 1982 indicated that 51% of the population could speak Gascon, 70% understood it, and 85% expressed a favourable opinion regarding the protection of the language. However, use of the language has declined dramatically over recent years as a result of the Francization taking place during the last centuries, as Gascon is rarely transmitted to young generations any longer (outside of schools, such as the Calandretas).

By April 2011, the Endangered Languages Project estimated that there were only 250,000 native speakers of the language.

In fact, there is no unified Béarnais dialect, as the language differs considerably throughout the province. Many of the differences in pronunciation can be divided into east, west, and south (the mountainous regions). For example, an 'a' at the end of words is pronounced "ah" in the west, "o" in the east, and "œ" in the south. Because of Béarn's specific political past, Béarnais has been distinguished from Gascon since the 16th century, not for linguistic reasons.

== Influences on other languages ==
Probably as a consequence of the linguistic continuum of western Romania and the French influence over the Hispanic Mark on medieval times, shared similar and singular features are noticeable between Gascon and other Latin languages on the other side of the border: Aragonese and far-western Catalan (Catalan of La Franja).

Gascon is also (with Spanish, Navarro-Aragonese and French) one of the Romance influences on the Basque language.

== Examples ==
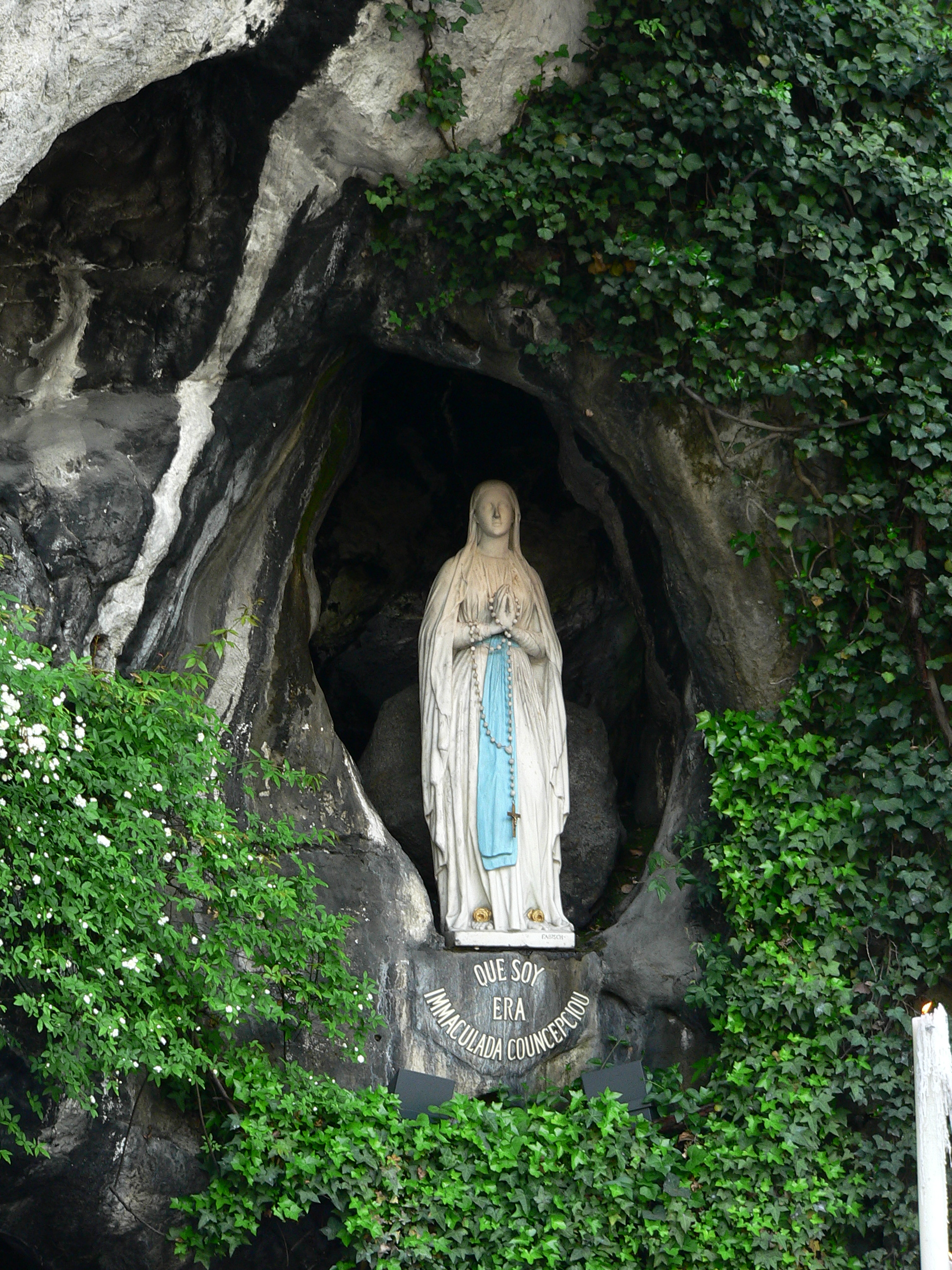
According to the testimony of Bernadette Soubirous, the Virgin Mary spoke to her (Lourdes, 25 March 1858) in Gascon saying: Que soy era Immaculada Councepciou ("I am the Immaculate Conception", the phrase being reproduced under this statue in the Lourdes grotto in Mistralian/Febusian spelling), confirming the proclamation of this Catholic dogma four years earlier.

Word	Translation	IPA
Earth	tèrra	[ˈtɛrrɔ]
heaven	cèu	[ˈsɛw]
water	aiga	[ˈajɣɔ]
fire	huec	[ˈ(h)wɛk]
man	òmi/òme	[ˈɔmi]/[ˈɔme]
woman	hemna	[ˈ(h)ennɔ]
eat	minjar/manjar	[minˈʒa]/[manˈ(d)ʒa]
drink	béver	[ˈbewe]/[ˈbeβe]
big	gran	[ˈɡran]
little	petit/pichon/pichòt	[peˈtit]/[piˈtʃu]/[piˈtʃɔt]
night	nueit	[ˈnɥejt]
day	dia/jorn	[ˈdia]/[ˈ(d)ʒur]

== See also ==
- Occitan conjugation
- Languages of France
- Béarnese dialect
- Landese dialect
- Vergonha
- Aragonese language

== Notes and references ==
=== References ===
- Darrigrand, Robert (1985). Comment écrire le gascon (in French). Denguin: Imprimerie des Gaves. ISBN 2868660061.
- Leclercq, Jean-Marc; Javaloyès, Sèrgi (2004). Le Gascon de poche (in French). Assimil. ISBN 2-7005-0345-7.
- Birabent, Jean-Pierre; Salles-Loustau, Jean (1989). Memento grammatical du gascon (in French). Reclams. ISBN 9782909160139.
