= Euskal Herriak Bere Eskola =

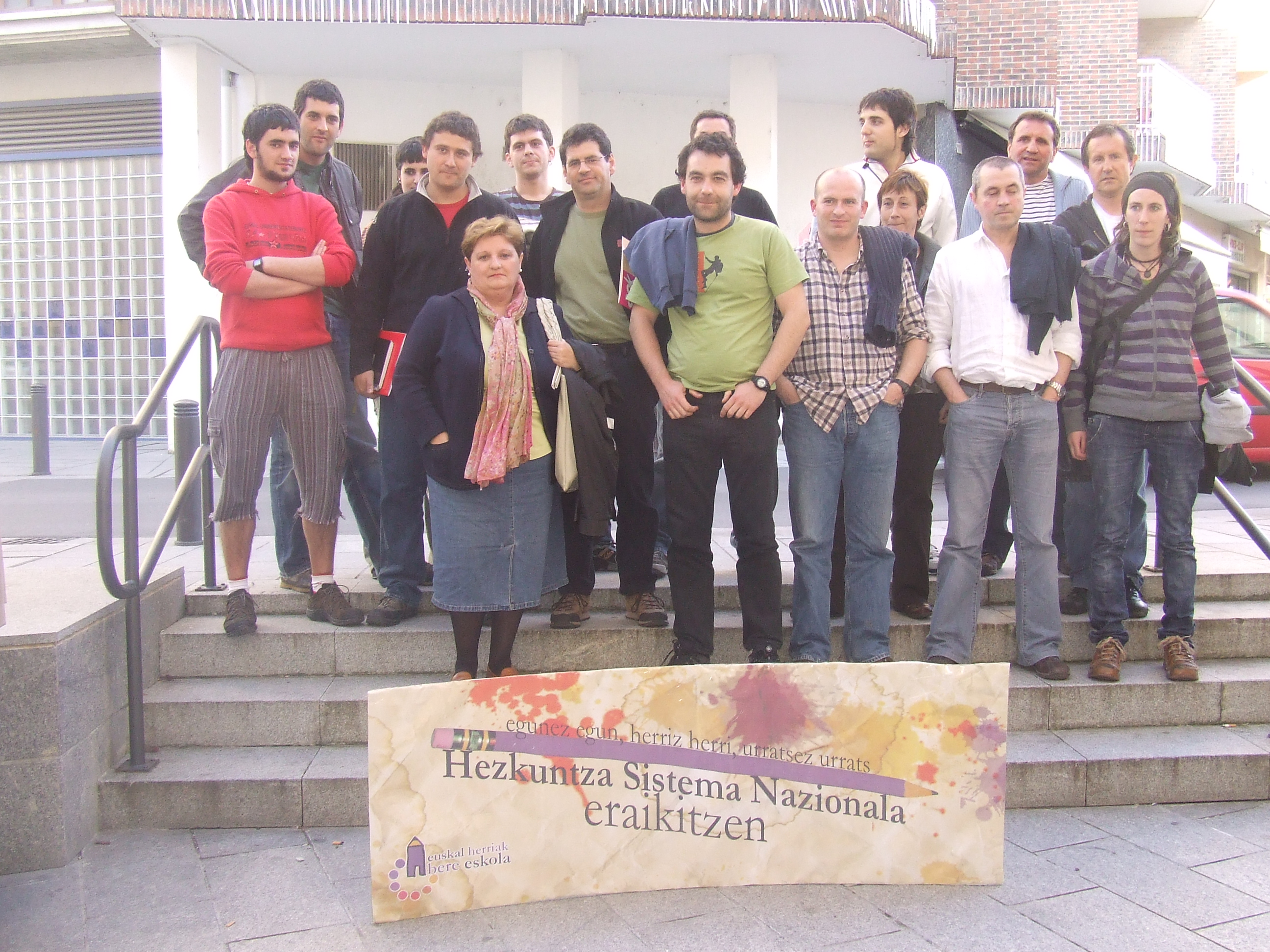
Different education-related activists on Euskal Herriak Bere Eskola's campaign.

Euskal Herriak Bere Eskola (The Basque Country its own School in Basque language) or EHBE is a Basque education organization that works for a school system based on Basque language and culture. It wants to engage with other historical Basque educational organizations, as UEU, ikastolas or student activism. It was created in 2002.

== Main campaigns ==
Since 2002 EHBE has been involved in many campaigns, specially on mobilization on different topics:

- Primary school in Basque language.
- Euskal Unibertsitatea, or Basque University.
- Euskal Curriculuma, or the development of a Basque Curricula.
- Promoting debate between different projects and sensibilities.
