= ABCM-Zweisprachigkeit =

French network of community schools

ABCM-Zweisprachigkeit (ABCM -> French acronym for Association pour le Bilinguisme en Classe dès la Maternelle, "Association for Bilingualism in the Classroom from Kindergarten onwards", Zweisprachigkeit -> German for "Bilingualism") is a network of bilingual community schools, located in the regions of Alsace, Moselle and Baden-Württemberg. The teaching is given in French and German (standard and dialectal) on a 50-50 basis.

Founded in 1990, these schools aim to revitalise regional languages that are under threat, as well as offer more opportunities for pupils thanks to the dual knowledge of French and German.

At first, teaching in these schools was done in standardised French and German, including the school located in Baden-Württemberg. Since 2004, the schools have been gradually proposing the teaching of the local dialect, Alsatian or Lorraine Franconian, depending on the school location. More and more ABCM-schools are integrating immersion classes in the local regional language.

== Situation ==
The ABCM-Zweisprachigkeit network currently represents:

- In Alsace: five schools in the Haut-Rhin département (Ingersheim, Moosch, Lutterbach, Mulhouse, Muespach) and five schools in the Bas-Rhin département (Schweighouse-sur-Moder, Haguenau, Saverne, Strasbourg, Gerstheim).
- In the Moselle French département: two schools in the city of Sarreguemines (opened in 1997).
- In Baden-Württemberg: a school in Kappel-Grafenhausen (opened in 2012). The school is just a transposition of a typical ABCM-school into Germany's territory, therefore it still follows the school teaching program of France.
