= EUNEIZ =

Private university in Vitoria-Gasteiz

Coordinates: 42.8620°N 2.6404°W

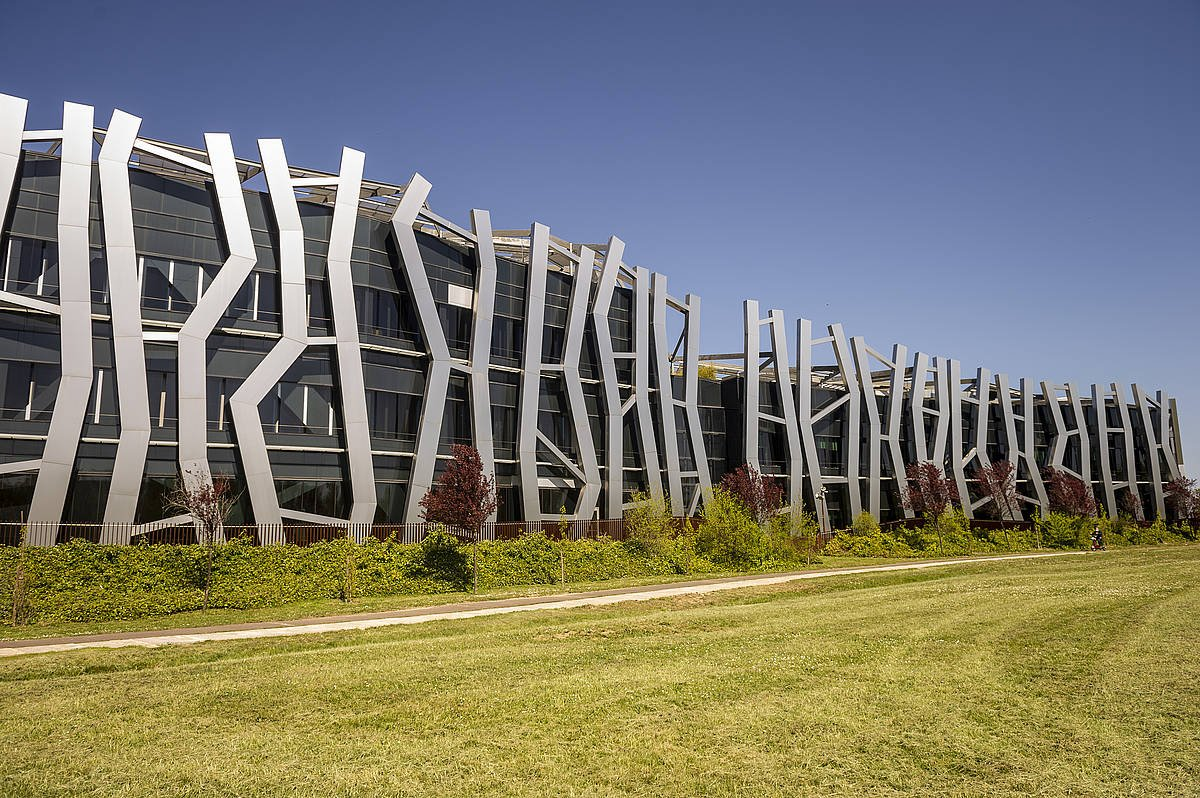
- Type: Private
- Established: September 15, 2022
- Rector: Dr. Eva Eguiguren
- Location: Vitoria-Gasteiz, Basque Country, Spain
- Affiliations: Baskonia-Alavés Group
- Website: www.euneiz.com/en/

European University Gasteiz, better known by the acronym EUNEIZ, is a private university in Vitoria-Gasteiz, Spain.

== History ==
The creation of EUNEIZ as a university specialising in new technologies and sports and health sciences was promoted by businessman José Antonio Querejeta and the Baskonia-Alavés Group. The Basque Parliament passed a law authorising the creation of EUNEIZ in 2021.

The university opened on 15 September 2022 with 110 students in its first academic year.

== Location ==
The university is located in the former headquarters of the Caja Vital savings bank, in the vicinity of Fernando Buesa Arena and the BAKH sports complex.
