= Ikastola =

Type of Basque primary and secondary school

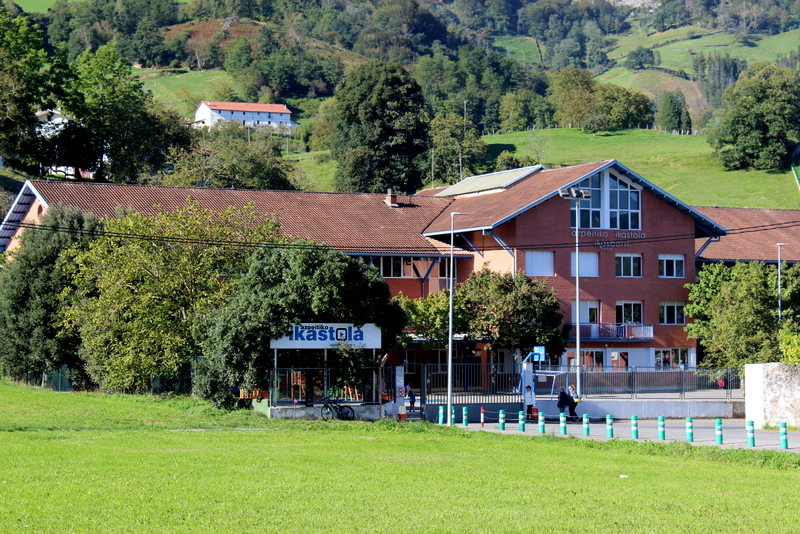
Ikastola in Azpeitia (Gipuzkoa)

An ikastola (Basque pronunciation: [ikas̺tola], plural ikastolak) is a type of primary and secondary school in the Basque Autonomous Community, Navarre and (to a much lesser extent) the French Basque Country (see Basque Country) in which pupils are taught either entirely or predominantly in the Basque language. Ikastolak can be nowadays either private or public, divided into different networks.

The Basque language public network relies on state funding and management, allocated in Spain by the education institutions of the Basque Autonomous Community and Navarre in their corresponding territories, while in France the association Ikas-Bi in the public network advocates for bilingual education. Seaska is the private network of Basque language schools in the French Basque Country, closely linked to the similar network in the Southern Basque Country. The private networks base their activity on the fees paid by parents, popular subscription (either directly or by means of annual massive festivals, e.g. Herri Urrats, Nafarroa Oinez, Araba Euskaraz, etc.) and the allowance provided by public educational institutions.

== History ==
Although spoken more widely than in later times, there was very little schooling undertaken in Basque before the early 20th century revival in Basque nationalism. Spanish and French were mandatory in schooling at either side of the border. The first official ikastola was opened in 1914, and the movement to transfer the medium of education in the Southern Basque Country from Spanish to Basque became widespread in the late 20th century.

During the early 1930s, the seeds of the "Basque Schools" (Spanish: Escuelas Vascas) were shown in Navarre by the Basque Nationalist Party, featuring an instruction where the teachings of the Christian doctrine were central. They were conceived as an attempt to counter increased laicization of state schools and the lack of focus ("the neutrality") on Basque matters in regular religious schooling. The first such educative institution was founded in November 1931 at Pamplona, followed by another one in Estella-Lizarra (1933) and Elizondo (1935).

Following the Republican defeat in the Spanish Civil War, the public use of Basque was made illegal, and all educational institutions were forced to teach entirely through the medium of Castilian, to the complete neglect and persecution of Basque. There are, however, isolated examples of ikastolak which clandestinely continued to teach in Basque.

Since thousands of children were studying out of the authorized schools and hence forbidden to progress to higher education, in 1969 the Roman Catholic Church arranged with the parent associations the lawful Diocesan Federation of Ikastolas, later becoming a secular federation. With the return of democracy following the death of Franco in 1975, large degrees of self-government were given to the Basque Autonomous Community and Navarre, and ikastolak sprang up all over the Basque region in northern Spain.

For a time, the ikastolak operated along the public school system, the private schools publicly funded under a charter and the private schools. During his term as Basque minister for education, the Socialist Fernando Buesa proposed the 1993 Law of the Basque Public School, prompting ikastolak to choose between full integration in the public system or operating under the rules for chartered private schools.

At the present time, tens of thousands of schoolchildren in the Basque Autonomous Community and Navarre attend ikastolak, but the status of ikastolak differs greatly depending on their location. They are firmly entrenched in the traditionally Basque-speaking areas of the Basque Autonomous Community (BAC), but less so in non-Basque speaking areas (i.e. the southern fringes). Basque language schools in the north of Navarre do not enjoy the same support from the regional government as they do in the BAC, but they are officially recognised and enjoy widespread local support (traditionally Basque speaking), unlike central and southern areas of Navarre, where they lack public recognition and funding, remaining in a legal limbo until 2007.

In the French Basque Country, the ikastolak developed later, but grew steadily, so much so that a network, Seaska, is now widespread throughout the whole territory covering education up to the A levels.

== See also ==
- Basque education system
- Breton language: Diwan schools
- Euskal Herriak Bere Eskola
- Irish language: Gaelscoileanna
- Welsh language: Welsh-medium education
- Scottish Gaelic: Scottish Gaelic medium education
- Catalan language: La Bressola
- Occitan language: Calandretas
- German language: Illegal Katakombenschule in Italian Tyrol.
- Greek language: Krifo scholio (κρυφό σκολειό) in Ottoman Greece
- Galician language: A galiña azul in Galicia
