= Toubon Law =

Linguistic purist law in France

Law 94-665 of 4 August 1994

French Parliament
- Long title: Law 94-665 of 4 August 1994 relating to usage of the French language
- Territorial extent: France
- Passed by: Senate
- Passed: 1 July 1994
- Passed by: National Assembly
- Passed: 30 June 1994
- Signed by: François Mitterrand
- Signed: 4 August 1994

Legislative history

Initiating chamber: Senate
- Bill citation: N° 291
- Introduced by: Jacques Toubon, Minister of Culture
- Introduced: 1 March 1994
- First reading: 14 April 1994
- Second reading: 26 May 1994

Revising chamber: National Assembly
- First reading: 4 May 1994
- Second reading: 13 June 1994

Final stages
- Reported from conference committee: 23 June 1994
- Conference committee bill passed by Senate: 1 July 1994
- Conference committee bill passed by National Assembly: 30 June 1994

Constitutional Council cases
- Decision 94-345 DC of 29 July 1994

Keywords
- Language policy in France

Text of statute as originally enacted

Revised text of statute as amended
- Status: Amended

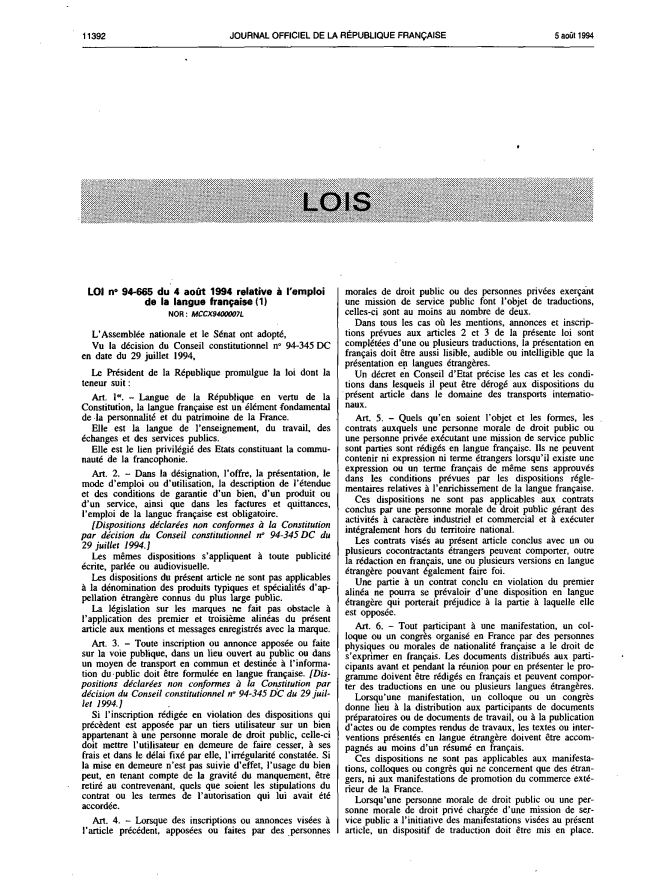
The Law as published in the Journal Officiel de la République Française

The Toubon Law (full name: law 94-665 of 4 August 1994 relating to usage of the French language) is a French law mandating the use of the French language in official government publications, in all advertisements, in all workplaces, in commercial contracts, in some other commercial communication contexts, in all government-financed schools, and some other contexts.

The law does not concern private, non-commercial communications, such as non-commercial web publications by private bodies. It does not concern books, films, public speeches, and other forms of communications not constituting commercial activity. However, the law mandates the use of the French language in all broadcast audiovisual programs, with exceptions for musical works and "original version" films. Broadcast musical works are subject to quota rules under a related law whereby a minimum percentage of television shows and 35% of songs on the radio must be in the French language.

The law takes its common name from Jacques Toubon, who was Minister of Culture when it was passed, and who proposed the law to the National Assembly of France. A nickname is Loi Allgood – "Allgood" is a morpheme-for-morpheme translation of "Toubon" into English ("All Good" being a translation of "Tout bon") – as the law can largely be considered to have been enacted in reaction to the increasing usage of English in advertisements and other areas in France. As the law sought to strengthen French as the dominant language within the country and its territories, the law also 'came under considerable attack from the European Commission which regarded its provisions as particularly offensive to the concept of free competition across national borders.'

== Provisions of the law ==
One broad provision of the law applying to workplaces is that "any document that contains obligations for the employee or provisions whose knowledge is necessary for the performance of one's work must be written in French." Among other things, this means that computer software developed outside France must have its user interface and instruction manuals translated into French to be legally used by companies in France. The law includes an exception that "these provisions do not apply to documents coming from abroad", but this exception has been interpreted narrowly by the appellate courts. For example, in 2006 a French subsidiary of a US company was given a hefty fine for delivering certain highly technical documents and software interfaces to its employees in the English language only, and this was upheld by the appellate court.

Another broad provision of the law is that it makes it mandatory for commercial advertisements and public announcements to be given in French. This does not rule out advertisements made in a foreign language: it is sufficient to provide a translation in a footnote. This was justified as a measure for the protection of the consumer. Additionally, product packaging must be in French, though, again, translation in multiple languages can be provided.

A similar restriction—though implemented by primary legislation regulations and not as application of the Loi Toubon—applies to product labeling: product labels should be intelligible and in French, though additional languages may be present. Some linguistic restrictions on product labeling were found to be incompatible with European law, particularly the directives concerning the freedom of movement of goods within the European Union. The French government then issued interpretation notes and amended regulations in order to comply.

In another provision, the law specifies obligations for public legal persons (government administrations, et al.), mandating the use of French in publications, or at least in summaries of publications. In France, it is a constitutional requirement that the public should be informed of the action of the government. Since the official language of France is French, it follows that the French public should be able to get official information in French.

Under the Toubon law, schools that do not use French as the medium of instruction are ineligible for government funding. This excludes the Breton language schools of Brittany.

Other restrictions concern the use of French in academic conferences. These are largely ignored by many public institutions, especially in the "hard" scientific fields. The original restrictions on colloquia also applied to private bodies, but that was found unconstitutional prior to enactment, on grounds that they violated freedom of speech, and the final form of the law was modified accordingly.

=== Enforcement against French subsidiaries of US-based organizations ===
In the mid-1990s, soon after the Toubon Law came into force, two French lobbying groups—the Association pour la Défense de la Langue Française and the L'Avenir de la Langue Française—filed a complaint against Georgia Tech Lorraine, the Metz campus of the Georgia Institute of Technology. At the time of the complaint, all classes at this Lorraine school were conducted in English, and all course descriptions on its French Internet web site were in English only. The complaint invoked the Toubon Law to demand that the school's web site must be in French because the web site was effectively a commercial advertisement for the school's courses. Although the case was dismissed by the court on a minor legal technicality, and the lobbying groups chose to drop the matter, the school was moved to offer its French website in the French language in addition to English, although classes continued to be in English only.

In 2006, the French subsidiary of the US company General Electric Medical Systems was fined €500,000 plus an ongoing fine of €20,000 per day for not complying with the Toubon law.

== Response ==
In response to the law, the British Member of Parliament for South Hams, Anthony Steen introduced a Ten Minute Rule bill in Parliament that would ban French words being used in the United Kingdom.

== See also ==
- Language policy in France
- Ordinance of Villers-Cotterêts
- Académie française
- Charter of the French Language, Quebec
- Office québécois de la langue française
