= Ponteilla =

Ponteilla Pontellà
- Commune
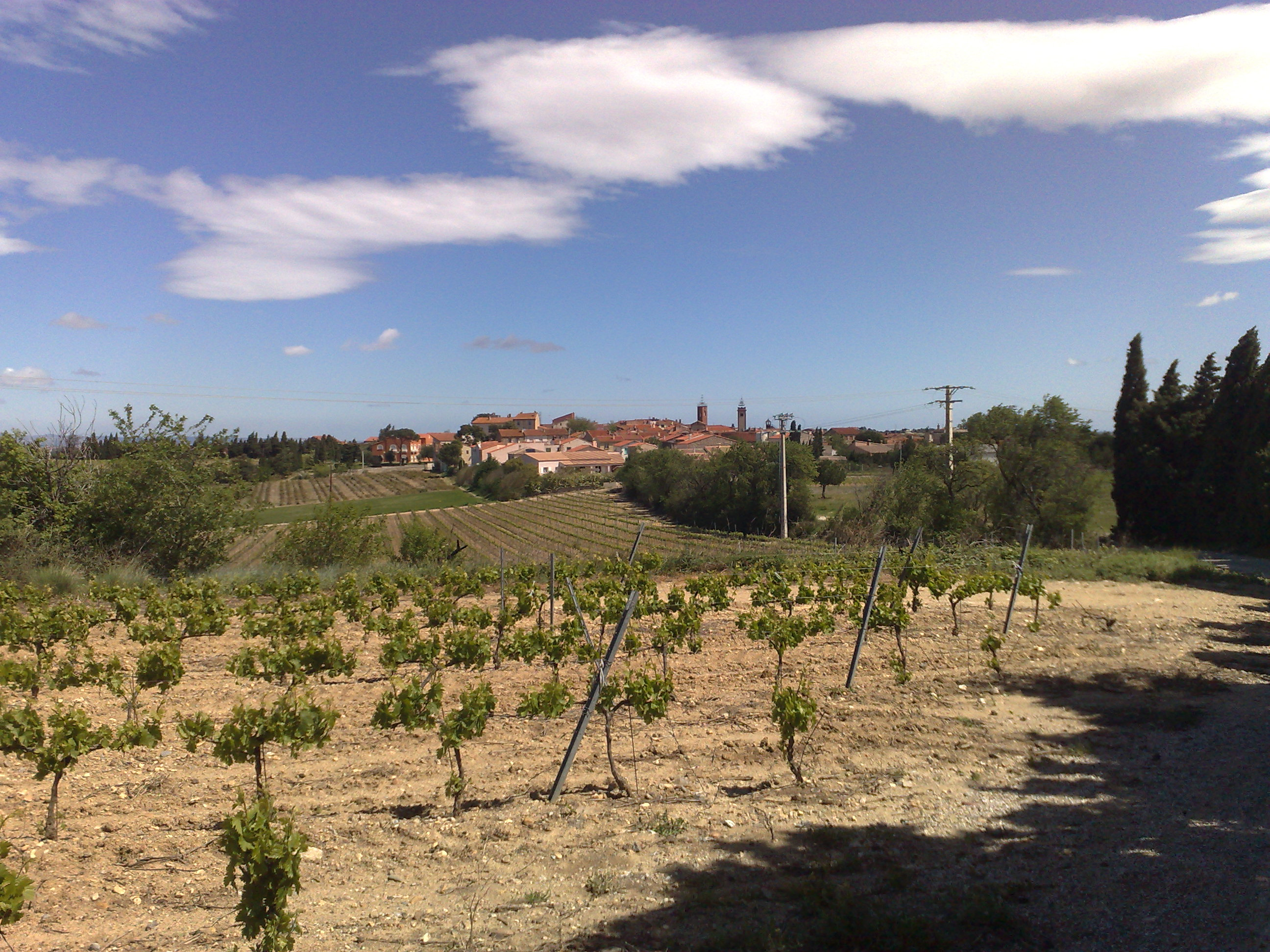
- Vineyards and the village of Ponteilla

- Coat of arms
- Location of Ponteilla
- Location within France Location within Occitanie
- Coordinates: 42°37′38″N 2°48′55″E
- Country: France
- Region: Occitania
- Department: Pyrénées-Orientales
- Arrondissement: Perpignan
- Canton: Les Aspres
- Intercommunality: Perpignan Méditerranée Métropole

Government
  - Mayor (2020–2026): Franck Dadies
- Area^{1}: 13.78 km^{2} (5.32 sq mi)
- Elevation: 115 m (377 ft)
- Highest elevation: 153 m (502 ft)
- Lowest elevation: 52 m (171 ft)
- Population (2023): 3,101
  - Density: 225.0/km^{2} (582.8/sq mi)
- Time zone: UTC+01:00 (CET)
  - Summer (DST): UTC+02:00 (CEST)
- INSEE/Postal code: 66145 /66300
- ^{1} French Land Register data, which excludes lakes, ponds, glaciers > 1 km^{2} (0.386 sq mi or 247 acres) and river estuaries.

Ponteilla (French pronunciation: [pɔ̃tɛja]; Catalan: Pontellà) is a commune in the Pyrénées-Orientales department in southern France.

== Geography ==
Ponteilla is located in the canton of Les Aspres and in the arrondissement of Perpignan.

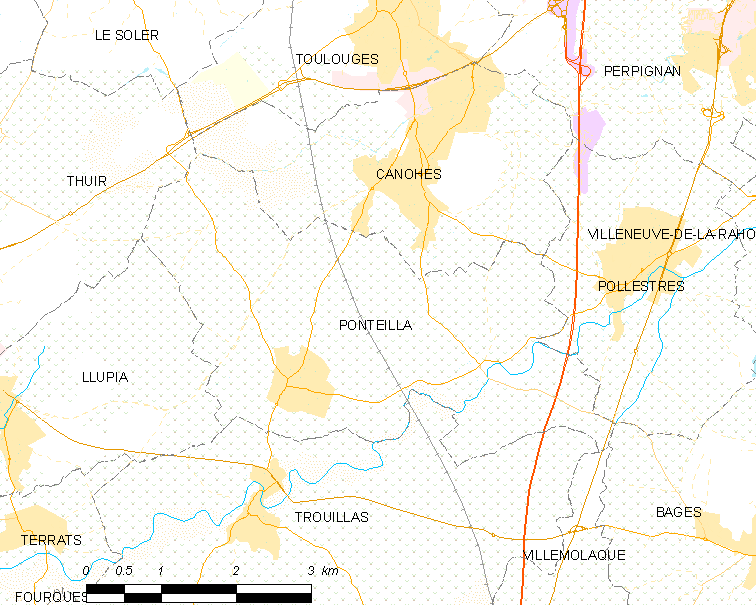
Map of Ponteilla and its surrounding communes

== Population ==
Historical population
Year	Pop.	±% p.a.
1968	1,107	—
1975	1,082	−0.33%
1982	1,182	+1.27%
1990	1,521	+3.20%
1999	1,827	+2.06%
2007	2,642	+4.72%
2012	2,798	+1.15%
2017	2,738	−0.43%
2023	3,101	+2.10%
Source: INSEE

== Sites of interest ==
- Jardin exotique de Ponteilla

== See also ==
- Communes of the Pyrénées-Orientales department
