= Landais dialect =

Dialect of the Gascon language

- Maritime Gascon
- parlar negue
- Pronunciation: [parˈla ˈnøɣə]
- Region: West of Landes, part of Chalosse, Bayonne
- Ethnicity: Gascons
- Language family: Indo-European: Italic; Latino-Faliscan; Romance; Italo-Western; Western; Gallo-Romance; Occitano-Romance; Occitan; Gascon; Landais dialect
- Dialects: gascon de Bayonne
- Writing system: Occitan alphabet

Language codes
- ISO 639-3: –

Landais (Maritime Gascon, or parlar negre, which means "black speech" in English) is a dialect of the Gascon language, spoken in the south-west part of Landes of Gascony, part of Chalosse and around Bayonne (Aquitaine, metropolitan France). Landais is an endangered dialect as are several other Occitan languages.

== Reorganization of vowel phonemes ==
The main feature of Landais is its propensity to pronounce ⟨e⟩ as /ø/ instead of /e/, and both final ⟨-e⟩ and ⟨-a⟩ as /ə/. Thus there is a migration of phonemes from the general Gascon to new phonemes in Landais.

== Works ==
The poet, novelist and essayist Bernat Manciet (1923 - 2005) remained faithful to the local Gascon speaking of his native Landes region where he lived a large part of his life.

The erudite Vincent Foix (1857 - 1932) has written a dictionary on the Gascon from Chalosse and other parts of Landes.

== Sources ==
Part of content in this edit is based on a partial translation from the existing French Wikipedia article at fr:Parlar negre (see its history for attribution) which cites the following sources:

- Philippe Lartigue, Le vocalisme du gascon maritime, D.E.A. de Sciences du Langage, University of Toulouse-Le Mirail, June 2004
- Pierre Moureau, Dictionnaire du patois de La Teste, 1870; 2nd edition: Dictionnaire gascon-français, français-gascon: suivant les parlers maritimes, Princi Negre, 1997, ISBN 2-905007-37-0
- Pierre Rectoran, Le gascon maritime de Bayonne et du Bas-Adour, Jean Curutchet, 1996, ISBN 2-904348-60-3

== See also ==
- Béarnese dialect
- Gascony
