= Calandreta =

Bilingual school teaching both Occitan and French

A Calandreta (Occitan pronunciation: [kalanˈdɾɛtɔ]) is a bilingual school in Southern France where the Occitan language is a medium of instruction, alongside French. These schools are based on the same principle as the Diwan schools of Brittany, as well as the Gaelscoileanna movement in Ireland, Ikastolak in the Basque Country, Ysgolion Meithrin in Wales, and La Bressola of Northern Catalonia.

The first Calandreta appeared in 1979 in Pau, Pyrénées-Atlantiques. A total of 62 such primary schools existed as of 2016, as well as four high schools, teaching 3,614 students in total across 18 départements of France. The Calandretas are privately run, secular and free of charge. They follow a program approved by the Ministry of National Education.

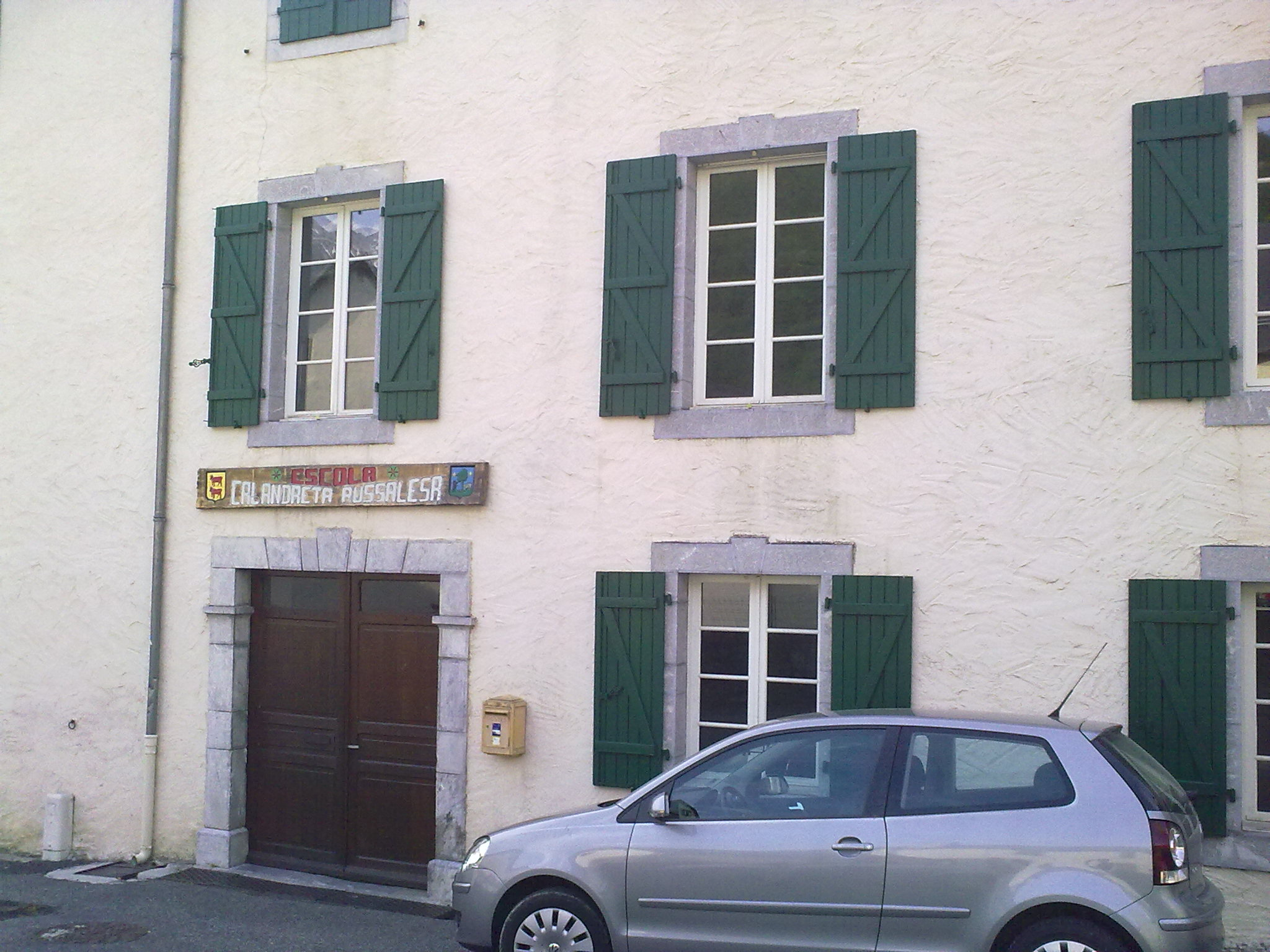
Calandreta in Béost. The sign reads: "Escola Calandreta Pussalesa"
