= Mudiad Meithrin =

Welsh-medium education charity

Mudiad Meithrin (Welsh for 'nursery movement'), formerly Mudiad Ysgolion Meithrin ('nursery schools movement') is a voluntary movement specialising in the provision of Welsh-medium early years education, including nursery groups. It aims to give every young child in Wales the opportunity to benefit from early years services and experiences through the medium of Welsh. These voluntary groups are often crucial in the subsequent establishment of a Welsh-medium primary school in the area. The movement is particularly active in anglicised areas of Wales and has grown considerably since the 1970s. In 2011, the organisation's 40th birthday, it was renamed Mudiad Meithrin.

== History ==
Formed in 1971 with the aims of developing Welsh medium nursery education. Mudiad Ysgolion Meithrin followed the establishment of voluntary nurseries in Cardiff and Carmarthen in 1943, and in Barry in 1951. However Welsh Medium nurseries were very rare before MYM's foundation in the 1970s. By 1996 over 650 groups were active and by 2000 there were over 14,000 children in the various types of nursery. The expansion of state-supported Nursery Education in recent years has led to further growth. In 2011, as part of the Mudiad's 40th celebration, the name Mudiad Ysgolion Meithrin was changed to Mudiad Meithrin ('nursery movement').

In 2005 the organisation moved from their Cardiff headquarters, to Boulevard St Brieuc in Aberystwyth. Their purpose built headquarters provided 100 childcare spaces, and provided training for teachers, parents, and childcare providers.

== Provision ==
Mudiad Meithrin has provision throughout Wales at several levels and is in partnership with local and national government.

- cylchoedd meithrin = nursery groups
- cylchoedd Ti a Fi ('you and me groups') = parent and toddler groups (the parents are often learning Welsh at the same sessions)
- day nurseries
- integrated centres.
