= Welsh-medium education =

Education delivered in the Welsh language

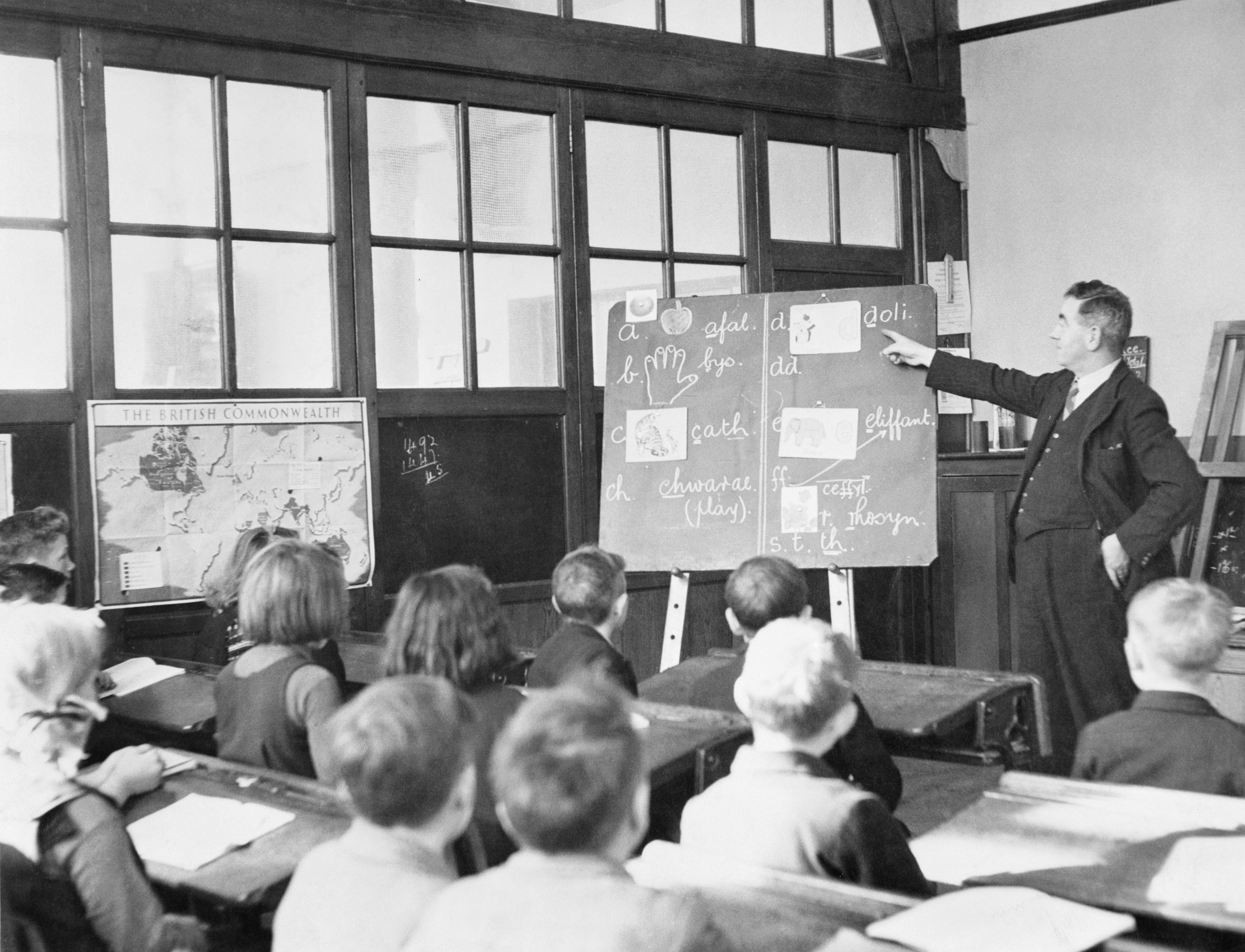
Evacuees from London in a schoolroom in Wales during World War II. The teacher is giving instruction in some useful Welsh words.

Welsh-medium education (Welsh: Addysg cyfrwng Cymraeg) is a form of education in Wales in which pupils are taught primarily through the medium of Welsh.

The aim of Welsh-medium education is to achieve fluency in both Welsh and English. All children over the age of seven receive some of their instruction in English. In January 2025, there were 93,377 pupils (21%) being educated in Welsh medium schools, and 23,807 pupils (5%) in dual language schools (Welsh and English). In addition in January 2025, there were 405 Welsh medium schools, and 66 dual language schools.

There is mixed evidence that children in Welsh-medium education tend to perform worse academically than others, Other data shows that English-medium schools outperform Welsh-medium schools at GCSE maths and English A*-C and at Level 2 inclusive. One study suggests students who leave school with Welsh proficiency go on to earn more on average than their monolingual peers in Wales. This could as a result of a broader range of opportunities within Wales, including government positions.A smaller proportion of people in higher levels of education study partially or fully through the medium of Welsh.

Formal Welsh-medium education began in Wales in 1939, and the first Welsh-medium secondary education began in 1962. In the following decades the provision was greatly expanded. The Welsh Government target is for 30% of pupils to be taught in this manner by 2031 and 40% by 2050.

In May 2025, The Welsh Language and Education (Wales) Bill was passed, with the bill outlining how the Welsh Government will go about creating one million Welsh speakers, school categorisation, and the level of standards expected from all pupils by the end of school-leaving age.

== Background ==
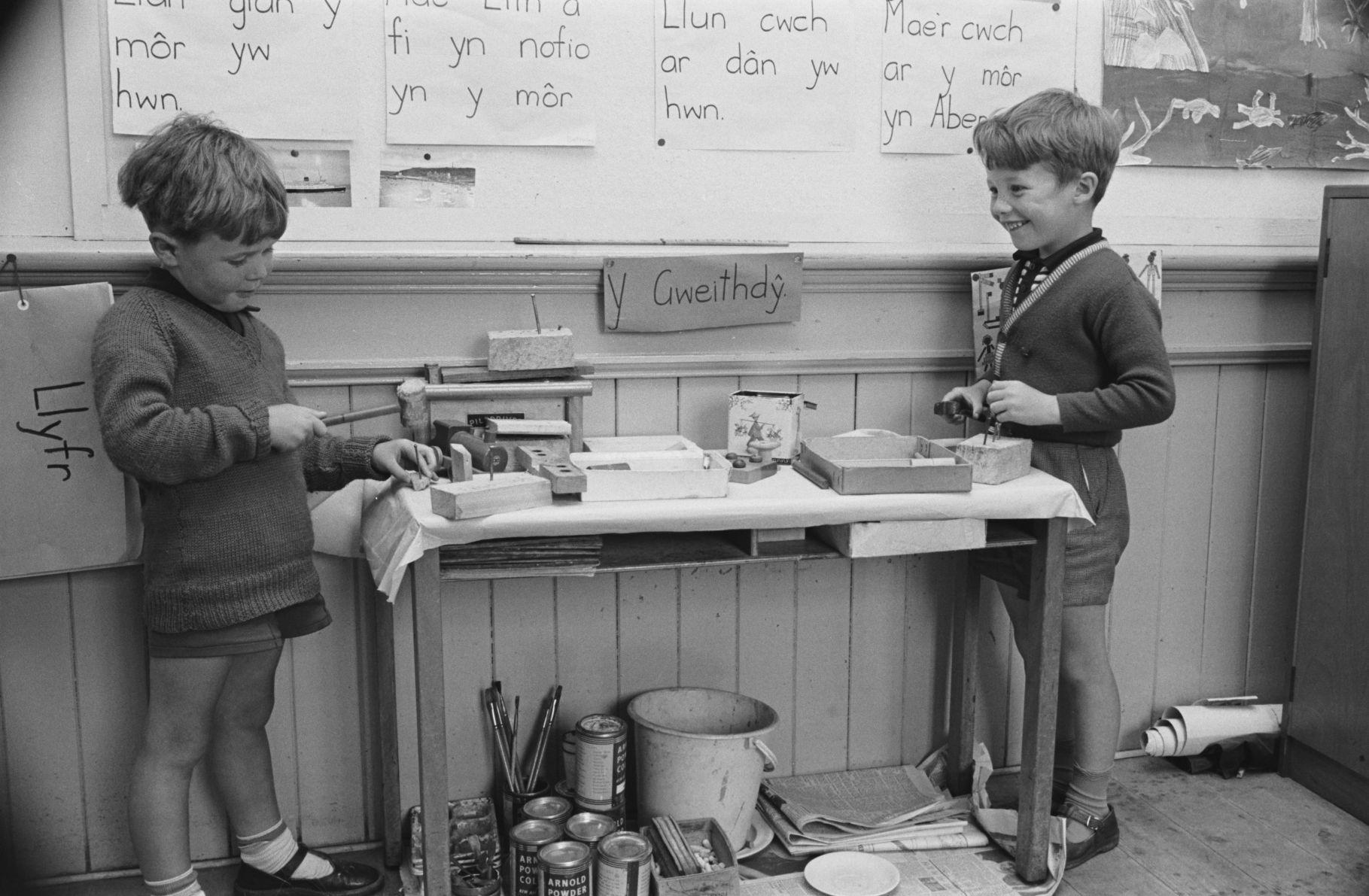
Children in a classroom with items labeled in Welsh in 1966

In the early 19th century, English became the usual language of instruction at schools in Wales. While the country's working class was largely Welsh-speaking at the time, Welsh public opinion wished for children to learn English. Many schools used corporal punishment to stop children from speaking Welsh in the first half of the 19th century; the practice declined in the second half of the century. The British government never prohibited the use of Welsh at schools but it treated English as the assumed language of instruction. More Welsh was gradually used at schools in Welsh-speaking areas in the mid to late 19th century and teaching of the language began to receive moderate government support from the late 19th century.

In 1939, the first Welsh-medium primary school was established independently of the state by the Urdd in Aberystwyth. Ysgol Glan Clwyd was the first designated bilingual secondary school in Wales, which opened in 1956. Ysgol Gyfun Rhydfelen (now Ysgol Garth Olwg) became the first Welsh-medium secondary school in South Wales in 1962.

The Welsh Government's current target is to increase the proportion of each school year group receiving Welsh-medium education to 30% by 2031, and then 40% by 2050. During a Senedd debate in December 2022, Plaid Cymru suggested Welsh-medium education be made compulsory to all students in Wales as part of the bill. It was rejected by the Welsh Government. In March 2023, the Welsh government introduced a white paper for a new Welsh Language Education Bill which would make various changes to Welsh language policy including improving teaching of Welsh in English-medium schools and requiring local authorities to promote Welsh-medium education.

Former headteacher and academic Huw Thomas wrote in 2013 that "It is generally acknowledged that the Ysgolion Cymraeg (Welsh-medium schools) have flourished in south-east Wales both in numbers and achievements".

== Nursery education ==
Mudiad Meithrin (Nursery Movement), formerly Mudiad Ysgolion Meithrin (Nursery Schools Movement) has established playgroups and nurseries throughout Wales which allow children to learn Welsh through immersion. It is the main Welsh-medium education and care provider in Wales for the early years. There were 12,773 children in cylchoedd meithrin (Mudiad Meithrin playgroups) and day nurseries in 2018–2019.

Na Naíscoileanna Gaelacha (Irish Infant Schools Organisation) was established in 1974 with continued input from Cylchoedd Meithrin. Alongside Ikastola in the Basque Autonomous Community, the Welsh Meithrin inspired the Diwan movement in Brittany.

== Schools ==
A Welsh Government video about Treorchy Comprehensive an English medium school which had seen an improvement in its results after introducing bilingual education for higher ability students. (2012)

A significant minority of schoolchildren in Wales are educated largely through the medium of Welsh: in 2014–2015, 15.7% of children and young people received Welsh-medium education – a drop from the 15.9% in 2010–2011. An additional 10% attended "bilingual, dual-medium [with Welsh and English speaking departments], or English with significant Welsh provision" schools.

Educational institutions have flexibility over how much English children are taught prior to the age of seven. This is in order to allow Welsh-medium schools and nurseries to immerse young children in the language as much as possible. In the later years of primary school, the curriculum at Welsh-medium schools continues to be mostly (70% or more) taught in Welsh whilst at secondary level all subjects other than English are taught in Welsh. There are also various categories of primary and secondary level bilingual-schools. These have greater use of English and less use of Welsh in lessons. As they get older, students in Welsh-medium education are required to work towards the same tests and qualifications in the English language as their counterparts who were primarily educated in English.

Studies suggest that parents choose Welsh-medium education as an expression of cultural identity and due to believing it will provide an economic advantage to their children. A 1998 study suggested that the language medium of a secondary school had little effect on its GCSE performance. There is other evidence that Welsh-medium schools tend to have poorer academic results than their English-medium counterparts and struggle to accommodate children with learning difficulties. The Welsh school inspectorate's (Estyn) view expressed in a 2022 book about its history is that Welsh-medium education allows more children to become fluent in both Welsh and English.

=== Primary school ===
Welsh Government statistics show that in 2019, 22.8% of 7-year-old learners were assessed through the medium of Welsh (first language).

The following chart gives the proportion of primary school pupils receiving Welsh-medium education each year.

Number of pupils in primary school classes by Welsh category (Pupil Level Annual School Census)
School year	Total pupils	Welsh-medium (main)		Welsh-medium (minor)	
School year	Total pupils	Number of pupils	% of total	Number of pupils	% of total
2024–2025	252,025	57,815	22.94%	3,390	1.35%
2023–2024	257,591	57,820	22.45%	4,100	1.59%
2022–2023	262,666	59,010	22.47%	4,075	1.55%
2021–2022	266,574	59,305	22.25%	3,480	1.31%
2020–2021	272,339	60,770	22.31%	3,760	1.38%
2019–2020	271,323	60,555	22.32%	3,735	1.38%
2018–2019	274,799	61,260	22.29%	3,485	1.27%
2017–2018	277,095	61,665	22.25%	4,160	1.50%
2016–2017	276,940	61,390	22.17%	4,370	1.58%
2015–2016	276,954	60,725	21.93%	4,700	1.70%
2014–2015	273,400	60,615	22.17%	4,335	1.59%
2013–2014	269,421	58,985	21.89%	3,510	1.30%
2012–2013	264,186	57,430	21.74%	3,705	1.40%
2011–2012	262,144	56,785	21.66%	3,120	1.19%
2010–2011	259,189	55,235	21.31%	2,915	1.12%
2009–2010	257,445	54,120	21.02%	3,110	1.21%
2008–2009	258,314	53,480	20.70%	4,475	1.73%
2007–2008	261,607	53,820	20.57%	3,185	1.22%
2006–2007	263,261	53,340	20.26%	845	0.32%
2005–2006	265,724	53,235	20.03%	1,075	0.40%
2004–2005	270,311	52,855	19.55%	1,685	0.62%
2003–2004	273,961	52,065	19.00%	2,360	0.86%

=== Middle school ===
The following chart gives the proportion of middle school students receiving Welsh-medium education each year.

Number of pupils in middle school classes by Welsh category (Pupil Level Annual School Census)
School year	Total pupils	Welsh-medium (main)		Welsh-medium (minor)	
School year	Total pupils	Number of pupils	% of total	Number of pupils	% of total
2024–2025	29,725	9,960	33.51%	1,075	3.62%
2023–2024	28,959	10,070	34.77%	655	2.26%
2022–2023	26,168	9,720	37.14%	1,100	4.20%
2021–2022	22,516	8,185	36.35%	535	2.38%
2020–2021	22,308	7,905	35.44%	685	3.07%
2019–2020	20,746	7,350	35.43%	580	2.80%
2018–2019	17,661	5,245	29.70%	850	4.81%
2017–2018	12,153	5,045	41.51%	715	5.88%
2016–2017	9,163	3,025	33.01%	480	5.24%
2015–2016	5,371	2,225	41.43%	520	9.68%
2014–2015	4,376	1,360	31.08%	575	13.14%
2013–2014	3,542	870	24.56%	365	10.30%
2012–2013	3,648	765	20.97%	220	6.03%

=== Secondary school ===
Welsh Government statistics show that in 2019, 18.5% of 14-year-old pupils were assessed in Welsh (first language).

The following chart gives the proportion of secondary school students receiving Welsh-medium education each year.

Number of pupils in secondary school classes by Welsh category (Pupil Level Annual School Census)
School year	Total pupils	Welsh-medium (main)		Welsh-medium (minor)	
School year	Total pupils	Number of pupils	% of total	Number of pupils	% of total
2024–2025	161,815	21,910	13.54%	7,475	4.62%
2023–2024	172,818	22,215	12.85%	6,005	3.47%
2022–2023	174,948	23,155	13.24%	4,325	2.47%
2021–2022	175,957	23,225	13.20%	5,985	3.40%
2020–2021	174,133	22,715	13.04%	5,905	3.39%
2019–2020	171,271	22,065	12.88%	7,780	4.54%
2018–2019	170,277	22,990	13.50%	7,165	4.21%
2017–2018	172,218	22,440	13.03%	7,570	4.40%
2016–2017	174,812	22,045	12.61%	6,820	3.90%
2015–2016	178,669	22,460	12.57%	8,800	4.93%
2014–2015	182,408	22,670	12.43%	7,065	3.87%
2013–2014	186,427	24,805	13.31%	4,980	2.67%
2012–2013	191,279	24,330	12.72%	5,595	2.93%
2011–2012	198,015	24,115	12.18%	6,995	3.53%
2010–2011	201,230	23,410	11.63%	7,530	3.74%
2009–2010	203,907	24,010	11.77%	7,380	3.62%
2008–2009	205,421	23,210	11.30%	6,950	3.38%
2007–2008	206,936	22,935	11.08%	7,330	3.54%
2006–2007	210,353	24,320	11.56%	2,935	1.40%
2005–2006	213,045	24,500	11.50%	2,595	1.22%
2004–2005	214,626	24,245	11.30%	2,090	0.97%
2003–2004	215,609	26,290	12.19%	2,265	1.05%

== Further education ==
During 2015–2016, 7.8% of learning activities in the Further Education sector included some element of Welsh, with 0.29% of activities offered through Welsh only. The subjects with the highest number of learning activities with some element of Welsh were Retail and Commercial Enterprise (18.1%); Agriculture, Horticulture and Animal Care (17.7%) and Business, Administration and Law (14.2%).

== Higher education ==
In 2014–2015, the number of higher education students with at least some learning through the medium of Welsh reached an all-time high with 6,355 students, or 5.1% of all students at Welsh universities. Of these 6,355 students, 53% were taught entirely through the medium of Welsh and 47% were taught part of their course in Welsh. By 2020–2021, the number of students at Higher Education Institutions with some learning through Welsh was 6,940, equating to 5% of all enrolments at Higher Education Institutions in Wales.

In 2020–2021, the University of Wales, Trinity Saint David had both the highest number of students (3,510) and the highest proportion of its students (24%) receiving at least some teaching through the medium of Welsh. Glyndŵr University and the University of South Wales had the lowest proportion of its students (0%) receiving at least some teaching through the medium of Welsh.

Enrolments at Bangor University and the University of Wales, Trinity Saint David accounted for over two thirds (69%) of all enrolments with at least some teaching through the medium of Welsh.

10,345 university students in Wales were fluent Welsh speakers in 2020–2021, with a further 10,485 speakers recording themselves as Welsh speakers but not fluent. Of all universities in Wales, Cardiff University had the highest number of fluent Welsh-speaking students, amounting to 1,670 students. According to the latest data collected in 2020–2021, Bangor University had the highest percentage of fluent Welsh-speaking students of all universities in Wales (38%), followed by Aberystwyth University (30%) and Swansea University (17%).

== The Welsh Language and Education (Wales) Bill ==
In May 2025, The Welsh Language and Education (Wales) Bill was given royal assent and outlines the use of Welsh in education in Wales. The key provisions in the Bill are:

- provide a statutory basis for the target of one million Welsh speakers by 2050, as well as other targets relating to the use of the language, including in the workplace and socially;
- establish a standard method for describing Welsh language ability based on the common reference levels of the Common European Framework of Reference for Languages;
- make provisions for designating statutory language categories for schools, along with requirements relating to the amount of Welsh language education provided (including a minimum amount), and Welsh language learning goals for each category;
- link linguistic planning at a national level (by placing a duty on the Welsh Ministers to prepare a National Framework for Welsh Language Education and Learning Welsh), at local authority level (by placing a duty on the local authorities to prepare local Welsh in education strategic plans), and at school level (by placing a duty on schools to prepare Welsh language education delivery plans);
- establish a National Institute for Learning Welsh as a statutory body responsible for supporting people (of all ages) to learn Welsh.

The Bill requires a minimum percentage of education in Welsh in all three school categories, which includes "primarily Welsh language" at a minimum of 80%, "dual language" at a minimum of 50%, and "primarily English language, partly Welsh" at a minimum of 10%, with the aim of all school-leaving age pupils becoming independent Welsh language users.

== See also ==
- Education in Wales
- Welsh-speaking population
- Welsh language
- Scottish Gaelic-medium education
- Gaelscoil – Irish-medium education
- Kohanga reo – Maori language immersion schools in New Zealand
