= Arverno-Mediterrean dialects =

Subclass of Occitan

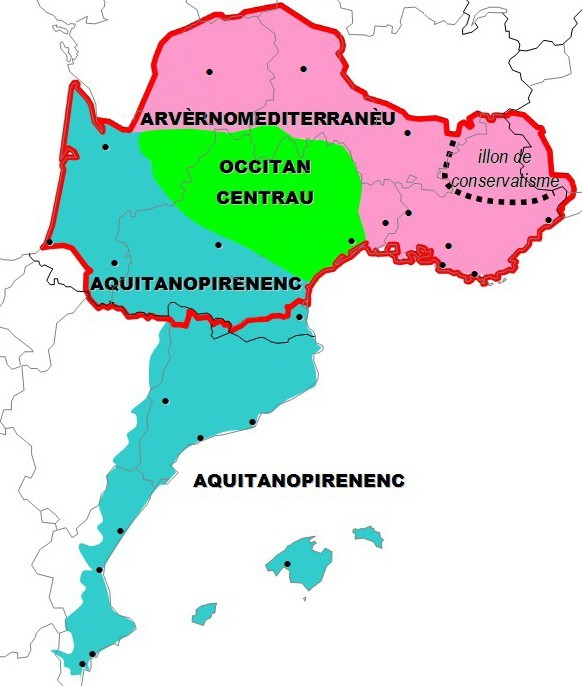
Supra-dialectal classification of the Occitano-Romance languages. Arverno-Mediterranean is in pink.

Arverno-Mediterranean or Alverno-Mediterranean (Occitan: arvèrnomediterranèu) is a supra-dialectal classification of the Occitan language, and also more broadly of the Occitano-Romance languages.

It combines North Occitan (Auvergenat, Limousin and Vivaro-Alpine) and Provençal into one language group.

== Description ==
This classification was first outlined by Pierre Bec, particularly in his work La langue occitane (The Occitan language). It is in this book that he first divides the Occitan language into Arverno-Mediterranean, Central Occitan and Aquitaine-Pyrenean.

Supra-dialectal classification of the Occitano-Romance languages according to the linguist Domergue Sumien.

This is a classification currently used by the academic community. regarding the comprehension of the supra-dialectal groups of Occitan. The principal has notably been updated by the linguist Domergue Sumien. It has also been adopted by the Occitan Academy.

=== Particular traits ===
The Arverno-Mediterranean linguistic area is centred around the principal linguistic hubs of the region, which are Auvergne and Provence, which give their names to the group.

It is differentiated by very specific linguistic feature such as the loss of final consonants and ‘s’ in the plural, as well as the strong use of nasal and semi-nasal sounds. Certain traits are unique to Arverno-Mediterranean: for example the letter ‘c’ is preferred in certain roots over ‘g’ (Lo cat in Arverno-Mediterranean as opposed to lo gat in Aquitaine-Pyrenean – "the cat" in English).

Linguist Arnaldo Moroldo (University of Nice) says that "It is characterized by the palatalization of the Latin consonant cluster /CT/: factu > fach."

For example, the Latin lacte ("milk") becomes lach.

== Samples ==
The following is an excerpt from a French version of the Parable of the Prodigal Son translated into various Arverno-Mediterranean dialects:

English:

A man had only two sons. The youngest said to his father: "It is time I were my own master and had some money; I need to be able to go away and see the world."

In French:

Un homme n'avait que deux fils. Le plus jeune dit à son père: "ll est temps que je sois mon maitre et que j'aie de l'argent; il faut que je puisse m'en aller et que je voie du pays."

In Auvergnat:

Un óme aviá mas dos garçons. Lo plus joine diguèt a son paire: "Lo moment es vengut que sia mon mestre e que aja d'argent; chal que puèscha men anar e que veja de païs."

In Limousin:

Un ome aviá mas dos filhs. Lo plus joune dissèt a son pair: "Es temps qu'ieu sia mon mèstre e qu'aja de l'argent; chau que puèscha men anar e que veja del pais."

In Provençal:

Un ome aviá rèn que dos fius. Lo plus joine diguet a son paire: "Es temps que fuga mon mèstre e qu'aga de sous; fau que posca men anar e que vega de pais."
