= Occitan alphabet =

Alphabet of the Occitan language

The Occitan alphabet consists of the following 23 Latin letters:

Majuscule forms (also called uppercase or capital letters)
A	B	C	D	E	F	G	H	I	J	L	M	N	O	P	Q	R	S	T	U	V	X	Z
Minuscule forms (also called lowercase or small letters)
a	b	c	d	e	f	g	h	i	j	l	m	n	o	p	q	r	s	t	u	v	x	z

The letters K, W and Y are considered foreign by Occitanians and are used only in words of foreign origin, incrementally integrated into Occitan, such as whisky, watt, Kenya.

== Letter names ==
Letters	Name	IPA (Standard pronunciation)	IPA (Regional pronunciation)
A a	a	[ˈa]	
B b	be, be (n)auta	[ˈbe, ˈbe ˈ(n)awtɔ]	Auv. [ˈbə, ˈbə ˈ(n)awtɔ] Niç. Va. [ˈbe, ˈbe ˈ(n)awta]
C c	ce	[ˈse]	Auv. [ˈsə]
D d	de	[ˈde]	Auv. [ˈdə]
E e	e	[ˈe]	Auv. [ˈə]
F f	èfa	[ˈɛfɔ]	Auv. Lim. [ˈefɔ] Niç. Va. [ˈɛfa]
G g	ge	[ˈdʒe]	Auv. [ˈdzə] Lim. [ˈdze] Gas. [ˈʒe]
H h	acha	[ˈatʃɔ]	Auv. Lim. [ˈatsɔ] Niç. Va. [ˈatʃa]
I i	i	[ˈi]	
J j	ji	[ˈdʒi]	Lim. [ˈdzi]
(K k)	ca	[ˈka]	
L l	èla	[ˈɛlɔ]	Auv. Lim. [ˈelɔ] Niç. Va. [ˈɛla]
M m	èma	[ˈɛmɔ]	Auv. Lim. [ˈemɔ] Niç. Va. [ˈɛma]
N n	èna	[ˈɛnɔ]	Auv. Lim. [ˈenɔ] Niç. Va. [ˈɛna]
O o	o (ò)	[ˈu (ˈɔ)]	
P p	pe	[ˈpe]	Auv. [ˈpə]
Q q	cu	[ˈky]	Auv. [ˈkjy]
R r	èrra	[ˈɛrɔ]	Auv. Lim. [ˈerɔ] Niç. [ˈɛʀa] Va. [ˈɛra] Pro. [ˈɛʀɔ]
S s	èssa	[ˈɛsɔ]	Auv. Lim. [ˈesɔ] Niç. Va. [ˈɛsa]
T t	te	[ˈte]	Auv. [ˈtə]
U u	u	[ˈy]	
V v	ve, ve bassa (Gas. ve, ve baisha)	[ˈbe, ˈbe ˈβasɔ]	Auv. [ˈvə, ˈvə ˈbasɔ] Lim. Pro. [ˈve, ˈve ˈbasɔ] Niç. Va. [ˈve, ˈve ˈbasa] Gas. [ˈbe, ˈbe ˈβaʃɔ]
(W w)	ve dobla	[ˈbe ˈðubːlɔ]	Auv. [ˈvə, ˈvə ˈdublɔ] Lim. Pro. [ˈve, ˈve ˈdublɔ] Niç. Va. [ˈve, ˈve ˈdubla] Gas. [ˈbe, ˈbe ˈðuβlɔ]
X x	ixa	[ˈitsɔ]	Auv. Lim. Pro. Gas. [ˈiksɔ] Niç. Va. [ˈiksa]
(Y y)	i grèga	[ˈi ˈɣɾɛɣɔ]	Auv. Lim. [ˈi ˈɡɾeɡɔ] Pro. [ˈi ˈɡɾɛɡɔ] Niç. Va. [ˈi ˈɡɾɛɡa]
Z z	izèda	[iˈzɛðɔ]	Auv. Lim. [iˈzedɔ] Pro. [iˈzɛdɔ] Niç. Va. [iˈzɛda]

The letter names are usually feminine. They may also be masculine, in which case the feminine names be nauta (B), ve bassa (V), ve dobla (W) and i grèga (Y) become masculine be naut, be bas, ve doble and i grèc.

Elision is common before a letter starting with a vowel.

== Diacritics ==
Several diacritics serve to modify the pronunciation of the letters of the Occitan alphabet.

- The grave accent (accent grèu) _̀ found on à, è, ò, indicates stressed, close vowels.
- The acute accent (accent agut) _́ found on á, é, í, ó, ú, indicates stressed, open vowels.
- The diaeresis (trèma) ¨ found on ï, ü, indicates that ï and ü are pronounced separately from a previous letter.
- The cedilla (cedilha) ¸ found under ç, indicates that ç is pronounced [s], not [k].
- The interpunct (ponch interior, punt interior) · found between two consecutive consonants: n·h and s·h and indicates a distinction between n·h and nh or s·h and sh. This is used in Gascon Occitan, which features [h] as an allophone of /f/. In the Middle Ages, the interpunct was common throughout Aquitania (see Old Occitan).

The diacritics are required on the capitals. For example: Índia, Àustria, Sant Çubran, FÒRÇA, SOÏSSA, IN·HÈRN.

== Sound-to-spelling correspondences ==
Unless noted, regional IPA values are the same as Standard Occitan. Despite being listed as dialect of Occitan, Gascon are listed as separate language here and it is excluded from this list.

=== Consonants ===
Spelling		IPA value	Exceptions	Regional value
b	Between two vowels In contact with r, l, and z	/β/		/b/ (Provençal, Limousin, Auvergnat, Vivaro-Alpine, Niçard)
b	Otherwise	/b/		
-b		/p/	∅, /n/, /m/ (before p, b, m) amb	∅ (Provençal, Limousin, Auvergnat)
bt		/tt/		/t/ (Provençal, Limousin, Auvergnat, Vivaro-Alpine, Niçard)
c	Before e, i	/s/		/kj/ before u, /ʃ/ before i (Auvergnat)
c	Otherwise	/k/		/kj/ before u, /ʃ/ before i (Auvergnat)
-c		/k/		∅ (Provençal, Limousin, Auvergnat)
ç	Before a, o, u	/s/		/ʃ/ before u (Auvergnat)
-ç		/s/		∅ (Limousin, Auvergnat) ∅ after r (Provençal)
cc	Before e, i	/ts/		/ks/ (also /s/) (Provençal, Limousin, Auvergnat, Vivaro-Alpine, Niçard) /kʃ/ before i (Auvergnat)
ch		/tʃ/		/ts/ (Auvergnat, Limousin dialect) /tʃ/ before u (Auvergnat)
-ch		/tʃ/		∅ (Provençal, Limousin, Auvergnat)
d	Between two vowels In contact with r, l, and z	/ð/		/d/ (Provençal, Limousin, Vivaro-Alpine, Niçard)
d	Otherwise	/d/		/dj/ before i and u (Auvergnat)
-d		/t/		∅ (Provençal, Limousin, Auvergnat)
dd		/dd/		/d/ (Provençal, Limousin, Auvergnat, Vivaro-Alpine, Niçard)
f		/f/		
g	Before e, i	/dʒ/		/dz/ (Limousin, Auvergnat) /dʒ/ before i (Auvergnat)
g	Between two vowels In contact with r, l, z	/ɣ/		/ɡ/ (Provençal, Limousin, Auvergnat, Vivaro-Alpine, Niçard)
g	Otherwise	/ɡ/		
-g		/k/	/tʃ/ mièg, cluèg	∅ (Provençal, Limousin, Auvergnat)
gd		/t/		/d/ (Provençal, Limousin, Auvergnat, Vivaro-Alpine, Niçard)
gu-	Between two vowels In contact with r, l, and z	/ɣ/		/ɡ/ (Provençal, Limousin, Vivaro-Alpine, Niçard)
gu-	Otherwise	/ɡ/		/ɡj/ before i (Auvergnat)
h		∅		
j		/dʒ/		/dz/ (Limousin, Auvergnat) /dʒ/ before i, u (Auvergnat)
k		/k/		/kj/ before i, u (Auvergnat)
l		/l/		/lj/ before i, u (Auvergnat)
-l		/l/		/w/ mèl → mèu (Provençal) ∅ in a paroxyton word (most dialects)
ll		/ll/		/l/ (Provençal, Limousin, Auvergnat, Vivaro-Alpine, Niçard)
lh		/ʎ/		/j/ (Provençal)
-lh		/l/		/w/ solelh → soleu (Provençal) /j/ (Limousin, Auvergnat, Niçard)
m	Before consonants other than m, b, and p	/n/		/ⁿ/ after consonants (with semi-nasalization of the last vowel) (Provençal, Limousin, Auvergnat, Vivaro-Alpine, Niçard)
m	Otherwise	/m/		
-m		/n/	/m/ (before p, b, m) amb	/ⁿ/ (with semi-nasalization of the last vowel) (Provençal, Limousin, Auvergnat, Niçard) /ⁿ/ in first-person plural conjugations (Vivaro-Alpine)
mm		/mm/		/m/ (Provençal, Limousin, Auvergnat, Vivaro-Alpine, Niçard)
n	Before p, b, m	/m/		
n	Before c, qu-, g, and gu-	/ŋ/		
n	Before f	/ɱ/		
n	Otherwise	/n/	∅ benlèu, bensai, tanbén, tanplan	/ⁿ/ (with semi-nasalization of the last vowel) (Provençal, Limousin, Auvergnat, Vivaro-Alpine, Niçard) /nj/ before i, u (Auvergnat)
-n		∅	/n/ in some words	/ⁿ/ in some words (Limousin, Auvergnat)
nn		/nn/		/n/ (Provençal, Limousin, Auvergnat, Vivaro-Alpine, Niçard)
-nd, -nt		/n/		/ⁿ/ (Provençal, Limousin, Auvergnat, Niçard) /ⁿt/ (Niçard, Vivaro-Alpine)
nh, gn		/ɲ/		
-nh		/n/		/ⁿ/ (Provençal, Limousin, Auvergnat, Niçard) /ɲ/ (Vivaro-Alpine)
p		/p/		/pj/ before i, u (Auvergnat)
-p		/p/		∅ (Provençal, Limousin, Auvergnat) /w/ in three words: còp, tròp, and cap "coast" (Niçard)
qu-		/k/		/kj/ before i, u (Auvergnat)
r	In the start of a word After n, l	/r/		/ʀ/ (Provençal, Limousin, Auvergnat, Vivaro-Alpine, Niçard)
r	Otherwise	/ɾ/		
rr		/r/		/ʀ/ (Provençal, Limousin, Auvergnat, Vivaro-Alpine, Niçard) /ɾ/ (Limousin, Auvergnat, Niçard)
-r		∅	/ɾ/ in some words	/ʀ/ (Provençal) /ɾ/ (Vivaro-Alpine)
-rm		/ɾ/		/ʀ/ (Provençal, Niçard) /ɾm/ (Vivaro-Alpine)
-rn		/ɾ/		/ʀ/ (Provençal) /ʀp/ (Niçard) /ɾn/ (Vivaro-Alpine)
s	Between two vowels	/z/		/ʒ/ before i, u (Auvergnat)
s	Otherwise	/s/		/ʃ/ before i, u (Auvergnat)
-s		/s/	∅ in some words like pas, pus, res, and dins	/z/ before other words starting in a vowel (Provençal, Niçard)
ss		/s/		/ʃ/ before i, u (Auvergnat)
sh		/ʃ/		
t		/t/		/tj/ before i, u (Auvergnat)
-t		/t/	∅ (in -ment adverbs and present participles)	∅ (Provençal, Limousin, Auvergnat) ∅ in past participles ending in vowels (Vivaro-Alpine)
tg, tj		/tʃ/		/dʒ/ (Provençal, Niçard, Vivaro-Alpine); before i, u (Auvergnat) /dz/ (Limousin, Auvergnat)
tl		/ll/		/l/ (Provençal, Vivaro-Alpine, Niçard) /ⁿl/ (Limousin, Auvergnat)
tm		/mm/		/m/ (Provençal, Vivaro-Alpine, Niçard) /ⁿm/ (Limousin, Auvergnat)
tn		/nn/		/n/ (Provençal, Vivaro-Alpine, Niçard) /ⁿn/ (Limousin, Auvergnat)
tz		/ts/		/dz/ (Provençal, Limousin, Auvergnat) /z/ (Vivaro-Alpine, Niçard)
-tz		/ts/		/s/ (Provençal, Niçard, Vivaro-Alpine) ∅ (Limousin, Auvergnat)
v	Between two vowels In contact with r, l, and z	/β/		/v/ (Provençal, Limousin, Auvergnat, Vivaro-Alpine, Niçard)
v	Otherwise	/b/		
w		/w/, /b/, /β/		/v/, /b/, /β/ (Provençal, Limousin, Auvergnat, Vivaro-Alpine, Niçard)
x	Before consonants	/s/		
x	Otherwise	/ts/		/ɡz/ in the prefix ex- before vowels (Provençal, Limousin, Auvergnat, Vivaro-Alpine, Niçard) /ɡʒ/ before i, u (Auvergnat)
z		/z/		/ʒ/ before i, u (Auvergnat)
-z		/s/		

=== Vowels ===
Spelling	IPA value	Exceptions	Regional value
a	/a/		/ɒ/ before tonic accent (Limousin, Auvergnat)
-a	/ɔ/		∅ in -ia suffix (Provençal)
-as	/ɔs/		/ɔ/ (Provençal) /a/ (Auvergnat, Niçard) /aː/ (Limousin); 2nd person singular verbs: /ɔs/ (Provençal)

== See also ==
- Occitan conjugation
- Occitan language
- Occitan phonology
