= Occitan phonology =

Sound system of the Occitan language

This article describes the phonology of the Occitan language.

== Consonants ==
Below is a consonant chart that covers multiple dialects. Where symbols for consonants occur in pairs, the left represents a voiceless consonant and the right represents a voiced consonant.

IPA chart of Occitan consonants
	Labial	Dental/ Alveolar	Palato- alveolar	Palatal		Velar	Uvular/ Glottal
	Labial	Dental/ Alveolar	Palato- alveolar	plain	lab.	Velar	Uvular/ Glottal
Nasal	m	n		ɲ		(ŋ)	
Plosive	p b	t d				k ɡ	
Affricate		ts (dz)	tʃ dʒ				
Fricative	f (v) β	s z ð	(ʃ) (ʒ)			ɣ	(h)
Approximant				j	ɥ	w	
Lateral		l		ʎ			
Trill		r					(ʀ)
Tap		ɾ					

Notes

- The phoneme /ʃ/ is mostly found in Southern Occitan (written ⟨(i)sh⟩ in Gascon, ⟨ch⟩ in Provençal, and ⟨(i)ss⟩ in Languedocien).
- The distinction between /v/ ⟨v⟩ and /b/ ⟨b⟩ is general in Provençal, Vivaro-Alpine, Auvergnat and Limousin. However, in Languedocien and Gascon, the phonemes /b/ and /v/ are neutralized as /b/ (thus /v/ has disappeared).
- In Languedocien:
  - the phonemes /b, d, ɡ/ indicate three kinds of sounds, depending on what surrounds them:
    - a voiced plosive sound [b, d, ɡ] by default
    - devoiced to [p, t, k] phrase-finally or before a voiceless sound
    - a voiced fricative [β, ð, ɣ] when both preceded and followed by voiced continuants (i.e., vowels or [r, l, z]) within the same phrase.
  - the phonemes /ts/ and /dz/ and the sequences /p+s/, /k+s/ are neutralized as /ts/ (thus /dz/, /p+s/ and /k+s/ have disappeared).
- In Auvergnat and Limousin, and locally in other dialects,
  - the phonemes /ts/ and /tʃ/ are neutralized as /ts/ (thus /tʃ/ has disappeared).
  - the phonemes /dz/ and /dʒ/ are neutralized as /dz/ (thus /dʒ/ has disappeared).
- In Auvergnat, most of the consonants, except /r/, can have a palatalized sound before i and u. Consequently, the consonant phonemes have two kinds of sounds, one being not palatal (by default) and the other being palatal (before i and u): /p/ → [p, pj]; /b/ → [b, bj]; /t/ → [t, tj]; /d/ → [d, dj]; /k/ → [k, kj]; /ɡ/ → [ɡ, ɡj]; /f/ → [f, fj]; /v/ → [v, vj]; /s/ → [s, ʃ]; /z/ → [z, ʒ]; /ts/ → [ts, tʃ]; /dz/ → [dz, dʒ]; /m/ → [m, mj]; /n/ → [n, nj]; /l/ → [l, lj].
- In one part (and only one part) of Limousin, a transphonologization has occurred:
  - The old phonemes /ts/, /dz/ have now become [s], [z], less frequently [θ], [ð].
  - The old phonemes /s/, /z/ have now become [ʃ], [ʒ], less frequently [h], [ɦ].
- In the Provençal in general, and partially in other dialects, the phonemes /j/ and /ʎ/ are neutralized as /j/ (thus /ʎ/ has disappeared).
- The original rhotic consonants, /ɾ/ (tapped) and /r/ (trilled), have shown important evolutions:
  - In Provençal and partially in other dialects, there is now an opposition between /ɾ/ (tapped) and /ʀ/ (uvular) (whereas /r/ has disappeared). This feature is shared with Portuguese. In the cases when the opposition is impossible between the two phonemes, the default realization is /ʀ/ (it was /r/ in the original pattern).
  - In most of Limousin, Auvergne, Vivarais and Niçard, the phonemes /ɾ/ and /r/ are neutralized as /r/ (or even /ʀ/).

=== Gascon consonants ===
- Gascon shares some traits with Languedocien:
  - The phonemes /b, d, ɡ/ have the same realization as described above for Languedocien.
  - The phonemes /b/ and /v/ of the general pattern are neutralized as /b/. It seems possible, however, that the phoneme /v/ never existed in Gascon.
- Gascon and Southern Languedocien do not have the semivowel /ɥ/ (Gascon has /w/, SL has /β/) and have the same distribution for the phonemes /dʒ/ ⟨tg, tj⟩ and /ʒ/ ⟨j, g⟩.
- A glottal fricative sound /h/ is recognized among the dialects of Gascon.
- In one part of Gascon, the palatal affiricates /tʃ/ /dʒ/ become plosive palatal consonants: [c], [ɟ].

== Vowels ==
Vowels
IPA	Examples	English approximation
i	vitz	cease
y	luna	as in French rue and German Blüte
e	fetge	say (without the y sound)
ɛ	mètge	sect
œ (Note: This sound is only present in the Limousin, Auvergnat, Provençal dialects.)	fuelha	blur
a	quatre	sack
ɔ	escòla	cause
u	Tolosa	soup

Diphthongs
IPA	Examples	English approximation
aj	maire	tie
aw	pausa	
ɛj	glèisa	bay
ɛw	benlèu	
ej	rei	bay
ew	Euròpa	
ɔj	jòia	boy
ɔw	plòure	
ja	embestiar	yard
jɛ	fièr	yes
je	oriental	yes
jɔ	luòc	yawn
iw	viure	beware
ju	accion	you
wa	qüadragenari	wag
wɛ	oèst	wet
ɥɛ	fuèlha	
we	bilingüe	wait
wɔ	doás	war
uj	soi	you yawned
wi	Loís	weed
ɥi	ambigüitat	

Triphthongs
IPA	Examples	English approximation
jaw	suau	coy owl
jɛj	fièira	
jɛw	camaièu	
jej	fieiral	yay
jew	ieu	
jɔw	buòu	
ɥɛj	puèi	

=== Vowel pronunciation according to position ===
Spelling	Stressed		Unstressed but not final		Unstressed and final	
Spelling	Pronunciation	Examples	Pronunciation	Examples	Pronunciation	Examples
a	/a/ or /ɔ/	bala, cantaràs, occitan /a/ veniá /ɔ/	/a/	partir /a/	/ɔ/	companhia /ɔ/
e	/e/ or /ɛ/	pel /e/ (skin) pèl /ɛ/ (hair)	/e/	esfòrç /e/	/e/	autre /e/
o	/u/ or /ɔ/	rascós, informacion /u/ esfòrç /ɔ/	/u/	portal /u/	/u/	basco /u/

Note:

- The grapheme ⟨a⟩, when in final position and after the word's stress, is pronounced /ɔ/ in general (locally: /a/, /ə/).
- The grapheme ⟨á⟩ is pronounced /ɔ/ in general (locally: /e/, /ɛ/).
- Final ⟨o⟩ is generally used in loanwords, especially from Catalan, Spanish and Italian.

=== General ablaut ===
In an unstressed position, some vowels cannot be realized and become more closed vowels:

- The stressed vowel /ɛ/ ⟨è⟩ becomes the unstressed vowel [e] ⟨e⟩. For instance (stress underlined): tèrra /ˈtɛrrɔ/ → terrassa /teˈrrasɔ/.
- The stressed vowel /ɔ/ ⟨ò⟩ becomes the unstressed vowel [u] ⟨o⟩. For instance (stress underlined): còde /ˈkɔde/ → codificar /kudifiˈka/.
- In some local dialects, especially in the Languedocien variety of Guyenne, the stressed vowel /a/ ⟨a⟩ becomes the unstressed vowel [ɔ] ⟨a⟩. For instance (stress underlined): bala /ˈbalɔ/ → balon /bɔˈlu/.
  - Also in Guyenne, the vowel ⟨a⟩, when stressed, is pronounced [ɔ] when followed by a nasal consonant such as /n, m, ɲ/ ⟨n, m, nh⟩ or a final ⟨n⟩ that is silent: montanha, pan /munˈtɔɲɔ, ˈpɔ/ (instead of /munˈtaɲɔ, ˈpa/). Javanese also similarly has such vowel rounding, although the penultimate vowel /ɔ/ (< /*a/) could occur before any consonant.
- In Limousin, Auvergnat, Vivaro-Alpine and in most of Provençal (though not in Niçard), the stressed diphthong /aw/ ⟨au⟩ becomes the unstressed diphthong [ɔw] ⟨au⟩. For instance (stress underlined): sauta /ˈsawtɔ/ → sautar /sɔwˈta/.
- In Limousin, Auvergnat, Vivaro-Alpine and in most of Provençal (though not in Niçard), the stressed diphthong /aj/ ⟨ai⟩ becomes the unstressed diphthong [ej] ⟨ai⟩. For instance (stress underlined): laissa /ˈlajsɔ/ → laissar /lejˈsa/.

=== Vowel changes in Auvergnat ===
One typical characteristic of Auvergnat (also a feature of some neighbouring dialects of Vivaro-Alpine) is the transformation of the following phonemes:

- The old phoneme /ɛ/ has become [e].
- The old phoneme /e/ has become [ə] or [ɪ].

In an unstressed position, some vowels cannot be realized and become more closed vowels:

- The stressed vowel /e/ ⟨è⟩ becomes the unstressed vowel [ə (ɪ)] ⟨e⟩. For instance (stress underlined): tèrra /ˈterɔ/ → terrassa /təˈrasɔ/.
- The stressed vowel /ɔ/ ⟨ò⟩ becomes the unstressed vowel [u] ⟨o⟩. For instance (stress underlined): còde /ˈkɔdə/ → codificar /kudifiˈka/.
- In the northern part of Auvergne, the stressed vowel /a/ ⟨a⟩ (unrounded) becomes the unstressed vowel [ɒ] ⟨a⟩ (rounded). For instance (stress underlined): bala /ˈbalɔ/ → balon /bɒˈlu/.
- The stressed diphthong /aw/ ⟨au⟩ becomes the unstressed diphthong [ɔw (u, œ)] ⟨au⟩. For instance (stress underlined): sauta /ˈsawtɔ/ → sautar /sɔwˈta/.
- The stressed diphthong /aj/ ⟨ai⟩ becomes the unstressed diphthong [ej (i)] ⟨ai⟩. For instance (stress underlined): laissa /ˈlajsɔ/ → laissar /lejˈsa/.

=== Vowel changes in Limousin ===
A strong characteristic of Limousin (also a feature of some neighbouring dialects of Vivaro-Alpine) is the neutralization of the phonemes /e/ and /ɛ/ in one single phoneme /e/, that can have various degrees of opening.

In words of popular formation, the sequences ⟨as, es, is, òs, os, us, ues⟩ [as, es, is, ɔs, us, ys, œs], when at the end of a syllable, first became [ah, eh, ih, ɔh, uh, yh, œh] and have now become long vowels, [aː, (ej), iː, ɔː, uː, yː, œː], which tends to create new phonemes with a relevant opposition between short vowels and long vowels. The same phenomenon exists in one part of Vivarais, and also occurred in the transition from Old to Middle French.

In unstressed positions, vowels /i, y, u/ become lax sounds [ɪ, ʏ, ʊ].

In an unstressed position, some vowels cannot be realized and become more closed vowels:

- The stressed vowel /ɔ/ ⟨ò⟩ becomes the unstressed vowel [u] ⟨o⟩. For instance (stress underlined): còde /ˈkɔde/ → codificar /kudifiˈka/.
- The stressed vowel /a/ ⟨a⟩ (unrounded) becomes the unstressed vowel [ɒ] ⟨a⟩ (rounded). For instance (stress underlined): bala /ˈbalɔ/ → balon /bɒˈlu/.
- The stressed diphthong /aw/ ⟨au⟩ becomes the unstressed diphthong [ɔw] ⟨au⟩. For instance (stress underlined): sauta /ˈsawtɔ/ → sautar /sɔwˈta/.
- The stressed diphthong /aj/ ⟨ai⟩ becomes the unstressed diphthong [ej] ⟨ai⟩. For instance (stress underlined): laissa /ˈlajsɔ/ → laissar /lejˈsa/.

== Regional variation ==
IPA	Examples	English equivalent
Auvergnat
v	vent	valid
ʃ	servici	shoe
dz	gente	ads
ts	chabra	cats
œ	fuelha	blur
wɔ	pòrta	war
ɥi	ajuidar	French lui
wi	boisson	we
œj	nueit	French accueil

IPA	Examples	English equivalent
Gascon
ʒ	joença	measure
h	hemna	high
ʃ	Foish	shoe
yw	cuu	
wew	ueu	

IPA	Examples	English equivalent
Limousin
v	vent	valid
dz	gente	ads
ts	chabra	cats
œ	fuelha	blur
o	còsta	between spoke and sport
ɥi	ajuidar	French lui
wej	boisson	away

IPA	Examples	English equivalent
Provençal
v	vent	valid
ʒ	age	measure
œ	fuelha	blur
wɔ	bòna	war
ʀ	tèrra	French rue

IPA	Examples	English equivalent
Vivaro-Alpine
v	vent	valid

- In Limousin and Auvergnat, final consonants, except for ⟨nh⟩ and ⟨m⟩, are generally muted when not directly followed by a word with a vocalic initial: filh [fi], potz [pu], fach [fa], limon [liˈmu] but estelum [ejteˈlun], estanh [ejˈtan], un fach ancian [yn fats ɔnˈsja].
- In Limousin and Auvergnat, when a diphthong starts in ⟨o⟩ or ⟨u⟩, it is always a rising diphthong: boisson [bwiˈsu] (Auvergnat) and [bwejˈsu] (Limousin) versus [bujˈsu] (Languedocien) or [bujˈsun] (Provençal).
- In all dialects but Languedocien, final ⟨l⟩ is heavily velarized ("dark l") and therefore usually spelled ⟨u⟩: especial [espeˈsjaɫ] / especiau [espeˈsjaw] but especiala [espeˈsjalɔ] in the feminine (except in Gascon where it stays as especiau).

== Word stress ==
Word stress has limited mobility. It can only fall on:

- the last syllable (oxytones or mots aguts 'acute words')
- the penultimate syllable (paroxytones or mots plans 'plain words').
- However, in Niçard, and less commonly in the Cisaupenc dialect of the Occitan Valleys, the stress can also fall on the antepenultimate (third from last) syllable (proparoxytones or mots esdrúchols 'slip words'). These were regarded as irregular stress in the orthography and they marked by diacritics (see below).

These proparoxytones are equivalent to paroxytones in all other dialects. For instance (stress underlined):

general pattern (no proparoxytones)	Cisaupenc (some proparoxytones)	Niçard (many proparoxytones)
pagina	pàgina	pàgina
arma, anma	ànima, anma	ànima
dimenge	diamenja	diménegue
manja, marga	mània	mànega

The stress is oxytone if the last syllable ending in a consonant or a diphthong ending in -u or -i (occitan /utsiˈta/, verai); while the stress is penultimate if the last syllable ending in a vowel (or vowel + -s) and vowel + -n when in the case of third-person plural verb forms (libre, libres, parlan), the stress is also penultimate when the syllable ending in two different vowels (estatua). Irregular stresses is normally marked orthographically by acutes (á, é, í, ó, ú) and graves (à, è, ò).

== Historical development ==
As a Romance language, Occitan developed from Vulgar Latin. Old Occitan (around the eighth through the fourteenth centuries) had a similar pronunciation to present-day Occitan; the major differences were:

- Before the 13th century, ⟨c⟩ had softened before front vowels to [t͡s], not yet to [s].
- In the early Middle Ages, ⟨z⟩ between vowels represented the affricate [d͡z], not yet /z/.
- In early Old Occitan, ⟨z⟩ represented [t͡s] in final position.
- In the late Middle Ages, the letter ⟨a⟩ went from [a] to [ɑ] in unaccented position and in stressed syllables followed by a nasal consonant.
- When not part of a diphthong, the vowel spelled ⟨o⟩ was probably pronounced as [ʊ], not yet [u].
- Between vowels, the letter ⟨i⟩ or ⟨j⟩ represented, for most speech in Occitania, [j]. However, this could become [ʒ], especially down south: it later became [d͡ʒ], which, in turn, would locally depalatalize to [d͡z] in Middle Occitan.
- In words where /ɾ/ was preceded by a diphthong whose second element was [j], it was sometimes palatalized to [rʲ].
- In earlier times, some dialects used [ç] instead of the more common [ʃ]: despite their similarity, this often led to contrasting spellings (⟨laishar⟩ or ⟨laischar⟩ [lajˈʃaɾ] vs. ⟨laichar⟩ [lajˈçaɾ]; ⟨fois⟩ or ⟨foish⟩ [fʊjʃ] vs. ⟨foih⟩ [fʊiç]) before it became [s] commonly across the language (⟨laissar⟩ [lajˈsaɾ], ⟨Fois⟩ [fujs]).
- In the pre-literary period of early Old Occitan /u/ had not been fronted to [y], although strong doubts exist as to when the change actually happened.
- When between vowels, /d/ lenited to [ð], though this is still true for only Gascon and Languedocien dialects; elsewhere, it eventually turned to [z] or was deleted.
- In Gascon, there was one voiced labial phoneme that was [b] in the beginning of a word and [β] between vowels. This still happens today and has spread to the neighbouring Languedocien dialect.
- The phoneme ⟨lh⟩ was exclusively pronounced [ʎ] (it is now [j] in intervocalic or final position in some dialects).

=== Old Occitan phonology ===
Consonants
IPA	Examples	English approximation
b	beutatz	beauty
k	cansó	neglect
tʃ	chansó	match
d	domna	doll
ð	foudatz	this
f	fol	fool
ɡ	gay	garage
ç	Foih	human (but not happy)
dʒ	jorn	raging
l	lauzeta	laundry
m	amors	marine
n	benanansa	natural
p	perduda	captain
ɾ	vestidura	Italian mare
r(r)	rossinhols	Spanish rápido
s	sospir	last
ʃ	laishar	shoe
t	tuih	fact
v	Ventadorn	valid
ks	amix	box
z	roza	amazing
ts	amanz	cats

Full vowels
IPA	Examples	English approximation
a	quar	sack
e	fetz	say (without the y sound)
ɛ	melhs	sect
i	vida	cease
ɔ	midons	cause
u	Tholoza	soup
y	negús	French lunette

Diphthongs
IPA	Examples	English approximation
aj	esmai	tie
ej	mezeis	bay
ɛj	gleiza	bay
ɔj	enoyós	boy
ɔw	mou	
aw	lauzengiers	now
ew	Deus	
ɛw	leu	
ja	chastiar	yard
je	nien	yes
jɛ	quier	yes
wɔ	huoills	yawn
ju	jauzion	you
iw	chaitiu	beware
uj	cui	you yawned
wa	aquatic	wag
wɛ	oest	wet
ɥɛ	fuelha	wet
wi	Loís	weed

Triphthongs
IPA	Examples	English approximation
waw	suau	
jej	fieyral	
jɛj	fieyra	
jew	yeu	
wɔw	buou	
ɥɛj	pueys	

== See also ==
- Catalan phonology
- Occitan conjugation
- Occitan alphabet
