= Lempdes =

- Commune
- Coat of arms
- Location of Lempdes
- Location within France Location within Auvergne-Rhône-Alpes
- Coordinates: 45°46′19″N 3°11′40″E
- Country: France
- Region: Auvergne-Rhône-Alpes
- Department: Puy-de-Dôme
- Arrondissement: Clermont-Ferrand
- Canton: Pont-du-Château
- Intercommunality: Clermont Auvergne Métropole

Government
  - Mayor (2020–2026): Henri Gisselbrecht
- Area^{1}: 12.3 km^{2} (4.7 sq mi)
- Elevation: 320 m (1,050 ft)
- Highest elevation: 505 m (1,657 ft)
- Lowest elevation: 317 m (1,040 ft)
- Population (2023): 8,709
  - Density: 708/km^{2} (1,830/sq mi)
- Time zone: UTC+01:00 (CET)
  - Summer (DST): UTC+02:00 (CEST)
- INSEE/Postal code: 63193 /63370
- ^{1} French Land Register data, which excludes lakes, ponds, glaciers > 1 km^{2} (0.386 sq mi or 247 acres) and river estuaries.

Lempdes (French pronunciation: [lɑ̃ːd]; Auvergnat: Lende) is a commune in the Puy-de-Dôme department in Auvergne in central France.

== Population ==
Historical population
Year	Pop.	±% p.a.
1968	3,546	—
1975	5,836	+7.38%
1982	8,015	+4.64%
1990	8,591	+0.87%
1999	8,401	−0.25%
2007	8,331	−0.10%
2012	8,348	+0.04%
2017	8,409	+0.15%
2023	8,709	+0.59%
Source: INSEE

== Sights ==
The neo-romanesque parish church of St Étienne was built in 1867, replacing a previous church building that dated from the 12th century. It is first recorded in a document of the beginning of the 13th century.

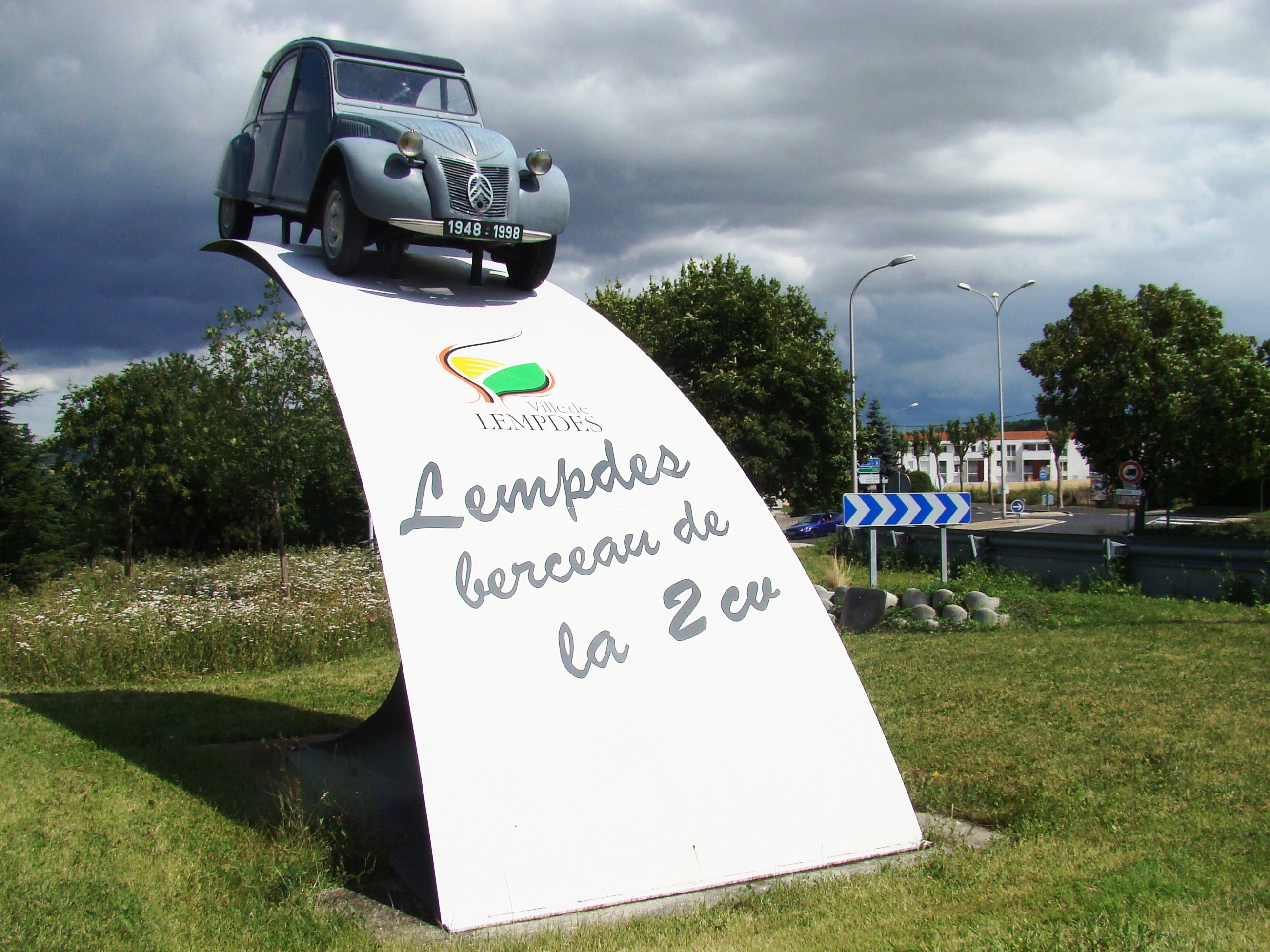
The famous 2CV car was invented in Lempdes

== Notable people ==
- Pierre-Jules Boulanger, inventor of 2CV car.
- Jean-Baptiste Lamy, Archbishop of Santa Fe, New Mexico

== See also ==
- Communes of the Puy-de-Dôme department
