= Gavot =

Gavot may refer to:

- Gavòt, a subdialect of Vivaro-Alpine Occitan.
- Gavotte, a dance that exists in both folk forms and historical court forms.
