= Saint-Bonnet-près-Bort =

- Commune
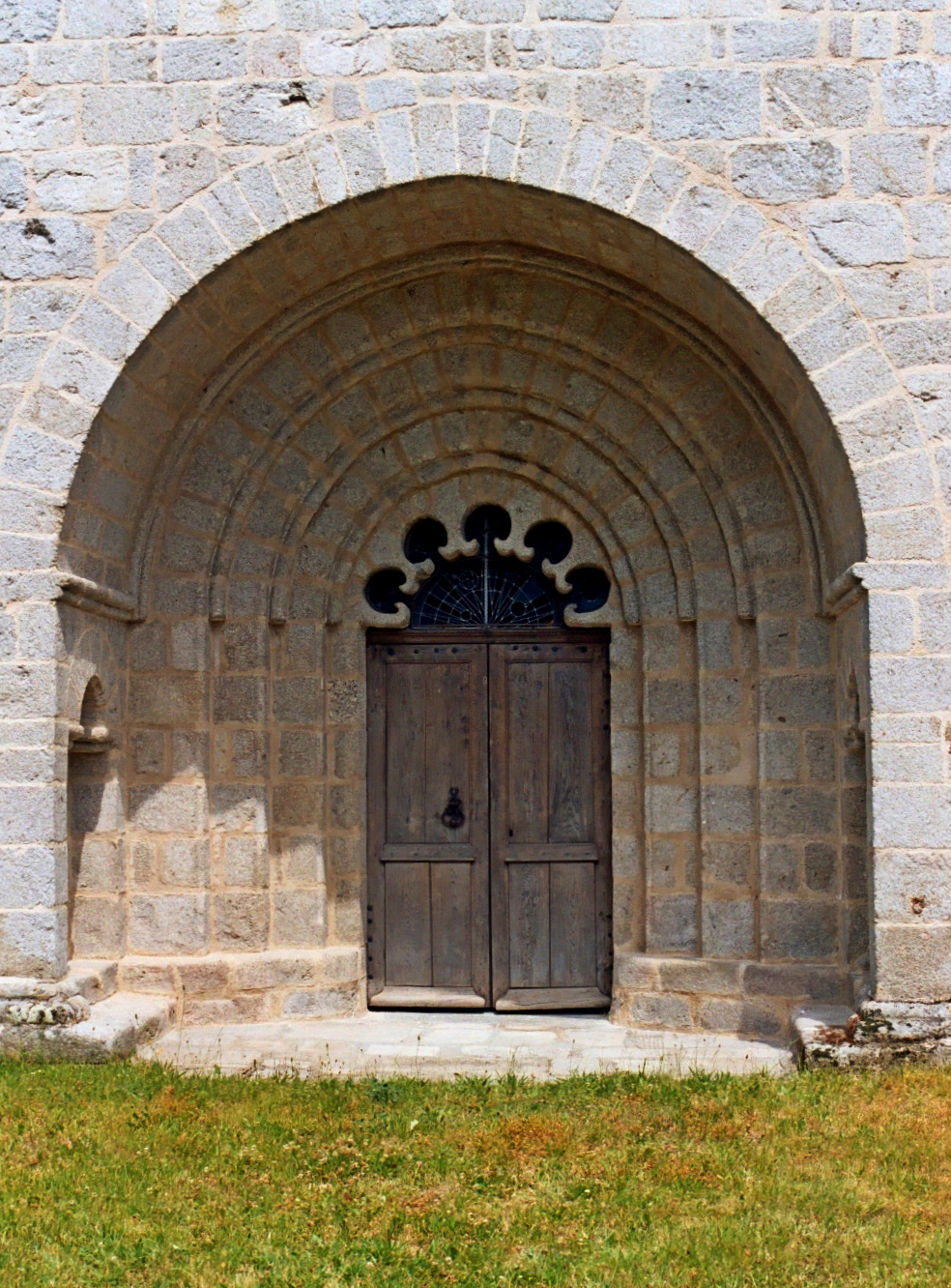
- Church door

- Coat of arms
- Location of Saint-Bonnet-près-Bort
- Location within France Location within Nouvelle-Aquitaine
- Coordinates: 45°30′16″N 2°25′02″E
- Country: France
- Region: Nouvelle-Aquitaine
- Department: Corrèze
- Arrondissement: Ussel
- Canton: Haute-Dordogne
- Intercommunality: Haute-Corrèze Communauté

Government
  - Mayor (2020–2026): Daniel Couderc
- Area^{1}: 17.14 km^{2} (6.62 sq mi)
- Elevation: 700 m (2,300 ft)
- Highest elevation: 743 m (2,438 ft)
- Lowest elevation: 637 m (2,090 ft)
- Population (2023): 188
  - Density: 11.0/km^{2} (28.4/sq mi)
- Time zone: UTC+01:00 (CET)
  - Summer (DST): UTC+02:00 (CEST)
- INSEE/Postal code: 19190 /19200
- ^{1} French Land Register data, which excludes lakes, ponds, glaciers > 1 km^{2} (0.386 sq mi or 247 acres) and river estuaries.

Saint-Bonnet-près-Bort (French pronunciation: [sɛ̃ bɔnɛ pʁɛ bɔʁ], literally Saint-Bonnet near Bort; Auvergnat: Sent Bonet prep Baurt) is a commune in the Corrèze department in central France.

== Population ==
Historical population
Year	Pop.	±% p.a.
1968	202	—
1975	168	−2.60%
1982	162	−0.52%
1990	176	+1.04%
1999	165	−0.71%
2007	182	+1.23%
2012	195	+1.39%
2017	192	−0.31%
2023	188	−0.35%
Source: INSEE

== See also ==
- Communes of the Corrèze department
