= Mezel =

- Part of Mur-sur-Allier
- Location of Mezel
- Location within France Location within Auvergne-Rhône-Alpes
- Coordinates: 45°45′21″N 3°14′35″E
- Country: France
- Region: Auvergne-Rhône-Alpes
- Department: Puy-de-Dôme
- Arrondissement: Clermont-Ferrand
- Canton: Billom
- Commune: Mur-sur-Allier
- Area^{1}: 8.4 km^{2} (3.2 sq mi)
- Elevation: 450 m (1,480 ft)
- Highest elevation: 603 m (1,978 ft)
- Lowest elevation: 313 m (1,027 ft)
- Population (2022): 1,941
  - Density: 230/km^{2} (600/sq mi)
- Time zone: UTC+01:00 (CET)
  - Summer (DST): UTC+02:00 (CEST)
- Postal code: 63115
- ^{1} French Land Register data, which excludes lakes, ponds, glaciers > 1 km^{2} (0.386 sq mi or 247 acres) and river estuaries.

Mezel (Auvergnat: Meselh) is a former commune in the Puy-de-Dôme department in Auvergne in central France. On 1 January 2019, it was merged with Dallet into the new commune Mur-sur-Allier.

== See also ==
- Communes of the Puy-de-Dôme department
