= Dallet =

- Part of Mur-sur-Allier
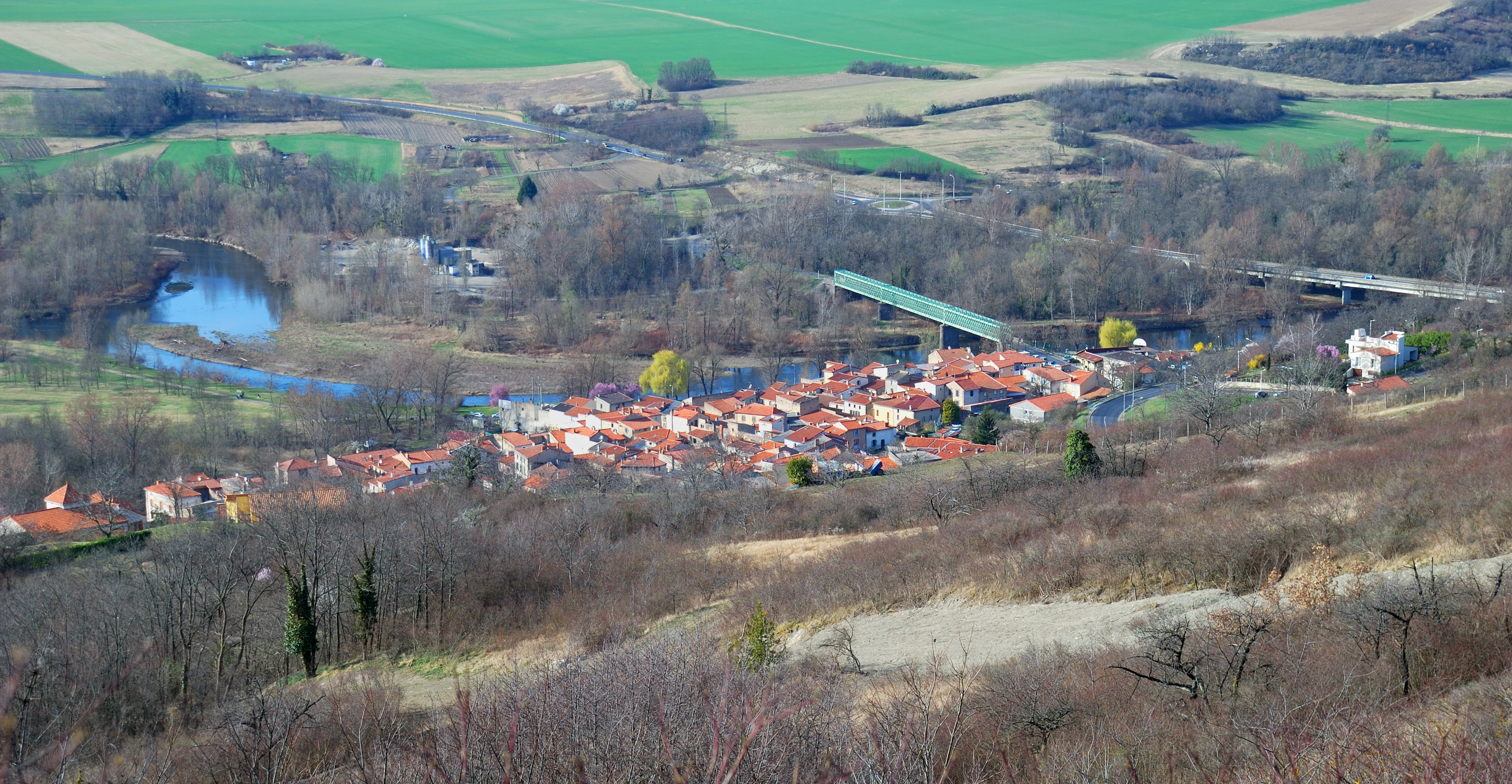
- Location of Dallet
- Location within France Location within Auvergne-Rhône-Alpes
- Coordinates: 45°46′17″N 3°14′22″E
- Country: France
- Region: Auvergne-Rhône-Alpes
- Department: Puy-de-Dôme
- Arrondissement: Clermont-Ferrand
- Canton: Pont-du-Château
- Commune: Mur-sur-Allier
- Area^{1}: 6.67 km^{2} (2.58 sq mi)
- Elevation: 320 m (1,050 ft)
- Highest elevation: 603 m (1,978 ft)
- Lowest elevation: 305 m (1,001 ft)
- Population (2022): 1,161
  - Density: 174/km^{2} (451/sq mi)
- Time zone: UTC+01:00 (CET)
  - Summer (DST): UTC+02:00 (CEST)
- Postal code: 63111
- ^{1} French Land Register data, which excludes lakes, ponds, glaciers > 1 km^{2} (0.386 sq mi or 247 acres) and river estuaries.

Dallet (French pronunciation: [dalɛ]) is a former commune in the Puy-de-Dôme department in Auvergne in central France. On 1 January 2019, it was merged with Mezel into the new commune Mur-sur-Allier.

== See also ==
- Communes of the Puy-de-Dôme department
