= Clet =

Clet is a French surname. Notable people with the surname include:

- Antoine Clet (1705–1785), French printer, publisher, and writer
- Francis Regis Clet (1748–1820), martyr saint of China

== See also ==
- Saint-Clet (disambiguation)
