= Saint-Alyre-ès-Montagne =

- Commune
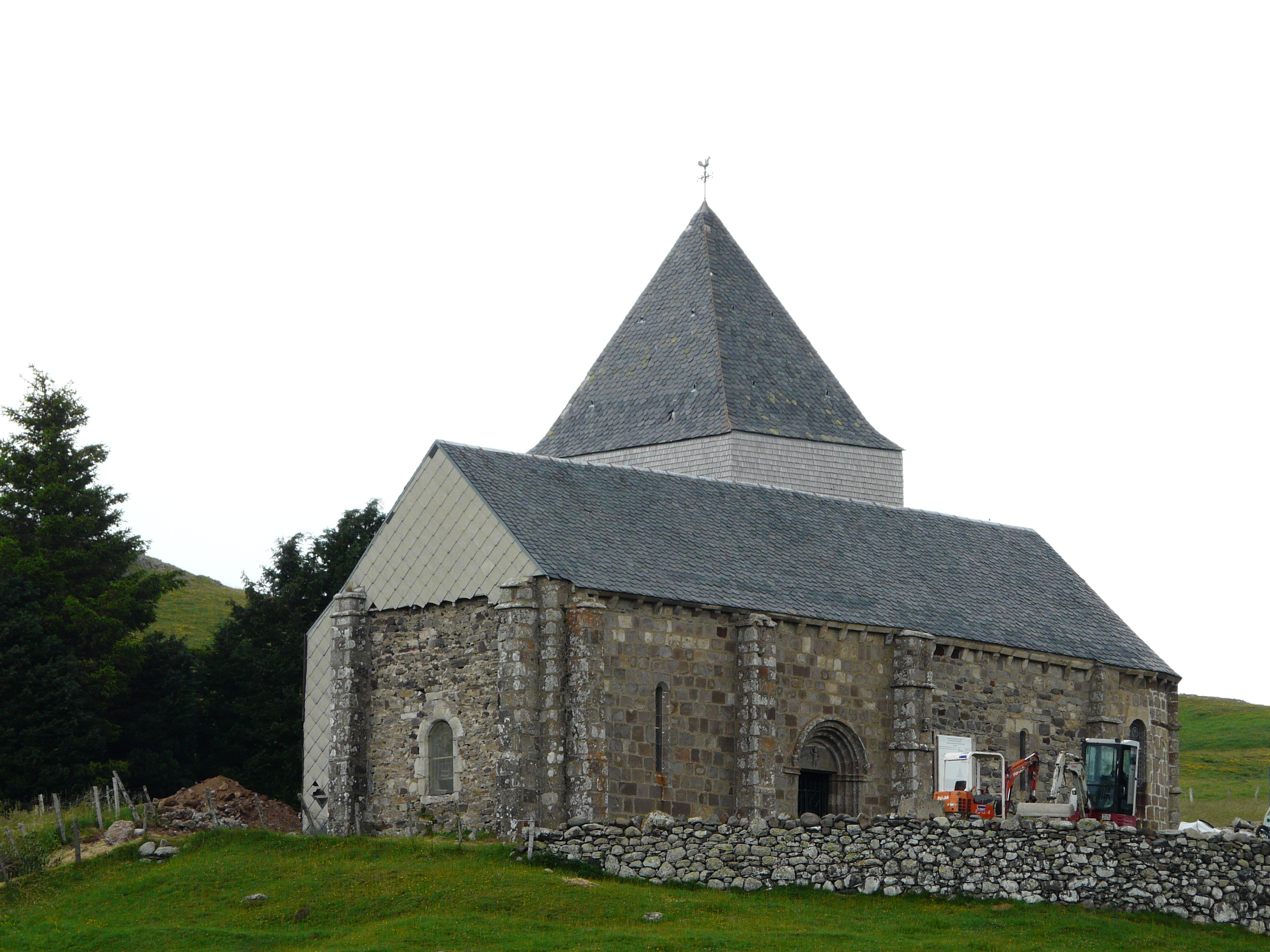
- The church in Saint-Alyre-ès-Montagne

- Coat of arms
- Location of Saint-Alyre-ès-Montagne
- Location within France Location within Auvergne-Rhône-Alpes
- Coordinates: 45°23′24″N 2°59′35″E
- Country: France
- Region: Auvergne-Rhône-Alpes
- Department: Puy-de-Dôme
- Arrondissement: Issoire
- Canton: Brassac-les-Mines
- Intercommunality: Agglo Pays d'Issoire

Government
  - Mayor (2020–2026): Guy Goyon
- Area^{1}: 41.07 km^{2} (15.86 sq mi)
- Elevation: 1,140 m (3,740 ft)
- Highest elevation: 1,462 m (4,797 ft)
- Lowest elevation: 890 m (2,920 ft)
- Population (2023): 102
  - Density: 2.48/km^{2} (6.43/sq mi)
- Time zone: UTC+01:00 (CET)
  - Summer (DST): UTC+02:00 (CEST)
- INSEE/Postal code: 63313 /63420
- ^{1} French Land Register data, which excludes lakes, ponds, glaciers > 1 km^{2} (0.386 sq mi or 247 acres) and river estuaries.

Saint-Alyre-ès-Montagne (French pronunciation: [sɛ̃.t‿aliʁ ɛs mɔ̃taɲ]; Auvergnat: Sent Alire de la Montanha) is a commune in the Puy-de-Dôme department in Auvergne in central France.

== See also ==
- Communes of the Puy-de-Dôme department
