= Pont-du-Château =

Pont-du-Château Pont dau Chastèl (Occitan)
- Commune
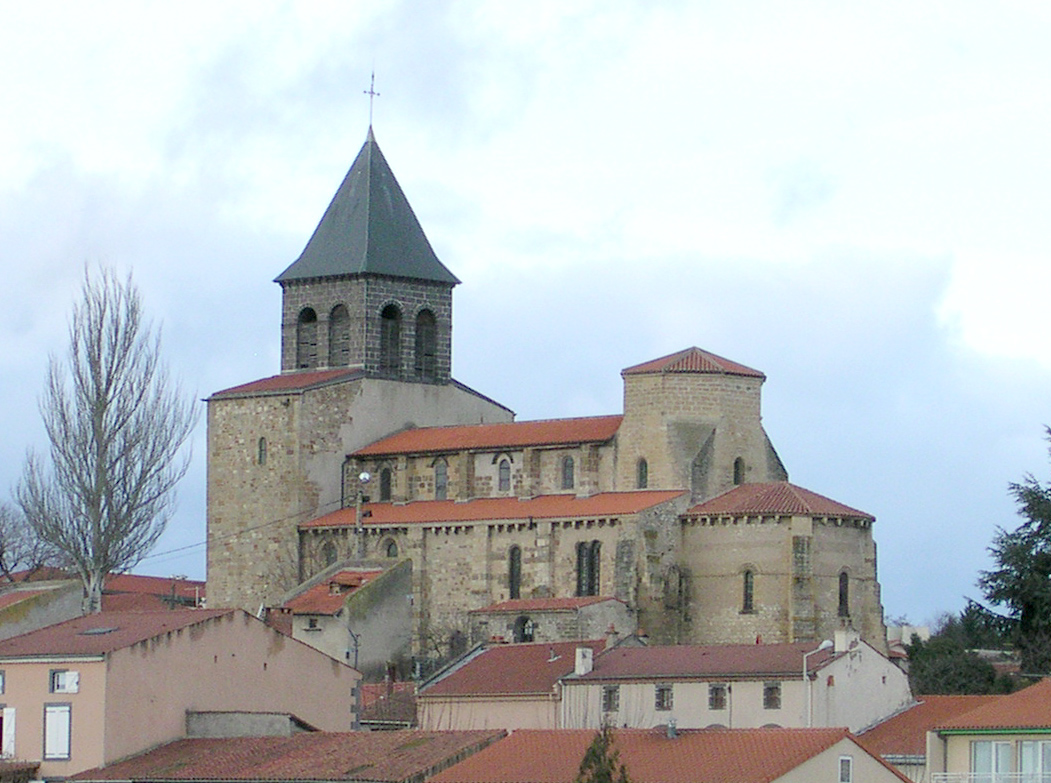
- The church of Pont-du-Château

- Coat of arms
- Location of Pont-du-Château
- Location within France Location within Auvergne-Rhône-Alpes
- Coordinates: 45°47′57″N 3°14′57″E
- Country: France
- Region: Auvergne-Rhône-Alpes
- Department: Puy-de-Dôme
- Arrondissement: Clermont-Ferrand
- Canton: Pont-du-Château
- Intercommunality: Clermont Auvergne Métropole

Government
  - Mayor (2020–2026): Patrick Perrin
- Area^{1}: 21.61 km^{2} (8.34 sq mi)
- Elevation: 328 m (1,076 ft)
- Highest elevation: 380 m (1,250 ft)
- Lowest elevation: 291 m (955 ft)
- Population (2023): 12,412
  - Density: 574.4/km^{2} (1,488/sq mi)
- Time zone: UTC+01:00 (CET)
  - Summer (DST): UTC+02:00 (CEST)
- INSEE/Postal code: 63284 /63430
- ^{1} French Land Register data, which excludes lakes, ponds, glaciers > 1 km^{2} (0.386 sq mi or 247 acres) and river estuaries.

Pont-du-Château (French: [pɔ̃ dy ʃɑto]; Auvergnat: Pont dau Chastèl; literally 'Bridge of the Castle') is a commune in the Puy-de-Dôme department in Auvergne-Rhône-Alpes in central France.

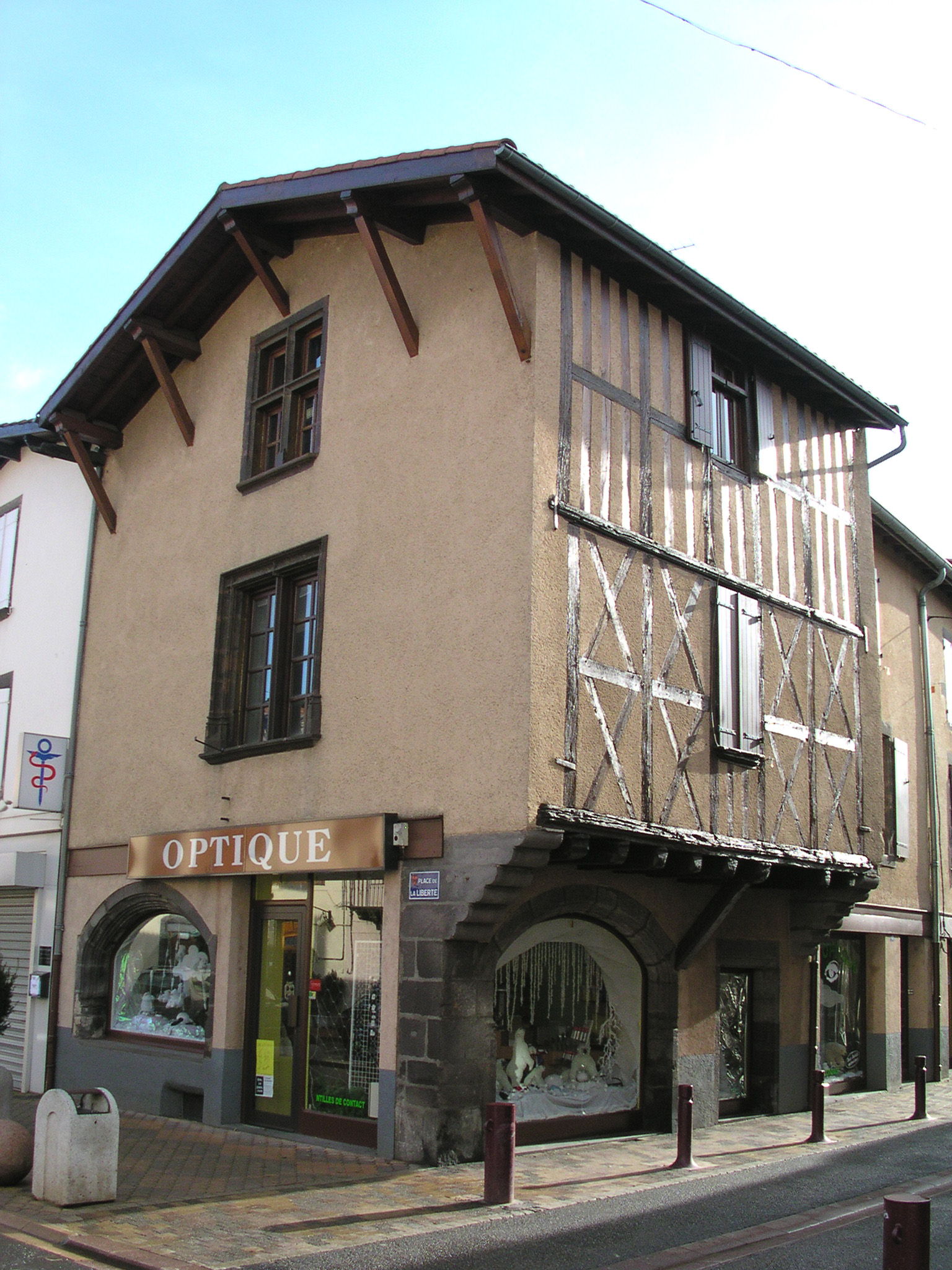
A house in the centre of Pont-du-Château.

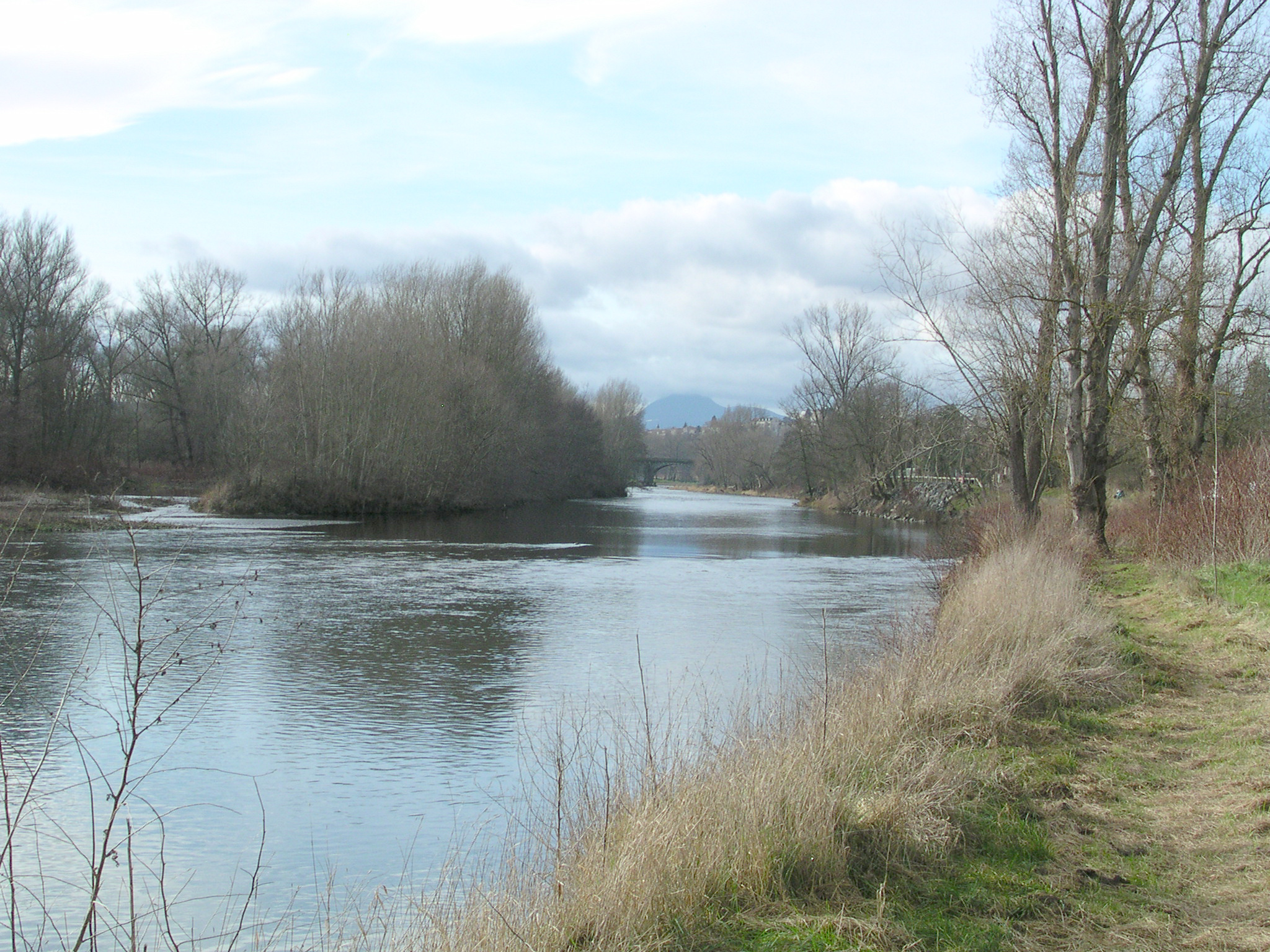
Allier river near Pont-du-Chateau

== Geography ==
Located 15 km from Clermont-Ferrand (15 minutes by car), Pont-du-Château lies at the crossroad of motorways connecting Paris to Barcelona and Lyon to Bordeaux. Pont-du-Château joined the Clermont commune on 1 January 2004. Since then, Pont-du-Château has had a large territory of more than 30,000 square meters and 283,000 inhabitants.

== Sights ==
- The castle: Burned in 1580 following an epidemic of plague, the castle was rebuilt in the middle of the 17th century on the initiative of Guillaume de Montboissier Beaufort-Canillac, with financial help from his friend Cardinal Mazarin.
- Museum: place de l'Aire. The museum recalls the life of boatmen and other Castelpontins, through many objects, models and documents. The museum is open every day in July and August.

== History ==
=== Origins ===
Three boroughs were born in Carolingian times, although precise dates are uncertain.

- In the west, Paulhat: during the Roman peace large Gallo-Roman farms existed in the large marsh known as Limagne, Redon, Picou, Tourette Chazal, but in the Carolingian era the village of Paulhat grew at the foot of the cliffs of Littes and Ruchon
- The village of Machal beneath the Puy de Mur volcano, dating from the Paleolithic era, disappeared during the Norman invasions. But the Sainte Martine church appeared on the fortified hillock, surrounded by a village whose activities related to the river Allier.
- In a period frequently troubled by Viking incursions, a stone keep appeared on the riverside cliffs. Louis Le Gros laid siege to it in 1122 and destroyed it.

=== Medieval city ===
Guy de Dampierre seized the town in 1212 on behalf of Philip II of France, which made the city a Crown possession. In the 13th century it became a true citadel the "old castle" enclosed by a single wall. Philippe Auguste made it a garrison city, equipping it with two new walls with towers, doors, ramparts which one guesses in the plan of the old city.

Two churches enriched this inheritance:

- Ste Martine, a Romanesque building built over several centuries beginning in the 13th century, since restored with its original paintings;
- Notre Dame de Paulhat, which disappeared from the marsh about 1356 and was rebuilt west of the fortifications in 1384, and again destroyed. In the 16th century, with the Renaissance, it saw a resurgence of Auvergnat Romanesque architecture.

=== Traditional city ===
Since the old castle had been destroyed in a fire, Guillaume de Montboissier Beaufort-Canilhac, lieutenant general of the Army of Italy built the current castle in 1654 with financial help from his friend Mazarin, on his return to Auvergne covered with honors by Louis XIV. Facing the Allier valley, the castle is in late Louis XIII and early Louis XIV architectural style, with its northern frontage crowned by a terrace and its broad southern terrace overlooking French gardens.

=== 18th century ===
Philippe-Claude de Montboissier Beaufort-Canilhac after 1750 undertook major renovations to the castle: vast stables to the west, sculptures and facings of Volvic stone on the northern frontage of the principal masonry and interior decoration with woodwork and ceiling paintings in the French style, for example.

In the same time period, between 1765 and 1773, Mr. de Régemorte designed a new stone bridge, which built Raimbaux father and wire, a bridge that to this day remains indestructible in spite of the significant floods of the Allier, and which made possible the royal road 89 between Lyon and Bordeaux. For nearly 150 years people had crossed the river on a ferry.

=== 19th century ===
Pont-du-Château had five ports: Vortille, Palisses, Bouères, Borde St Aventin and Port d'Amont, the only port built on the Allier between Brioude and Moulins. Several factors contributed to the develpoment of river navigation, including the opening of the Briare Canal in 1642, the disappearance of the pélières in 1790, coal mining in Brassac, and the demand for fir trees to supply timber for the masts of Louis XIV's fleet. Other goods transported along the river included wine, which was popular in Paris; hemp used for the rigging of sailing ships; paper produced in Auvergne; and Volvic stone, ehich was sought after by architects. More than 3000 rafts of fir trees travelled down the Allier each year, reflecting the considerable, growth of the river transport. However, the arrival of the railway in 1865 led to the decline of inland navigation.

== Population ==
Historical population
Year	Pop.	±% p.a.
1968	4,605	—
1975	5,574	+2.77%
1982	7,683	+4.69%
1990	8,562	+1.36%
1999	8,874	+0.40%
2007	10,274	+1.85%
2012	10,541	+0.51%
2017	11,441	+1.65%
2023	12,412	+1.37%
Source: INSEE

== Transportation ==
- Plane: Ten minutes from the Clermont-Auvergne airport. Twenty French cities are served daily including six flights daily for Paris, four to Orly and two to Charles de Gaulle. There are also flights to four European cities: Amsterdam, Geneva, Milan and Turin.
- Train: at Clermont-Ferrand eight trains go to Paris daily (and one nightly). Daily connections go to Lyon and Marseille. The SNCF makes it possible to travel from Pont-du-Château to Clermont-Ferrand in eight minutes.
- Bus: Member of Clermont the Community, the commune integrates the Perimeter of the Urban transport, the service road drunk is thus accessible with a transport document T2C. The various tariffs and schedules are accessible on

Pont-du-Château is at the crossroads of the regional parks of Auvergne. A few minutes away by car lies the regional natural reserves of the Volcanos of Auvergne and of Livradois-Drill.

== Partner cities ==
- Sainte-Marie, Quebec, Canada

== See also ==
- Communes of the Puy-de-Dôme department
