= Gardiol language =

Variety of the Occitan language

Gardiol
- Occitan Gardiol, Guardiol
- Gardiòl
- Native to: Italy
- Region: Guardia Piemontese
- Native speakers: 340 (2007)
- Language family: Indo-European: Italic; Latino-Faliscan; Latin; Romance; Italo-Western; Western Romance; Gallo-Iberian?; (disputed); Occitano-Romance?; Occitan; Provençal?; Vivaro-Alpine; Eastern; Cisalpine; Gardiol

Language codes
- ISO 639-3: –
- Glottolog: gard1245
- ELP: Gardiol
- Guardia Piemontese in Calabria, the place where Gardiol is spoken

- Gardiol is classified as Severely Endangered by the UNESCO Atlas of the World's Languages in Danger.

Gardiol (Occitan: Gardiòl) is the variety of Occitan still spoken today in Guardia Piemontese, Calabria.

UNESCO classifies it as "seriously in danger" of disappearing in its Atlas of the World's Languages in Danger. But on the contrary, Agostino Formica showed in 1999 that Gardiol Occitan was still surviving despite the small number of speakers. Similarly, Pietro Monteleone stressed that Gardiol remained the language in common use in family and friendly relations.

Gardiol is of North Occitan origin. The population of Guardia Piemontese arrived from the Occitan Valleys of Piedmont in the 14th century, following the persecutions against the Waldensians. It is therefore related to the Vivaro-Alpine. However, Glottolog recognizes Gardiol as a distinct language within the Occitanic language family.

== Population ==
In 2007, according to the linguist Fiorenzo Toso, there are 340 Gardiol speakers out of 1,860 inhabitants, the others using either standard Italian or Calabrian. This is different to both Christopher Moseley, which said there were around 300 speakers (2005) and Agostino Formica, which said there were around 370 speakers (1999).

== Example text ==
The following is a text taken from a manual by G. Ligozat.

Guardiolo

A La Gàrdia l'antica pòrta granda (pòrta dal sang) ilh recòrda fait brut, fòrse, en part, inventat. Un fait dei mai brut al vai sochèd 'o 11 de junh 1561 a Montalto Uffungo aont otanta-uèch Valdés ilh van èsser massat a chavon dal schalier de la guieisa de Sant Fransisc de Paola.

Un testimone al vai scriu dins una letra 'o fait brut: 'o bòia, stachaa una faissa sus lhi uèlh dal condamnat, ab 'o cotèll al lhi talha 'o gargaròt, al lhi cacha la faissa, e ainan un autre.

'O deman ilh van talha lhi cadàver, ilh lhi van tapa sus lhi carre e ilh lhi van empinge sus lhi arbre, per mai ò mens trenta-shèis milhe long la straa per Castrovillari. 'O 28 de junh, sus la plaça de Cosenza, lhi autre Valdés ilh van èsser cuvèrt de piche e iars coma tòrche. Gabriele Pepe, dins Il Ponte – setembre/otróeve 1950, al a pas dóbie: « La vai èsser una crochata vèra, ab tot lhi mal de le crochate: destruccion de país entíer, fúec, massacre col·lectiu, impicajon, confiscacion, vinhe destrote. » En tot 2000 Valdés de La Gàrdia, Montalto Uffugo e San Sisto ilh van èsser massat; 1600 ilh van èsser empresonat ò mandat sus le galère.

Translation:
English

At La Gàrdia, the ancient grand gate (the gate of blood) recalls a horrific event, perhaps partly invented. One of the most horrific events took place on June 11, 1561, in Montalto Uffugo, where eighty-eight Waldensians were massacred at the foot of the staircase of the church of Saint Francis of Paola.

A witness wrote in a letter about the atrocity: the executioner, having tied a blindfold over the condemned man's eyes, cut his throat with a knife, then removed the blindfold, and moved on to the next one.

The following day the corpses were cut up, loaded onto carts, and hung from trees for more or less thirty-six miles along the road to Castrovillari. On June 28th, in the square of Cosenza, the remaining Waldensians were covered in pitch and burned like torches. Gabriele Pepe, in Il Ponte – September/October 1950, had no doubts: "It was a true crusade, with all the evils of crusades: destruction of entire villages, fire, mass massacre, hangings, confiscations, vineyards laid waste." In total, 2,000 Waldensians from La Gàrdia, Montalto Uffugo, and San Sisto were massacred; 1,600 were imprisoned or sent to the galleys.

== Language reform ==
If the Gardiols have always known that their language came from the Vaud Valleys of Piedmont, the Occitans of Piedmont took a long time to realize that their language was part of the whole of oc. Since the 1970s, the name Occitan has spread in the Occitan Valleys . This name was probably introduced to Guardia Piemontese by Arturo Genre, who also introduced the spelling of the Escolo dòu Po (whose principle is to note all the dialects with their local particularities). Hans-Peter Kunert, a German Romance scholar, developed the adaptation to Gardiol of the classical spelling of Occitan, which makes Gardiol readable outside Guardia despite the particularities that make spoken Gardiol difficult to understand for an Occitan from France. This has allowed the development of school materials as well as a Gardiol-Italian dictionary.

== Comparison to other languages ==
English	Latin	Portuguese	Spanish	French	Catalan	North Occitan	Gardiol	Sardinian	Italian	Friulian	Ladin (Nones)	Romanian
key	clavis (clavis)	chave	llave/clave	clef/clé	clau	clau/clhau	quiau	crae/crai	chiave	clâf	clau	cheie
night	nox (noctis)	noite	noche	nuit	nit	nueit/nuech	nuèit	notte/notti	notte	gnot	not	noapte
sing	cantare	cantar	cantar	chanter	cantar	chantar	chantar	cantare/cantai	cantare	cjantâ	ciantar	cânta
goat	capra (caprae)	cabra	cabra	chèvre	cabra	chabra	chabra	cabra/craba	capra	cjavre	ciaura	capră
language	lingua (linguae)	língua	lengua	langue	llengua	lenga	lenga	limba/lingua	lingua	lenghe	lenga	limbă
square	platea (plateae)	praça	plaza	place	plaça	plaça/plhaça	piaça	pratha/pratza	piazza	place	plaza	piaţă
bridge	pons (pontis)	ponte	puente	pont	pont	pònt/pont	pònt	ponte/ponti	ponte	puint	pònt	punte
church	ecclesia (eclessiae)	igreja	iglesia	église	església	gleia/gleisa	guieisa	creja/cresia	chiesa	glesie	glesia	biserică
cheese	caseus	queijo	queso	fromage	formatge	formatge/fromatge	case	casu	formaggio/cacio	formadi	formai	brânză/caş

== See also ==
- Occitan conjugation
- Baìo
