= North Occitan =

- nòrd-occitan
- Native to: France, Italy
- Language family: Indo-European: Italic; Latino-Faliscan; Latin; Romance; Italo-Western; Western Romance; Gallo-Iberian; Gallo-Romance (Note: Some Iberian scholars may alternatively classify Occitan as Iberian Romance.); Occitano-Romance; Occitan; North Occitan
- Dialects: Auvergnat; Limousin; Vivaro-Alpine ?

Language codes
- ISO 639-3: –
- Glottolog: nort2608
- Linguasphere: 51-AAA-g
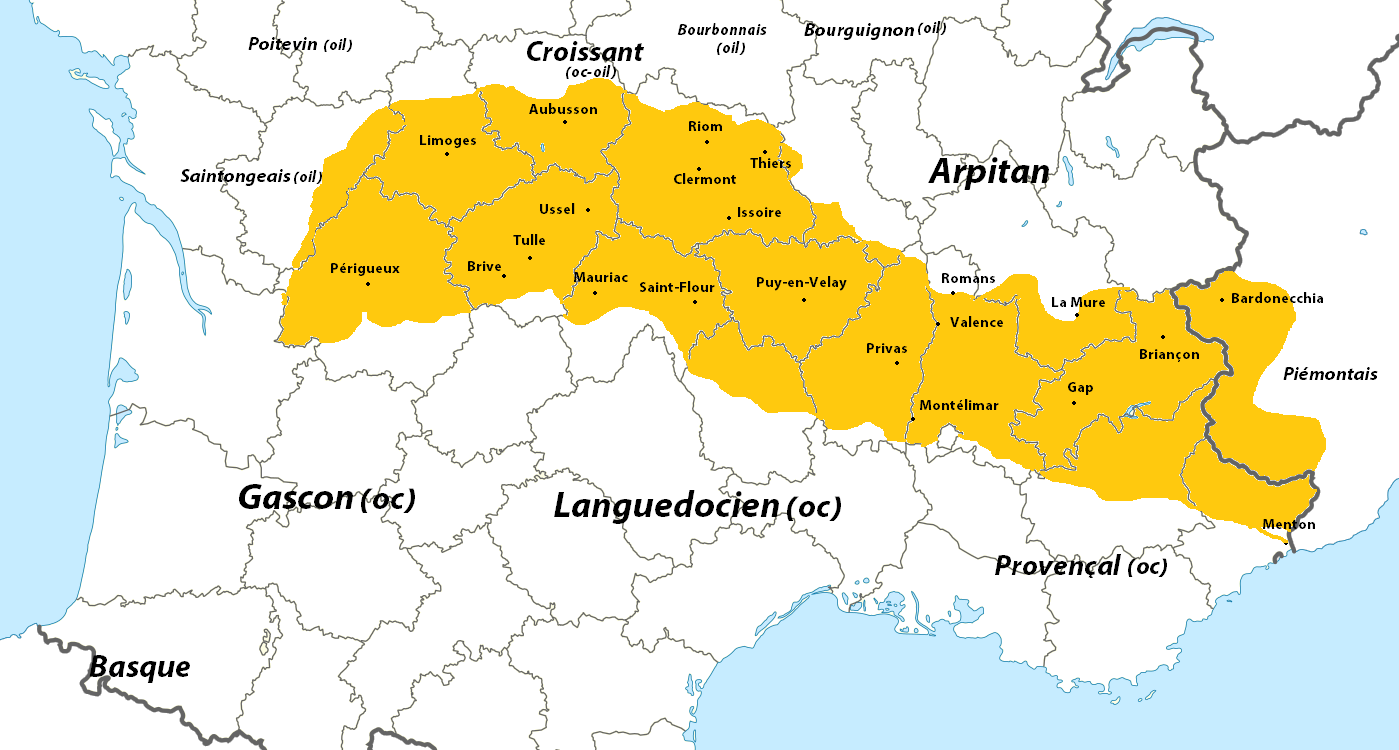
- Linguistics area of North Occitan (excluding the languages of the “Croissant” zone) according to l'Atlas sonore des langues régionales (CNRS, 2022).

North Occitan is a dialect classification of the Occitan language.

It is considered as either one unified dialect, or as a subdivided supra-dialectal grouping which comprises smaller North Occitan dialects (Auvergnat, Limousin and Vivaro-Alpine).

It is spoken in an area which extends from Limousin and Eastern Charente in the west up until the Occitan Valleys of Piedmont in the east, encompassing Auvergne and Dauphiné, and the Mentonasc region in the south-east. It also includes a former Waldensian colony in Calabria, Guardia Piemontese.

== Phonology ==
North Occitan phonetics are notably distinguished from those of other Occitan dialects, by the palatalisation of the Latin ca and ga into cha and ja.

== Variation ==
=== Internal classification ===
North Occitan is sometimes split into three sub-groups, knows as Auvergnat, Limousin and Vivaro-Alpine.

Transitional dialects are not normally categorised within this group.

=== Dialect or Language ===
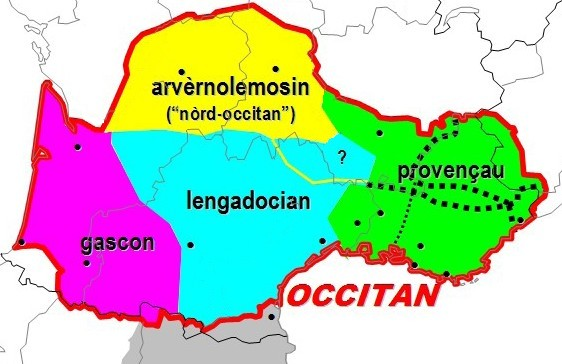
Linguistic division of Occitan according to Jacques Allières. Here, North Occitan corresponds exclusively to the Arverno-Limousin group.

Many linguists such as Henri Guiter, Jules Ronjat and Jacques Allières, argue that there is one unified North Occitan dialect - specifically that Auvergnat and Limousin should not be separated. Jacques Allières uses the term North Occitan exclusively for the Averno-Limousin grouping, whereas he considers Vivaro-Alpine to be a variant of Provençal.

Terms derived from the names of the regions are, in reality, arbitrary divisions to provide geographical framework for local dialectal variations. Thus Jean Roux, like Roger Teulat, argues with regard to Auvergnat that "this term is used as a simplification, for under no circumstances can Auvergnat be considered an autonomous linguistic entity."

== See also ==
- Languages of France
- Association internationale d'études occitanes
- Language policy in France
