= Saint-Clet =

Saint-Clet may refer to:

- Saint-Clet, Côtes-d'Armor, Brittany, France
- Saint-Clet, Quebec, Canada

== See also ==
- Clet, a surname
- Pope Anacletus (died c. 92), also known as Saint Cletus
