= Boecis =

The Boecis (original name: Lo poema de Boecis, Occitan: [lu puˈɛmɒ ðe βuˈesis], Catalan: [lu puˈɛmə ðə βuˈesis]; "The poem of Boethius") is an anonymous fragment written around the year 1000 CE in the Limousin dialect of Old Occitan, currently spoken only in southern France. Of the hundreds or possibly thousands of original lines, only 257 are now known.

This poem was inspired by the work De consolatione philosophiae of the Latin poet, philosopher and politician Boethius (~480-524).

== Fragments ==
Laisses 23 to 28:

XXIII

Cum jaz Boecis e pena, charceraz,
Plan se sos dols e sos menuz pecaz,
D'una donzella fo laïnz visitaz:
Filla·s al rei qui a granz poestaz.
Ella·ta bella, reluzent lo palaz.
Lo mas o intra, inz es granz claritaz;
Ja no es obs fox i sia alumnaz:
Veder pot l'om per quaranta ciptaz.
Qual ora·s vol, petitas fai asaz;
Cum ella s'auça, cel a del cap polsat;
Quant be se dreça lo cel a pertusat,
E ve laïnz tota la majestat.

XXIV

Bella·s la donna e·l vis a ta preclar,
Davan so vis nulz om no·s pot celar;
Ne eps li omne qui sun ultra la mar
No potden tant e lor cors cobetar
Qu'ella de tot no vea lor pessar.
Qui·e leis se fia, morz no l'es a doptar.

XXV

Bella·s la donna, mas molt es de longs dis,
No·s pot rascundre nulz om denant so vis.
Hanc no vist omne, ta grant onor aguís,
Si·l forfez tan dont ella·s rangurís,
Sos corps ni s'arma miga per ren guarís;
Quoras que·s vol s'en a lo corps aucís
E pois met l'arma en effern e somsís:
Tal li comanda qui totz dias la bris.
Ella metesma ten claus de paradís,
Quoras que·s vol, laïnz col sos amigs.
Bels sun si drap, no sai nommar lo fil,
Mas molt per foren de bon e de sobtil.
Ella se·ls fez, avia anz plus de mil.
Ta no son vel, miga lor prez avil.

XXVII

Ella medesma teiset so vestiment
Que negus om no pot desfar neient.
Pur l'una fremna qui vers la terra pent
Non comprarias ab mil liuras d'argent.
Ella ab Boeci parlet ta dolzament:
«Molt me derramen donzellet de jovent,
Que zo esperen que faza a lor talen.
Primas me amen, pois me van aïssent;
La mi'amor ta mal van deperden».

XXVIII

Bel sun li drap que la domn'a vestit;
De caritat e de fe sun bastit.
I sun ta bel, ta blanc e ta quandid,
Tant a Boecis lo vis esvanuit
Que el zo pensa: uel sien amosit.
