= Mur-sur-Allier =

- Commune
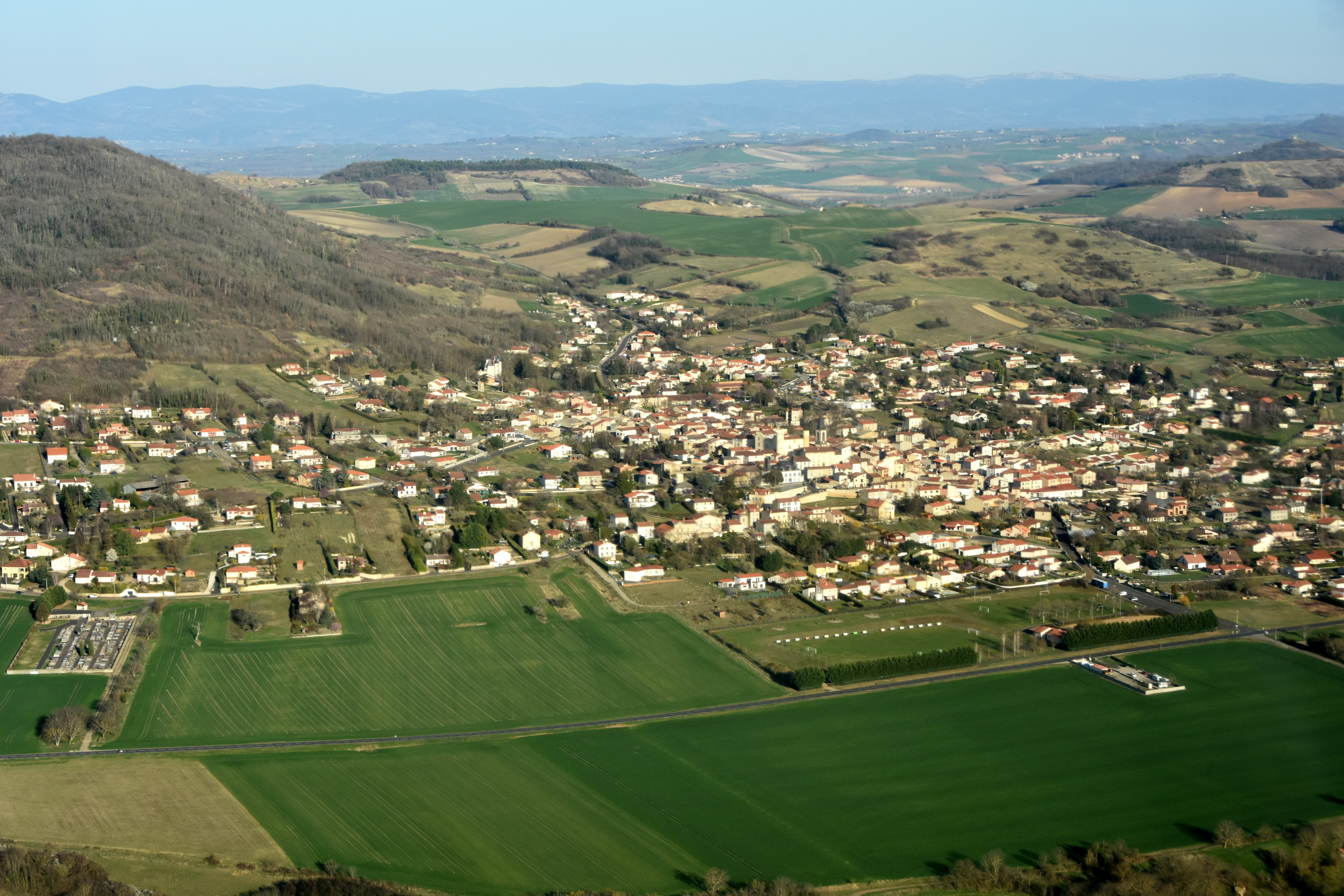
- A general view of Mur-sur-Allier
- Location of Mur-sur-Allier
- Location within France Location within Auvergne-Rhône-Alpes
- Coordinates: 45°45′21″N 3°14′35″E
- Country: France
- Region: Auvergne-Rhône-Alpes
- Department: Puy-de-Dôme
- Arrondissement: Clermont-Ferrand
- Canton: Pont-du-Château
- Intercommunality: Billom Communauté

Government
  - Mayor (2020–2026): Jean Delaugerre
- Area^{1}: 15.07 km^{2} (5.82 sq mi)
- Highest elevation: 603 m (1,978 ft)
- Lowest elevation: 305 m (1,001 ft)
- Population (2023): 3,111
  - Density: 206.4/km^{2} (534.7/sq mi)
- Time zone: UTC+01:00 (CET)
  - Summer (DST): UTC+02:00 (CEST)
- INSEE/Postal code: 63226 /63115
- ^{1} French Land Register data, which excludes lakes, ponds, glaciers > 1 km^{2} (0.386 sq mi or 247 acres) and river estuaries.

Mur-sur-Allier (French pronunciation: [myʁ syʁ alje], literally Mur on Allier) is a commune in the Puy-de-Dôme department in Auvergne in central France. It was established on 1 January 2019 by merger of the former communes of Mezel (the seat) and Dallet.

== Population ==
Population data refer to the area corresponding with the commune as of January 2025.

Historical population
Year	Pop.	±% p.a.
1968	1,564	—
1975	1,716	+1.33%
1982	2,007	+2.26%
1990	2,365	+2.07%
1999	2,524	+0.73%
2007	3,063	+2.45%
2012	3,333	+1.70%
2017	3,412	+0.47%
2023	3,111	−1.53%
Source: INSEE

== See also ==
- Communes of the Puy-de-Dôme department
