= Aquitaine-Pyrenean dialects =

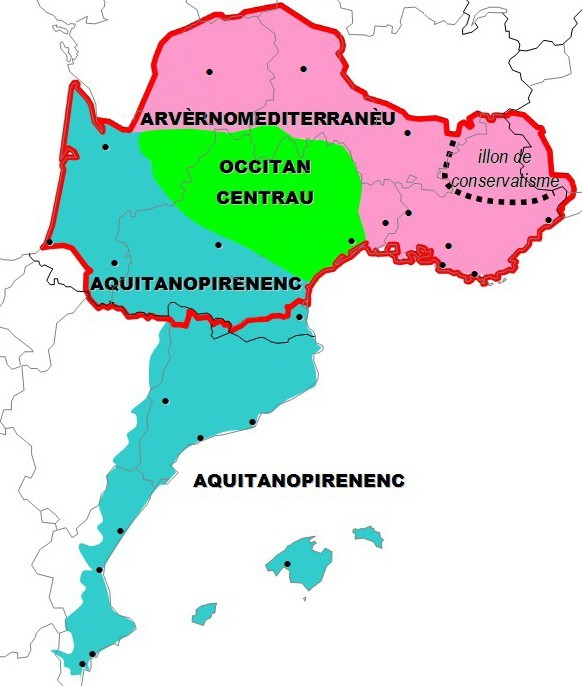
Supra-dialectal classification of the Occitano-Romance languages. Aquitaine-Pyrenean (in the south) is in blue.

Aquitaine-Pyrenean (aquitanopirenenc in Occitan) refers to a supra-dialectal classification of the Occitano-Romance languages, defined by Pierre Bec. Aquitaine-Pyrenean includes the Gascon dialect, Languedocian dialect and Catalan language.
