= Canton of Pont-du-Château =

Coordinates: 45.80°N 3.25°E

The canton of Pont-du-Château is an administrative division of the Puy-de-Dôme department, central France. Its borders were modified at the French canton reorganisation which came into effect in March 2015. Its seat is in Pont-du-Château.

It consists of the following communes:

1. Lempdes
2. Mur-sur-Allier
3. Pont-du-Château
