= Antoine Clet =

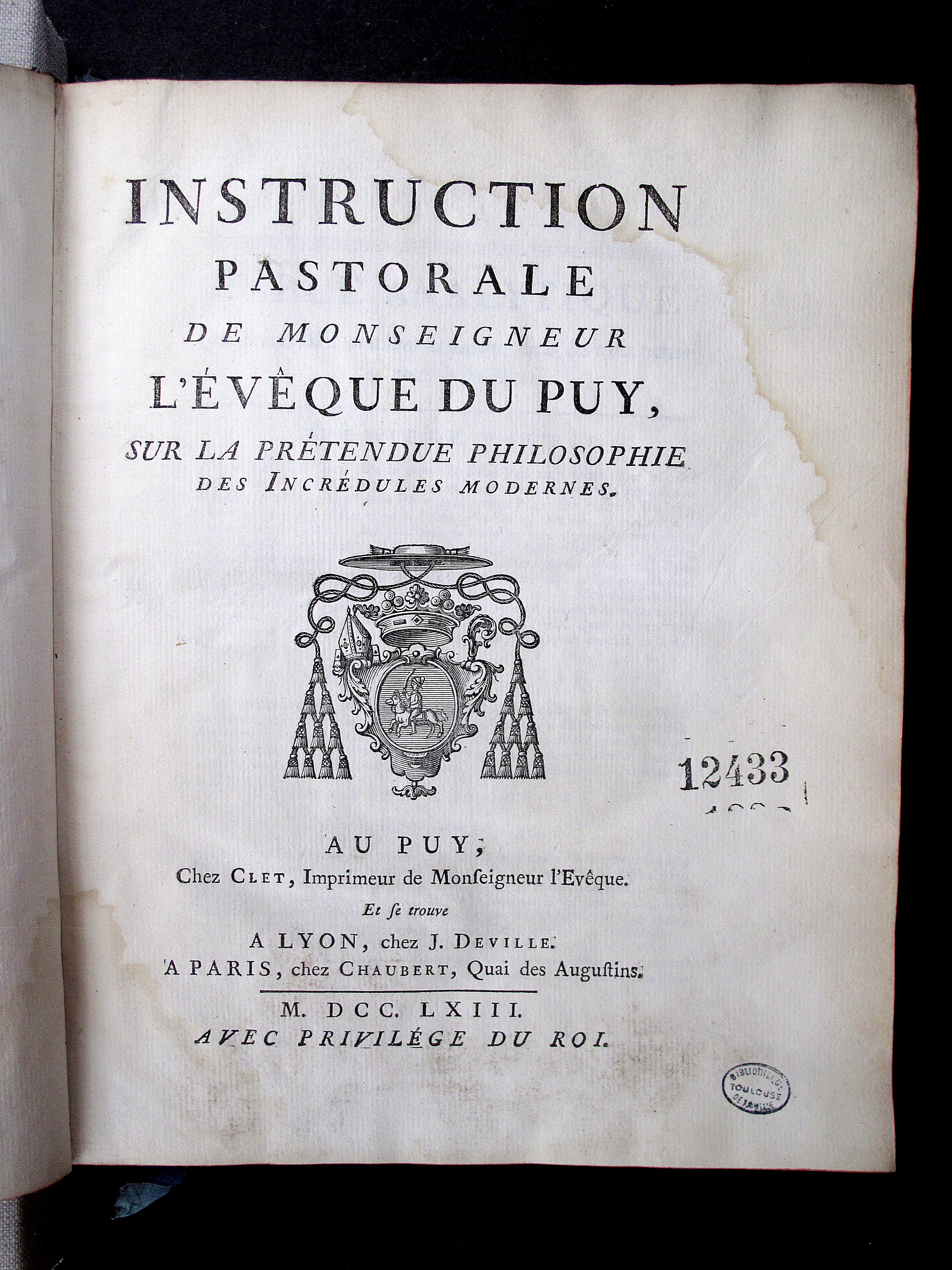
- The Pastoral Instruction from Lefranc de Pompignan, published by Clet in 1763, was "highly respected" according to Bachaumont but mocked by Voltaire in Letter to a quaker (Fac 4610(1) BM Toulouse)
- Born: 17 July 1705; Le Puy en Velay, Velay, Kingdom of France
- Died: 22 November 1785 (aged 80); Le Puy en Velay, Velay, Kingdom of France
- Occupations: printer, publisher, bookseller, writer

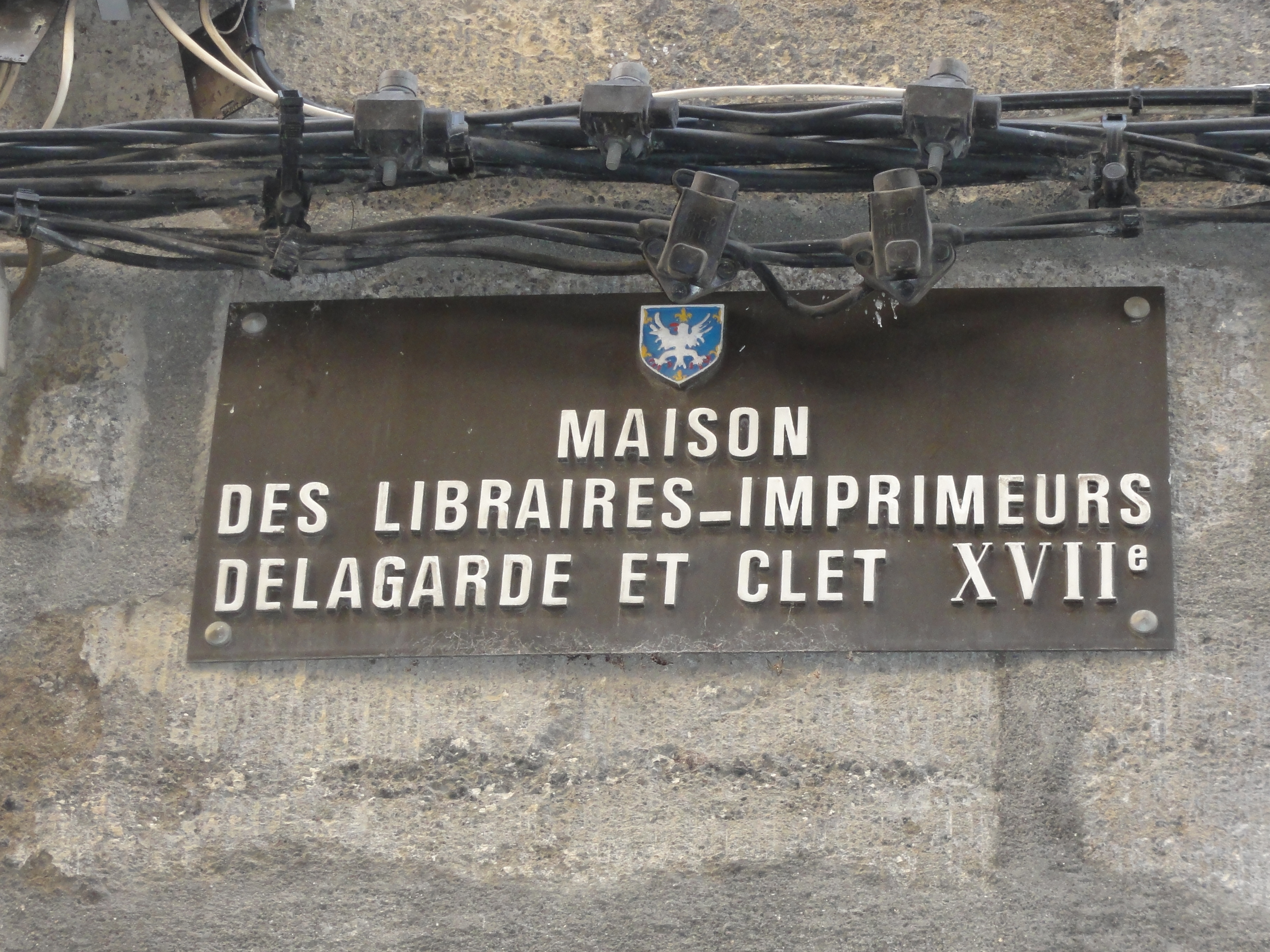
Plaque on the house of the printer Clet in Le Puy en Velay

Antoine Clet (1705–1785) was a French printer, publisher and writer of the 18th century.

== Early life ==
Clet's father came from Dresden and settled in Le Puy at the end of the 17th century to become a printer's assistant. He published local edits and printed the local edition of the French cour "La Gazette". He was also the main printer of the books of Jean Georges Lefranc de Pompignan, bishop of Le Puy.

== Career ==
Clet was established in Le Puy-en-Velay and was awarded the title of "king's printer" by Louis XV in 1751. This title recognizes a prominent skill in the art of printing and allows the nearly exclusive right to release the royal decrees (fr:Imprimeur du roi).

Clet is also known as a satirist and writer: his production was huge but only three comedies are saved: The missed sermon (Le sermon manqué-1749), Monsieur Lambert (1751), le Borgne (the one-eyed and the Musketeers). The two first are in a mix of French and Occitan. These comedies provide snapshots of the mid-18th century life in a town of France far from Versailles: people, language, mind-set, centre of interests. They use satire, innuendo and humour. It was a risky business to create these satirical comedies as a "king's printer" had to show a good behaviour and religious feelings, which might explain why he never printed his opus. They were released in Le Puy in the mid 19th century by one of his descendants.

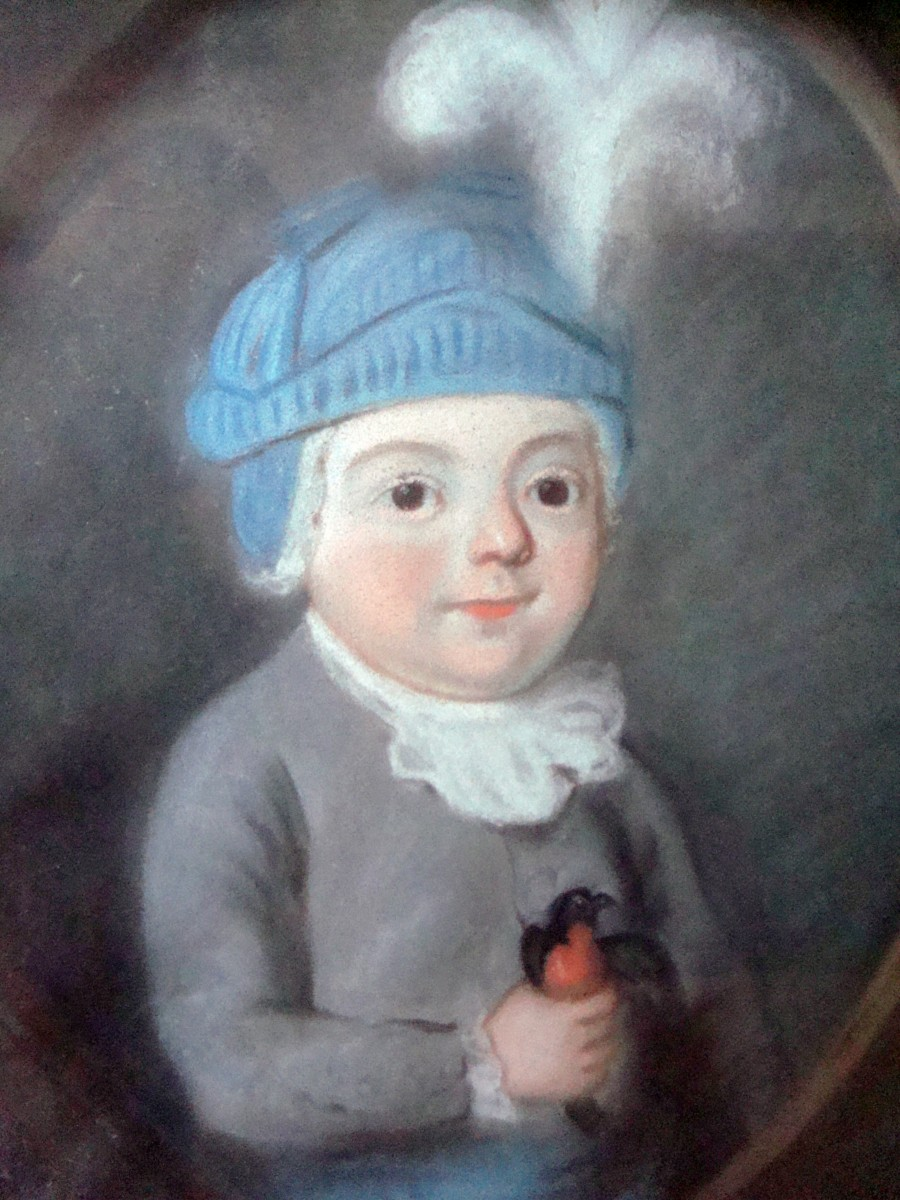
Portrait said to be "The poet Clet as a child", circa 1710, Musée Crozatier, Le Puy-en-Velay

== Legacy ==
A street of Le Puy-en-Velay has been named for Clet since 1889.
