= Limousin dialect =

Occitan dialect of Limousin, France

Limousin
- lemosin
- Native to: France
- Region: Limousin
- Native speakers: (undated figure of 10,000)
- Language family: Indo-European: Italic; Latino-Faliscan; Latin; Romance; Italo-Western; Western Romance; Gallo-Iberian; Gallo-Romance (Note: Some Iberian scholars may alternatively classify Occitan as Iberian Romance.); Occitano-Romance; Occitan; North Occitan; Limousin

Language codes
- ISO 639-3: lms (retired); subsumed in oci
- Glottolog: limo1246
- ELP: Limousin
- Linguasphere: 51-AAA-gj
- IETF: oc-lemosin
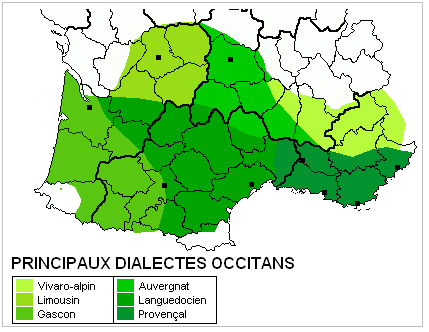
- Approximate distribution of Limousin within the Occitan area

Limousin (French name, pronounced [limuzɛ̃]; Occitan: lemosin, pronounced [lemuˈzi]) is a dialect of the Occitan language, spoken in the three departments of Limousin, parts of Charente and the Dordogne in the southwest of France.

The first Occitan documents are in an early form of this dialect, particularly the Boecis, written around the year 1000.

Limousin is used primarily by people over age 50 in rural communities. All speakers speak French as a first or second language. Due to the French single language policy, it is not recognised by the government and therefore considered endangered by the linguistic community. A revivalist movement around the Félibrige and the Institut d'Estudis Occitans is active in Limousin (as well as in other parts of Occitania).

== Differences from Languedocien ==
Most speakers and linguists consider Limousin to be a variety of Occitan. For more detailed information on this question, see the section on Occitan dialects and codification.

As a comparison of Limousin and Languedocien in written form, the following reproduces the first article of the Universal Declaration of Human Rights: "All human beings are born free and equal in dignity and rights. They are endowed with reason and conscience and should act towards one another in a spirit of brotherhood."

Limousin	Languedocien
Totas las personas naisson liuras e egalas en dignitat e en drech. Son dotadas de rason e de consciéncia e lor chau agir entre elas emb un esperit de frairesa.	Totes los èssers umans naisson liures e egals en dignitat e en dreches. Son dotats de rason e de consciéncia e se devon comportar los unes amb los autres dins un esperit de fraternitat.

== See also ==
- Occitan conjugation
