= Vivaro-Alpine dialect =

Variety of the Occitan language

Vivaro-Alpine
- vivaroaupenc
- Native to: France, Italy
- Region: Southern France, Occitan Valleys
- Language family: Indo-European: Italic; Latino-Faliscan; Latin; Romance; Italo-Western; Western Romance; Gallo-Iberian?; (disputed); Occitano-Romance?; Occitan; Provençal?; Vivaro-Alpine
- Dialects: Mentonasc; Gardiol

Language codes
- ISO 639-3: –
- Glottolog: viva1235
- ELP: Vivaro-Alpine
- Linguasphere: & 51-AAA-gg 51-AAA-gf & 51-AAA-gg
- IETF: oc-vivaraup
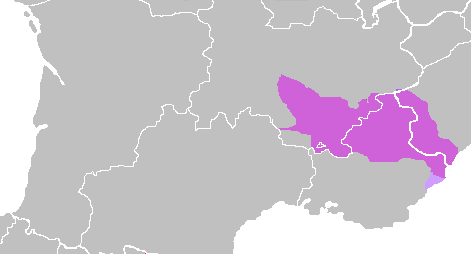
- Map of Vivaro-Alpine dialect

- Vivaro-Alpine is classified as Definitely Endangered by the UNESCO Atlas of the World's Languages in Danger (2010)

Vivaro-Alpine (Occitan: vivaroalpenc, vivaroaupenc; French: vivaro-alpin, pronounced [vivaʁo alpɛ̃]) is a variety of Occitan spoken in southeastern France (namely, around the Dauphiné area) and northwestern Italy (the Occitan Valleys of Piedmont and Liguria). There is also a small Vivaro-Alpine enclave in the Guardia Piemontese, Calabria, where the language is known as Gardiol, which Glottolog recognizes as a distinct language within the Occitanic language family. It belongs to the Northern Occitan dialect bloc, along with Auvergnat and Limousin. The name “vivaro-alpine” was coined by Pierre Bec in the 1970s. The Vivaro-Alpine dialects are traditionally called "gavot" from the Maritime Alps to the Hautes-Alpes.

== Naming and classification ==
Vivaro-Alpine had been considered as a sub-dialect of Provençal, and named provençal alpin (Alpine Provençal) or Northern Provençal.

Its use in the Dauphiné area has also led to the use of dauphinois or dauphinois alpin to name it. Along with Ronjat and Bec, it is now clearly recognized as a dialect of its own.

The UNESCO Atlas of World's languages in danger uses the Alpine Provençal name, and considers it as seriously endangered.

== Subdialects ==
- Western: vivarodaufinenc (native name) or vivaro-dauphinois (French name) near northern Vivarais (Annonay), northeastern Velay (Yssingeaux), a southern fringe of Forez (Saint-Bonnet-le-Château and around Saint-Étienne), Drôme department (Valence, Die, Montélimar) and a fringe in southern Isère department.
- Eastern: Alpine (English name) or alpenc, aupenc (native name), in the Occitan Alps.
  - gavòt (native name) or gavot (French name) in the western Occitan Alps, which are located in France, around Digne, Sisteron, Gap, Barcelonnette and the upper County of Nice.
  - Cisalpine or Eastern Alpine (native names: cisalpenc or alpenc oriental) in the eastern Occitan Alps a.k.a. Occitan Valleys, which are located in Italy (Piedmont and Liguria).

== Characterization ==
Vivaro-Alpine is classified as an Indo-European, Italic, Romance, or Western-Romance language.

Vivaro-Alpine shares the palatization of consonants k and g in front of a with the other varieties of North Occitan (Limosino, Alverniate), in particular with words such as chantar ("cantare", to sing) and jai ("ghiandaia", jay). Southern Occitan has, respectively, cantar and gai.

Its principal characteristic is the dropping of simple Latin dental intervocalics:

- chantaa or chantaia for chantada ("cantata", sung),
- monea for moneda ("moneta", coin),]
- bastia or bastiá for bastida ("imbastitura", tack),
- maür for madur ("maturo", mature).

The verbal ending of the first person is -o (like in Italian, Catalan, Castilian, and Portuguese, but also in Piemontese, which is neighboring): parlo for parli or parle ("io parlo"), parlavo for parlavi or parlave ("io parlavo"), parlèro for parlèri or parlère ("io ho parlato, io parlavo").

A common trait is the rhotacism of l (shift from l to r):

- barma for balma or bauma ("grotta", cave),
- escòra for escòla ("scuola", school),
- saraa or sarai for salada ("insalata", salad).

In the dialects of the Alps, Vivaro-Alpine maintained the pronunciation of the r of the infinitive verbs (excepting modern Occitan).

An estimated 70% of languages are estimated to have "interrogative intonation contours which end with rising pitch." However, Vivaro Alpine follows the opposite pattern with yes/no questions—an initial high tone followed by a fall. Questions that end in a rising pitch are so common that they are often considered "natural." One reason that questions begin with a high tone in some languages is that the listener is immediately being alerted to the fact that they are being asked a question.

== Status ==
Vivaro-Alpine is an endangered language. There are approximately 200,000 native speakers of the language worldwide. Transmission of the language is very low. Speakers of Vivaro-Alpine typically also speak either French or Italian.

== See also ==
- Occitan conjugation
- Baìo
