= Auvergnat =

Occitan dialect of central and southern France

- auvernhat
- Native to: France
- Region: Auvergne, Puy-de-Dôme, Haute-Loire, Allier, Cantal, Communities in Limousin
- Native speakers: 80,000 (2004)
- Language family: Indo-European: Italic; Latino-Faliscan; Latin; Romance; Italo-Western; Western Romance; Gallo-Romance; Occitano-Romance; Occitan; North Occitan; Auvergnat

Language codes
- ISO 639-3: auv (retired); subsumed in oci
- Glottolog: auve1239
- ELP: Auvergnat
- Linguasphere: 51-AAA-gi
- IETF: oc-auvern
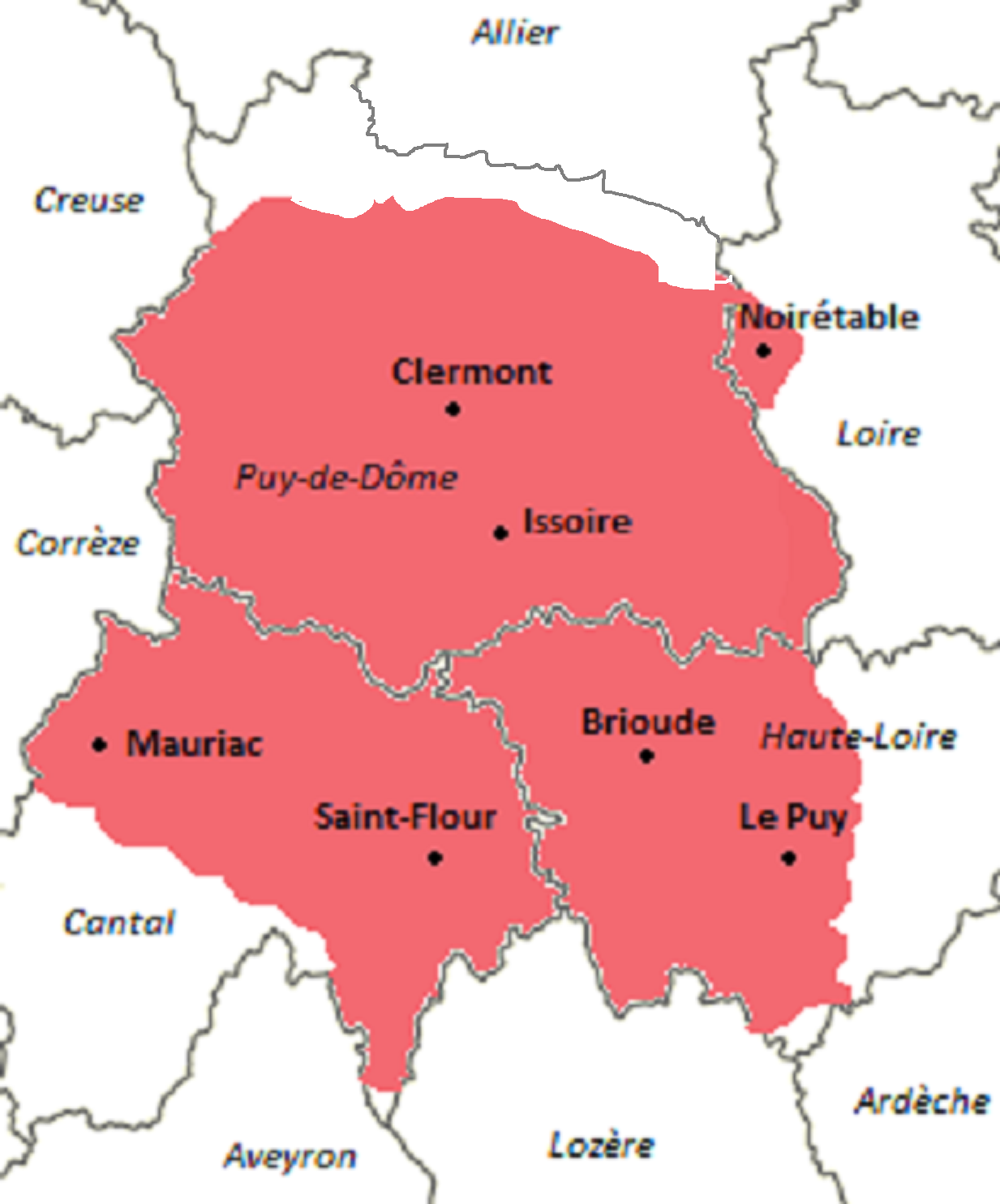

Auvergnat (/ˌoʊvɛrnˈjɑː/; French pronunciation: [ovɛʁɲa]) or Occitan auvergnat (endonym: auvernhat) is a northern dialect of Occitan spoken in central and southern France, in particular in the former administrative region of Auvergne.

Currently, research shows that there is not really a true Auvergnat dialect but rather a vast northern Occitan linguistic area. The word "Auvergnat" is above all a local historiographical creation. According to linguist Jean Roux, "It is by simplification that we use this term, because in no case Auvergnat can be considered as an autonomous linguistic entity".

With around 80,000 speakers in the Auvergne region at the beginning of the 21st century, it is considered to be severely endangered.

== Classification ==
Auvergnat falls under the following categories and subcategories: Indo-European, Italic, Romance, Italo-Western, Gallo-Iberian, Gallo-Romance, Occitan.

== History ==
Several troubadours were from the Auvergne, including Castelloza, Dalfi d'Alvernhe, the Monje de Montaudon, the Vesques de Clarmon, Peire d'Alvernhe, Peire Rogier and Pons de Capduelh. They did not, however, compose in the Auvergnat dialect, but in the standard literary register of Old Occitan.

Official documents in Auvergnat become common around 1340 and continue to be found down to 1540, when the transition to French was complete. The high point for the use of Auvergnat as an official language was between 1380 and 1480. There is a passion play, Passion d'Auvergne, first performed in Montferrand in 1477, that is written mainly in French but which contains an Auvergnat section of 66 lines. Auvergnat had been replaced by French in official usage in the Montferrand already in 1388. French had also supplanted Auvergnat as the language of the upper classes, but it remained the language of rural communities.

== Geographical distribution ==
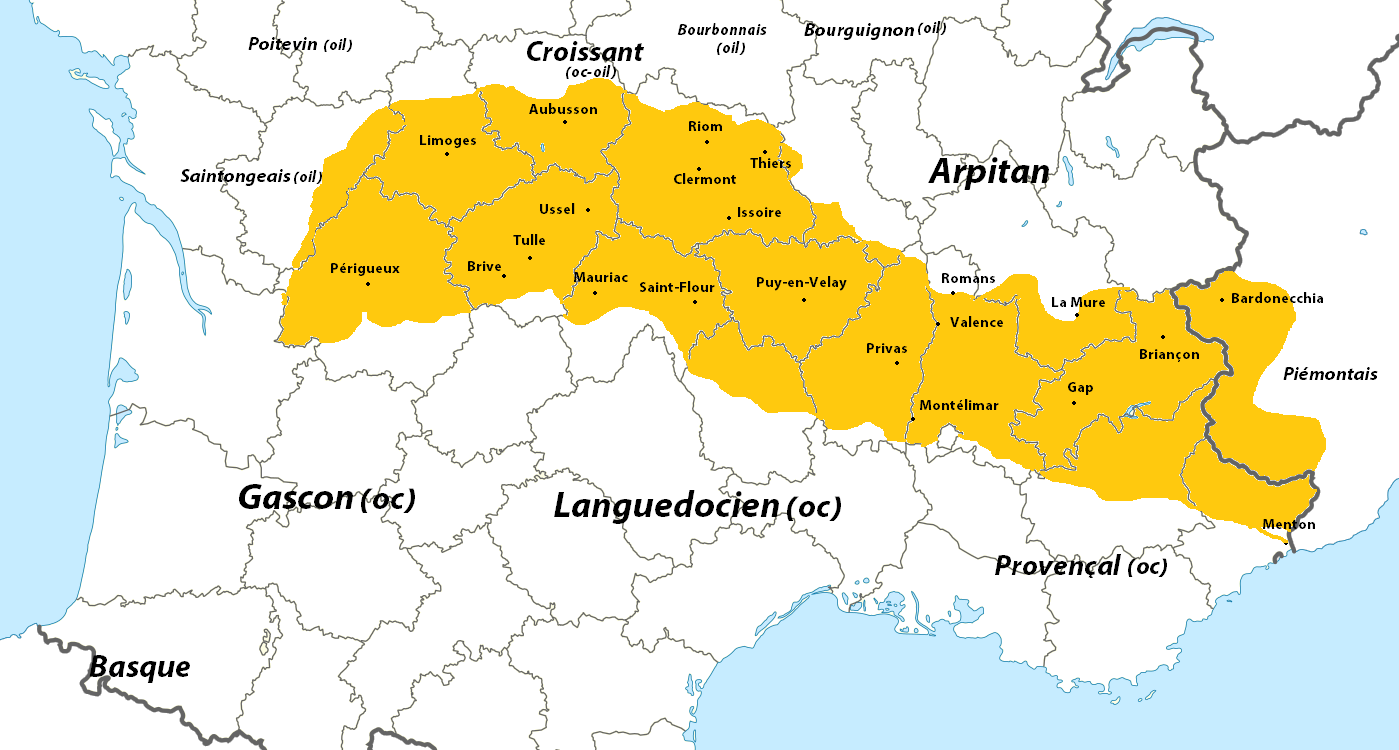
North Occitan dialects

Auvergnat dialect historiographical boundaries

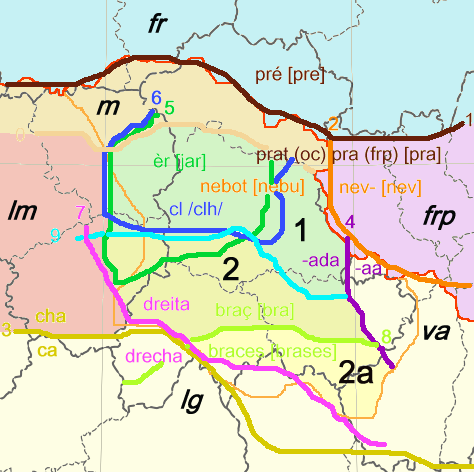
Auvergnat dialect delimitation

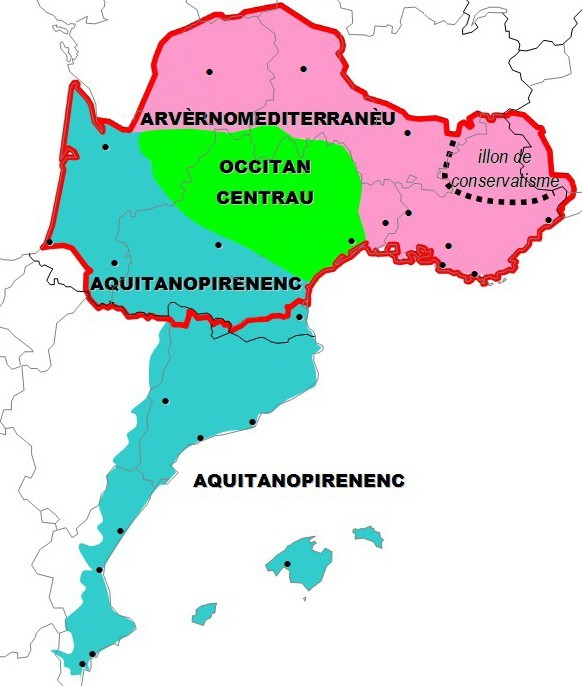
Arverno-Mediteraneù Occitan linguistic group

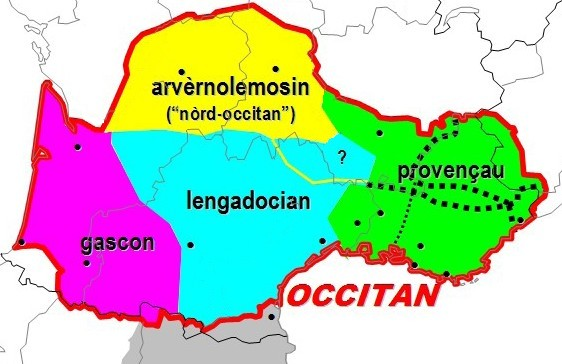
Arverno-Lemosin dialect (Jacques Allières researches)

The effective borders of Auvergnat do not completely coincide with those of the current Region of Auvergne or the historical region of Auvergne but can be described as follows:

- The entire département of the Puy-de-Dôme
- a large section of the département of Cantal, largely centred on Saint-Flour and Mauriac. Aurillac and the Pierrefort Canton speak a dialect called carladézien, a form of languedocien, with Auvergnat conjugations and the rest largely similar to standard languedocien.
- The larger portion of the Haute-Loire aside? Yssingeaux which speaks Vivaro-Alpine.
- the southern half of Allier, or the Bourbonnais province, near Montluçon and Vichy, with the northern half toward Moulins traditionally speaking French.
- The communities of Noirétable and La Chamba in the western side of the département of Loire.

=== A more precise view on Auvergnat boundaries ===
There are strong oppositions between Pierre Bonnaud (for whom the Auvergnat is a language of its own, see the light orange line on the map – note it is including the easternmost part of the Marchois dialect) and for instance Roger Teulat.

==== Language boundaries ====
- 1: Latin pratus (meadow) > pra (Occitan, Francoprovençal) vs. pré (French)
- 2: Latin nepos (nephew) > nebot (Occitan) vs. neveu. (French, Francoprovençal)

Light blue area labelled fr is for French-Langue d'Oïl. Light purple area labelled frp is for Francoprovençal.

==== Dialect boundaries ====
- 0: Absence of paroxytonic stress in the north – defines the Marchois dialect, a name often given to the Occitan spoken in the Croissant area. The area labelled m is that of the Marchois dialect.
- 3: The ca/cha boundary separated Northern Occitan (Limousin, Auvergnat, Vivaro-Alpine, Marchois) and Southern Occitan (Gascon, Languedocien, Provençal). It is part of the Auvergnat boundary, along with 7, in Cantal. Area lm is for the Limousin dialect, va for Vivaro-Alpine, lg for Languedocien.
- 4: Feminines in –ada have lost intervocalic d and became –aa: this separates Auvergnat and Vivaro-Alpine (almost the same boundary for first person indicative present in –o [u], another characteristic of Vivaro-Alpine).

==== Definition boundaries ====
These are not characteristic of Auvergnat as a whole but allow for defining a boundary:

- 5 and 6: These match the Core Auvergnat, according to Pierre Bonnaud. They may be used for the western boundary of Auvergnat. Area 5 has the pronunciation [jaR] of èr (around [ɛR]), area 6 has the palatalisation of 'cl' to [kʎ] or [çʎ].
- 7: Southeastern boundary has an opposition between dreita and drecha
- 8: This is for the southern boundary: the plural of braç has the same pronunciation than the singular; only the article allows differentiation.

Note that most Occitanists use rather 7 than 8 to define the southern boundary.

==== Internal variation ====
Note some of the definition boundaries allow defining an internal variation. The most traditional one between Lower or Northern Auvergnat and Upper or Southern Auvergnat is the mutation of s before [k], [p], and [t] (line 9). Lower Auvergnat, defined by Teulat, is the light green area labelled 1 on the map. Upper Auvergnat, defined by Teulat, is the light brown-yellow area labelled 2 on the map. A broader area (light yellow) is generally defined. A Northwestern Auvergnat may be defined as well by 5 and 6. The Northeastern (East of 5 and 6, North of 9) has, according to Bonnaud, a stronger influence from French phonetics (a bit like Marchois).

== Subdialects ==
According to Pierre Bonnaud, the following main dialects can be observed:

- Clermontois - spoken in Clermont Auvergne Métropole
- Sanflorain - spoken in the Saint-Flour region
- Paulinois

Furthermore, the following transitional dialects can be observed:

- Median Auvergnat - containing features of the main dialects and spoken in the Brivadois region.
- Auverno-Bourbonnais - transitioning into Bourbonnais and spoken from the Colettes Forest to Vichy.
  - Mountain Bourbonnais - influenced by French and Arpitan.
- Yssingelais - transitioning into Vivaro-Alpine and spoken around Yssingeaux.
- Sud Iointain - transitioning into Languedocian.

== Linguistic vitality and usage ==
An understanding of the vitality and overall usage of Auvergnat can be garnered from a survey carried out in 2006 in the Auvergne region.

The largest group of the two languages spoken in the Auvergne region is referred to as patois (78% of the population) compared with other regional terms, with certain cultural identities emerging, such as auvergnat (10%), occitan (8%), bourbonnais (5%) or langue d'oc (4%).

The regional language, whether Occitan (in the whole of the Auvergne region) or Oïl (the north of Allier), represents a strong presence in the region:

- 61% claim to understand their regional language more-or-less, with 22% claiming to understand it easily or perfectly.
- 42% claim to be able to speak it more-or-less, with 12% claiming it as easy.
- 29% claim to read Auvergnat more-or-less, with 10% claiming it easy.
- 17% claim to write Auvergnat more-or-less, with 4% declaring it easy.

A large part of the population that understands or speaks even a little or, moreover, fluently, neither know how to write nor read in that language.

Language learning is found to be essential within the home, according to the survey, (grandparents noted as 61%, or other family members at 50%) with a very weak result from the schools (10%). Herein is found the problem of language-transmission when dependent upon State sponsorship. 40% of adults who did not teach their language to their children report regretting it at the time of the survey. This feeling is reported more strongly among the 35 or less demographic, at 58%. The desire to learn the local language is reported strongly, with increasing representation among the young, reported at 23%. According to the survey the desire to incorporate local language learning in schools is as follows: Haute-Loire (53%), Puy-de-Dôme (51%) et Cantal (74%). The desire to teach to their own children is strong (41%) and is stronger still with the 35 and under demographic (58%). 71% of the region's inhabitants are favorable to the idea of maintaining the regional language and culture, with a stronger result in the 35-and-unders (76%). To achieve this desire, different institutions are expected to play a role (in percentage of those surveyed):

- France 3 Auvergne, the local television channel should offer regional language programming (54%)
- The Region (54%), National Education (43%), the Culture Ministry (42%) and the communities are seen by most Auvergnats as the most correct venues to develop and pass on the Auvergnat language and culture.

== Authors ==
The following are authors who have published in Auvergnat:

- Pierre Bonnaud
- Daniel Brugès
- Antoine Clet (1705–1785)
- François Cognéras
- Étienne Coudert
- Andrée Homette
- Karl-Heinz Reichel
- Jean Roux (PhD thesis online, 2020).
- Henri-Antoine Verdier, Mémoires d'un papi auvergnat, text in Auvergnat dialect and French, 2000.

== Poets ==
Poets using Auvergnat:

- Louis Delhostal (1877–1933)
- Faucon, La Henriade de Voltaire, mise en vers burlesques par Faucon, Riom; 1798; Le Conte des deux perdrix
- Roy Gelles, Le Tirage, poem, Clermont, 1836; Le Maire compétent, Clermont, 1841
- Camille Gandilhon, Gens d'Armes
- Ravel, La Paysade, epic poem
- Joan de Cabanas

== Songwriters ==
Songwriters using Auvergnat:

- Joseph Canteloube (Chants D'Auvergne: Vol. IV, No. 6: Lou Coucut online, 2017)

== See also ==
- Languages of France
- Occitan conjugation
- Occitan language
- Occitan phonology
