= Marchois (dialect) =

Occitan dialect

- Marchés
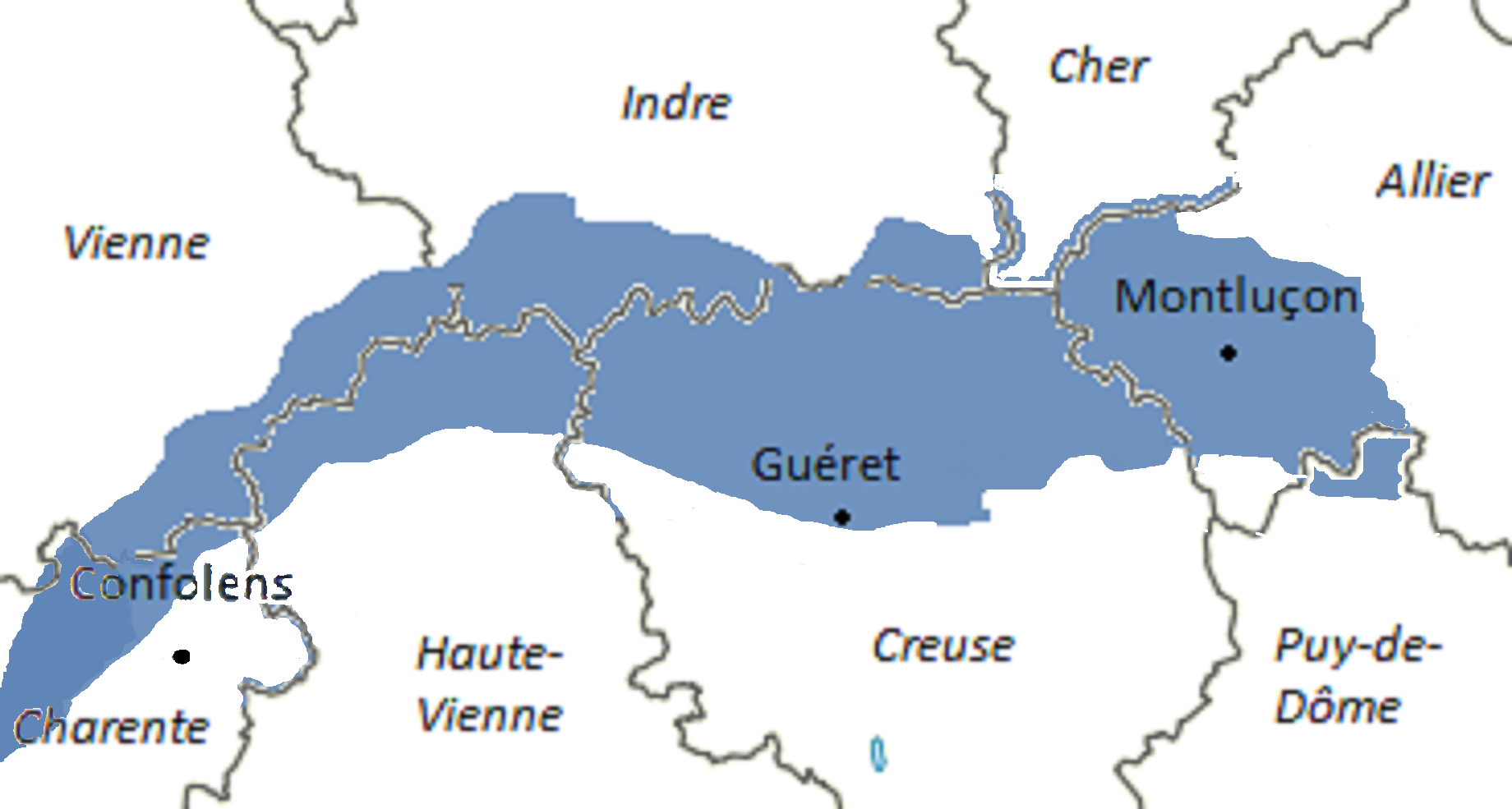
- Marchois speaking area
- Native to: France
- Region: La Marche, Communities in Limousin
- Language family: Indo-European: Italic; Latino-Faliscan; Latin; Romance; Italo-Western; Western Romance; Gallo-Iberian?; (disputed); Occitano-Romance; Occitan; Marchois

Language codes
- ISO 639-3: –
- Linguasphere: 51-AAA-gk
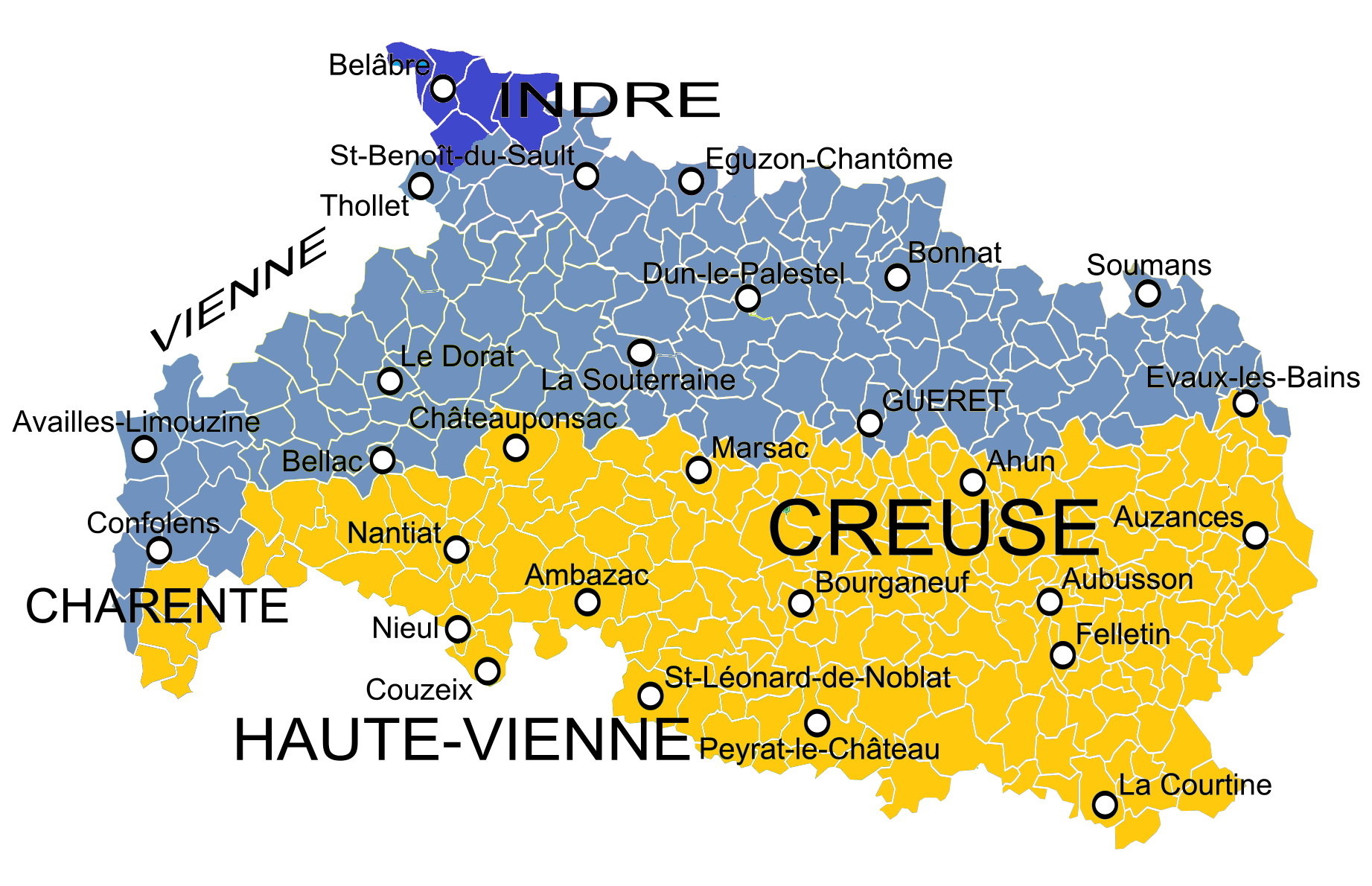
- Linguistic map of la Marche. The Occitan dialects: Limousin, Auvergnat (orange-yellow). Marchois (light blue), Oïl dialects (dark blue).

Marchois (French pronunciation: [maʁʃwa]) or Marchese (marchés in Occitan) is a transitional Occitan dialect between the Occitan language and the Oïl languages spoken in the historical region of La Marche, in northern Limousin and its region. Occitan and Oïl dialects meet there.

It covers the north-western borders of the Massif Central and forms the western part of the dialects of the Croissant which goes from Charente limousine to Montluçon.

== Classification ==
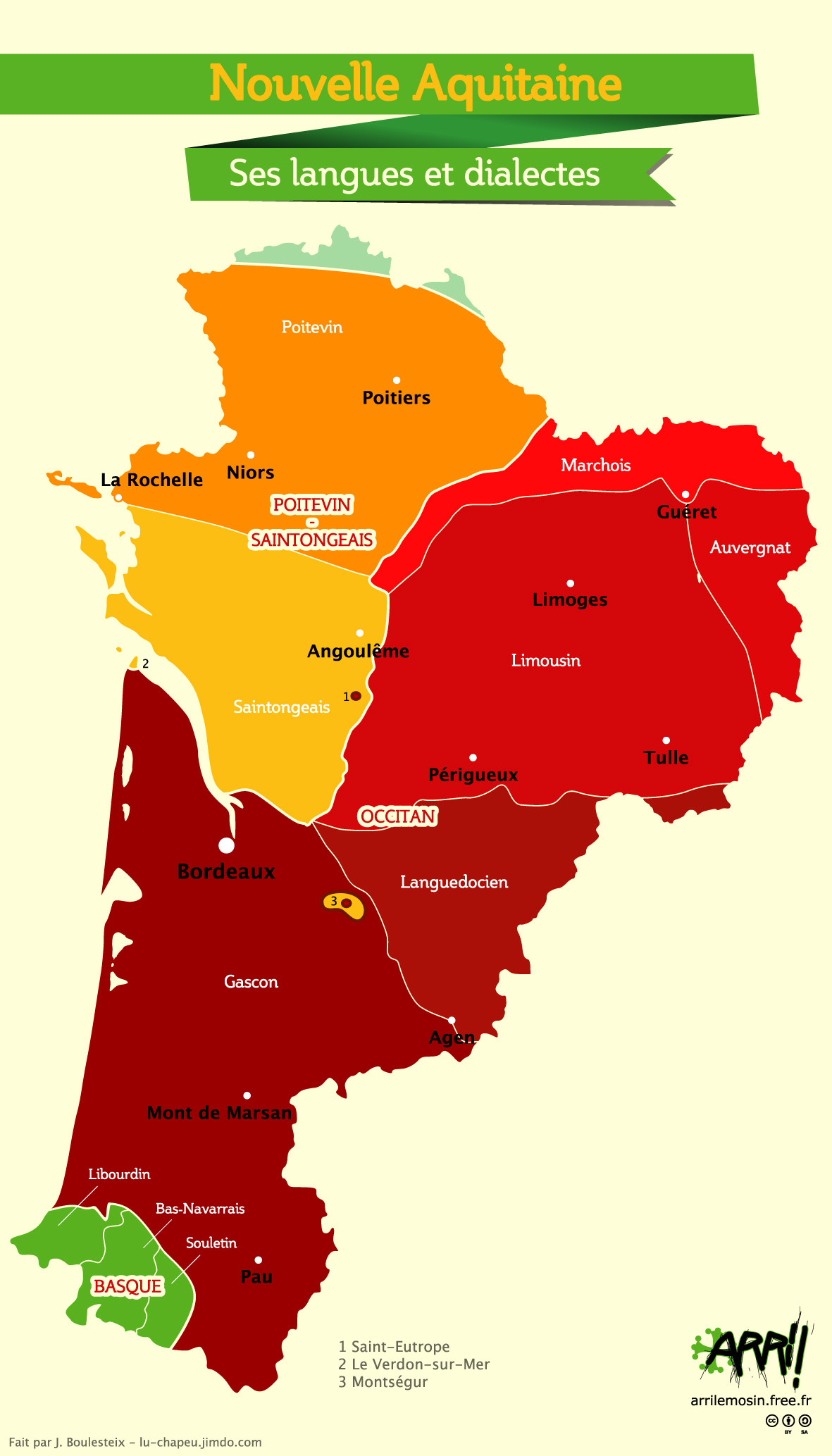
Marchois among Occitan languages and dialects of Nouvelle-Aquitaine region. This map was made by Arri ! collective of Limoges

=== An occitan/oïl transitional dialect ===
Marchois is a transitional dialect between the Occitan language and the langues d'oïl.

It forms the western two-third of the Croissant region where the languages oscillate between the Occitan language in the south and the Oïl languages in the north.

=== Occitan traits ===
Concerning Occitan traits, they are closer to Limousin than Auvergnat, both North Occitan dialects. It is sometimes classified as a sub-dialect of Limousin characterized by its transition with French.

It is more regularly mentioned as a full-fledged Occitan dialect, due to the difficulties of mutual intercomprehension between the people of Limousin and southern La Marche, and the many features that make it closer to the oïl languages. In transition with the langues d'oïl, Marchois is also in transition between the Occitan dialects of Limousin and Auvergne, respectively to the west and to the east of the latter.

It is sometimes considered a language in its own right, because of its intermediate position between Occitan language and Oïl languages, the same way as the Franco-Provençal language.

The neighboring dialects of Oïl languages like Poitevin-Saintongeais have features in common with Marchois, which has interactions with the latter, and shares an important common substrate.

== Distribution area ==
The area where Marchois is spoken does not coincide with the historical province of La Marche but extends beyond it. Marchois is spoken in the north of Creuse, and Haute-Vienne to which must be added the north of Charente Limousine around Confolens, some southern communes of Poitou but also the south of Boischaut, at the southern tip of Berry in the southern parts of Indre and Cher (Saint-Benoît-du-Sault, Lourdoueix-Saint-Michel, Culan), and finally Montluçon and its region in the Allier (Châtaigneraie).

The rest of the department of Allier once out of the Cher valley and from the center of the Bocage bourbonnais forms the eastern part of the Croissant where the speech is Arverno-Bourbonnais (Bocage, Limagne and Bourbonnaise mountain, Vichy). Guéret and Montluçon are the two main towns in La Marche region, both radiating over half of the Creuse department.

== Internal varieties ==
The Marchois dialect is divided into three main varieties.

- Southern Marchois which extends from the region of Bellac to Combrailles via Le Dorat, Magnac-Laval, Guéret.
- Central Marchois which extends from Availles-Limouzine to Néris-les-Bains via Arnac-la-Poste, La Souterraine then to Montluçon.
- Northern Marchois from Dun-le-Palestel to the south of the Tronçais forest via Bonnat, Châtelus-Malvaleix, Boussac, Treignat then the municipalities located north of Montluçon with the “Biachets” dialect (from Occitan biachés) .

== Written forms ==
Three main writing systems can be used to write Marchois. All three are encouraged by the research group on the dialects of the Croissant (CNRS):

- The international phonetic alphabet makes it possible to transcribe the language as well to record pronunciations.
- The French spelling can also be used and allows speakers to transcribe their dialects with the writing system of the French language with which they are also all familiar. Marchois being an intermediate dialect with the language of oïl it can therefore also be applied, especially since this spelling emphasises those pronunciations which are specific to it.
- The classic Occitan spelling with a precise local adaptation for Marchois. In Marchois the final Occitan “a” does not exist, it is replaced by a silent “e” as in French (e.g. jornade ("day") in place of the form jornada found in other Occitan dialects). This specific codification of this dialect is recommended by the Institute of Occitan Studies and its local sections (IEO Lemosin, IEO Marcha-Combralha).

== History ==
Early francization

The vast county of Marche experienced earlier francization than the rest of the Occitan-speaking countries. From the thirteenth century, an aristocratic class speaking langues d'oïl, e.g. the Lusignans, settled locally in the midst of an endogenous Occitanophone nobility. The region of Montluçon became linked in this period to the seigneury of Bourbon and to a territory whose lords were very close to the kings of France. They also originated in Champagne and brought—as was the case in Poitou and Saintonge—settlers from Champagne who spoke the local langue d'oïl variety. These settlers exerted a notable influence on the Bourbonnais d'Oïl but also on the Occitan dialects of Marche and Arverno-Bourbonnais.

The Bourbons arrived thereafter in the rest of the Marche (e.g., the famous count Jacques de La Marche) and influenced even more the language of the nobles. Neighboring Berry (strongly francized, even if significant parts of Occitan still remain) also influenced from the end of the Middle Ages on the towns and villages of the north of La Marche as in the region of Boussac.

The masons of La Creuse

The masons of La Creuse originating in the northern half of this department use Marchois even when displaced to other regions. They play on influences if they do not wish to be understood in certain "foreign" regions: they sometimes use the Occitan features so as not to make themselves understood in a territory where French is spoken, as in Paris, or vice versa, in other Occitan-speaking regions, they rely on langue d'oïl traits.

== Distinctive features ==
Marchois is linked to Limousin (dialect) (north-Occitan) but also to its northern neighbors, the southern dialects of oïl (Poitevin-Saintongeais, berrichon, bourbonnais d'oïl). The distinctive features of the rest of the Occitan dialects were in part established by Maximilien Guérin or Jean-Pierre Baldit, founder of the Institut d'études occitanes section La Marche and Combrailles.

Distinctive features vis-à-vis other Occitan dialects

- The phonology is close to French: "chabra" is pronounced "chabre" and no longer "chabro".
- Retention of the personal pronoun in front of each verb: "I chante" instead of "chante" or "chanti", as in North Occitan.
- The use as in French of the silent "e" while all other Occitan dialects, including Arverno-Bourbonnais, maintain the final Latin "a" in the feminine.

Distinctive features of Arverno-Bourbonnais

- General preservation of the intervocalic "d" which is lost in Arverno-Bourbonnais: chantada in Marchois (“sang” - pronounced chantade) and chantaa in Arverno-Bourbonnais.
- Maintaining the determiner and its elision in front of a verb that partially disappears in Arverno-Bourbonnais: Qu'es finite in Marchois ("It is finished" - pronounced "kou'i finite") and u'es chabat in Arverno-Bourbonnais (pronounced "é chaba", which is similar to the Franco-Provençal ou est “c'est”).

Occitan traits nevertheless remain very strong in La Marche, which remains attached to Occitan.

== Texts ==
- Nadau, collected by Marcel Rémy, a Christmas carol from La Souterraine. Transcription in classical Marchois script:

A l'ore de las legendas, quand le clhocher sone mineut, rendam nos dins las eglesias, per i passar le moment pieus.

Vos, las fennas que siatz prias, mesme quos qui que cresan pas. Anatz remplir las eglesias. Las eglesias seran plenas. E tos los cuers sauran chantar, e mesme en plhurant, esperar... Las prieras par le païs, par los absents, par los amics, s'envoleran au Paradis; le petiot Jesus sau escotar; On sau veire le Nadau de guèrre, las misèras, la paubre tèrre.

O sau tot veire e pardonar, Oc-es, raluman nostres amas, a l'ore de las legendas, a l'ore de las prieras.

== Authors ==
This is a non-exhaustive list of Marchois authors:

- Paul-Louis Grenier, historian and poet from Chambon-sur-Voueize, wrote both in Marchois and Limousin .
- Maximilien Guérin (CNRS), a linguist and also a writer, wrote Mes mille premiers mots en bas-marchois (2020) with Michel Dupeux.
- Marie-Rose Guérin-Martinet has notably published Le Pitit Prince, a translation of The Little Prince by Antoine de Saint-Exupéry into Marchois (2020).
- Jean-Michel Monnet-Quelet.

== Sample text ==
Article 1 of the Universal Declaration of Human Rights in Marchois.

- Classic Marchois standard:

Totes las persones naissan lieures e egales en dignitat e en dret. Als son dotades de rason e de consciénçe més i leur fau agir entre als dins une aime de frairesse.

- French standard:

Toutes las persones naissant lieures et égales en dignitat et en dret. Als sont dotades de rason et de conscience mais i leur faut agir entre als dins une aime de frairesse.
