= Orléanais dialect =

Langue d'oïl dialect of France

Orléanais
- Native to: France
- Region: Orléanais
- Language family: Indo-European: Italic; Latino-Faliscan; Latinic; Romance; Italo-Western; Western; Gallo-Iberian; Gallo-Romance; Gallo-Rhaetian?; Arpitan–Oïl; Oïl; Francien zone; Orléanais
- Writing system: Latin (French alphabet)

Language codes
- ISO 639-3: –

The Orléanais dialect (French pronunciation: [ɔʁleanɛ]) is a langue d'oïl that was part of a dialect group called Francien.

The dialect covers three departments, corresponding to the territory of Orléanais, former province of the kingdom of France: Loir-et-Cher, Loiret and Eure-et-Loir. It and other Francien dialects such as Berrichon progressively dissolved into a regional variant of French.
