= Angevin dialect =

Oïl language of Anjou, France

Angevin
- Native to: France
- Region: Pays de la Loire (Anjou, Maine, Pays Nantais), Centre-Val de Loire (Touraine)
- Language family: Indo-European: Italic; Latino-Faliscan; Latinic; Romance; Italo-Western; Western; Gallo-Iberian; Gallo-Romance; Gallo-Rhaetian?; Arpitan–Oïl; Oïl; Armorican zone; Eastern; Angevin
- Writing system: Latin

Language codes
- ISO 639-3: None (mis)
- Glottolog: ange1244

Angevin is the traditional langue d'oïl spoken in Anjou, a historic province in western France. It was also spoken in neighboring regions like the Pays Nantais (along with Gallo), Maine (along with Mayennois) and Touraine (along with Tourangeau).

It is closely related to other oïl dialects spoken in western France, especially Sarthois, Mayennois and Norman (south of ligne Joret) in what could be called Eastern Armorican (Angevin-Mayennois-Sarthois-South Norman). Eastern Armorican, together with Gallo, forms the "zone armoricaine" of Langues d'oïl. As an oïl language or dialect it shares many common features with French in vocabulary, phonemes and daily expressions.

It is also similar to the Gallo language (although Gallo has a stronger Celtic linguistic substrate that comes from Breton and not only from ancient Gaulish language). Angevin influenced the origin and development of Gallo in the Marches of Neustria (especially in the Breton March) beginning in the 9th and 10th centuries.

Angevin was the old speech of the Angevins or House of Plantagenet. However, in spite of this prestigious dynasty, Angevin never developed a notable literature, partially because the region of Anjou was integrated into the royal domains of the King of France (from the House of Capet) at the beginning of the 13th century, where the literary language was Parisian-based Francien.

Some words of Angevin origin were borrowed to English via Anglo-Norman at the Angevins domination of England.

Today it is almost an extinct dialect or language but it is preserved in the Rimiaux, poems written in Angevin, and also in some daily expressions.

== Literature ==
The Rimiaux are some of the best expressions of Angevin literature. Several Rimiaux from Angevin poets and writers have been published.

Honoré de Balzac used some Angevin words and speech in his novel Eugénie Grandet.

== Common Traits ==
1. treatment of the long Latin [e] and short [i]: they gave a diphthong [ei] in the oldest French, but while it evolved into [wa] in the central and eastern French dialects, in the west the diphthong turned into a single vowel [e] or [ɛ]
2. Treatment of the long [o] and the short [u] in Latin: they produced a diphthong [ou] in the earliest French, but while it evolved into [ø] (spelled -eu- or -œu-) in the central and eastern dialects, in the west it simplified to [u] (written -ou-)
3. The [a] is long at the end of words: [a:], where it sometimes replaces -aie / -ais. Examples: chênâ, hâ for chênaie, haie.
4. The [a] sometimes changes into [o] (ormouère = armoire) or into [ɛ] (chaircutier = charcutier).
5. the [ɛ] most of the time becomes [e] (méson = maison).
6. The digraph -oi- represents [we] as in Old French, from which it comes.
7. Opening of [ɛr] into [ar]. Examples: aubarge (auberge), harbe (herbe) [3], etc. cf. English marvel (merveille), etc.
8. A particular vowel feature is not common to the entire Angevine dialect area: the non-labialization of [e] after labials. The isogloss for this development, specific to the west, splits the Maine-et-Loire and Sarthe departments in two.

Products with the Latin suffix -ore(m) provide many examples of this particular evolution in the West (excluding, however, eastern Normandy): pêchoux (fisherman), chassoux (hunter), battoux (beater), prioux (prior). Those with the suffix -ōsus give adjectives in -oux: heuroux (happy), chançoux (lucky), etc.

treatment of the Latin suffix -oriu: while in French it evolved into -oir, in the western dialects, it becomes -eu. Examples: pre(n)sseu (press), raseu (razor), mireu (mirror), moucheu (handkerchief), etc.

Diphthongization of the nasalized [a]: Jacques Peletier du Mans noted in the 16th century (in a personal spelling he tried to promote): “Indeed, and in Normandy, and still in Brittany, in Anjou, and in your Maine... they pronounce the 'a' before 'n' a bit roughly and almost as if there were an 'au' by diphthong; when they say Normaund, Aungers, le Mauns, it’s a big thing.”

== Bibliography ==
- Paroles d'Oïl, DPLO, Mougon 1994, ISBN 2-905061-95-2
- A.-J. Verrier et R. Onillon, Glossaire étymologique et historique des parlers et patois de l'Anjou, t. I et II, 1908, consulter en ligne (tome I), consulter en ligne (tome II)
- Mots et expressions des Patois d'Anjou, Petit dictionnaire, Petit Pavé, 116 p. (ISBN 291158788X)
- Augustin Jeanneau et Adolphe Durand, Le Parler populaire en Anjou, Choletais, 1982, 197 p.
- Encyclopédie Bonneteau : Anjou, Maine-et-Loire, avril 2010, 320 p.
- Honoré de Balzac, Eugénie Grandet, vol. 5, édition dite du Furne, 1843
- Le petit Larousse (ISBN 2033012891)
