= Burgundian language =

The Burgundian language may refer to:

- Burgundian language (Oïl), the Oïl language known in French as Bourguignon, spoken in the region of Burgundy
- Sometimes the Frainc-Comtou dialect is referred to as part of the Burgundian group
- Burgundian language (Germanic), the extinct East Germanic language of the Burgundians
