= Ignota =

Ignota means "unknown", in the feminine form, in Latin, and is used in some contexts when the name of someone or something is unknown. It may refer to:

- Elizabeth Clarke Wolstenholme-Elmy (1833–1918), English teacher and suffragist who wrote under the pseudonym "Ignota"
- Plautia (mother of Aelius Caesar), also known as "Ignota Plautia", Roman woman of senatorial rank
- Lingua ignota ("unknown language"), a mystical language created by Hildegard of Bingen
