= Bourbonnais dialects =

Gallo-Romance dialects of Allier, France

Bourbonnais
- Native to: France
- Region: Allier and southeast Cher
- Language family: Indo-European: Italic; Latino-Faliscan; Latinic; Romance; Italo-Western; Western; Gallo-Iberian; Gallo-Romance; Gallo-Rhaetian?; Arpitan–Oïl; Oïl; Francien zone; Bourbonnais

Language codes
- ISO 639-3: None (mis)
- Glottolog: bour1246

The Bourbonnais dialects are spoken in the historic region of Bourbonnais, located in central France and including the department of Allier the area surrounding Saint-Amand-Montrond, in southeastern Cher. This linguistic zone is located between those home to the languages of Oïl, Occitan, and Franco-Provençal.

== Bourbonnais, an ambiguous term ==
Bourbonnais among the languages of France

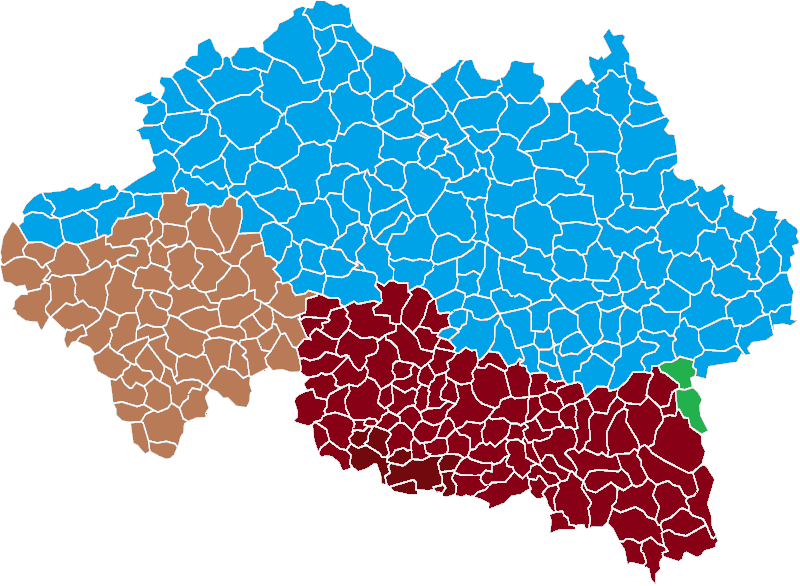
Oc and Oïl in Allier according to the 1977 Enquête linguistique and Simone Escoffier. Blue : Bourbonnais of the Oïl group; red: Bourbonnais of the Occitan group (Arverno-Bourbonnais)

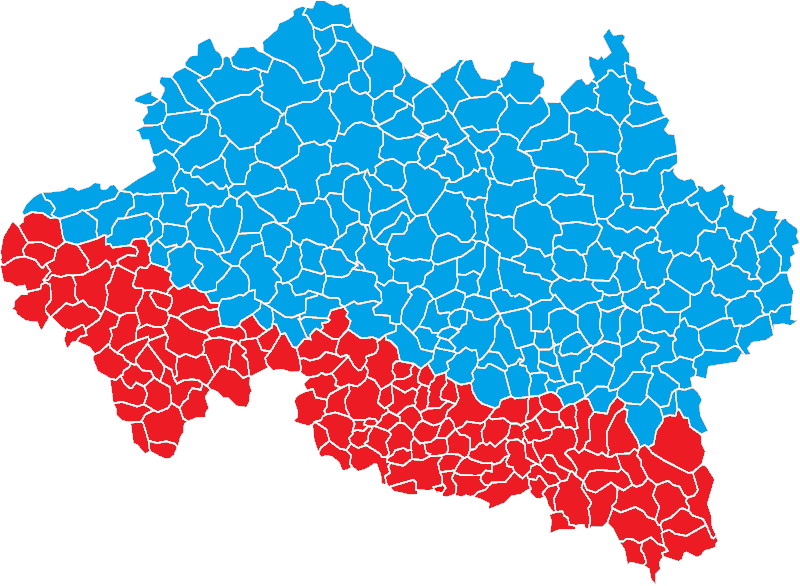
Oc and Oïl in Allier: traditional view espoused by a number of specialists including Frantz Brunet, Viple, Bardet; more or less close to that of Bonnaud and Reichel

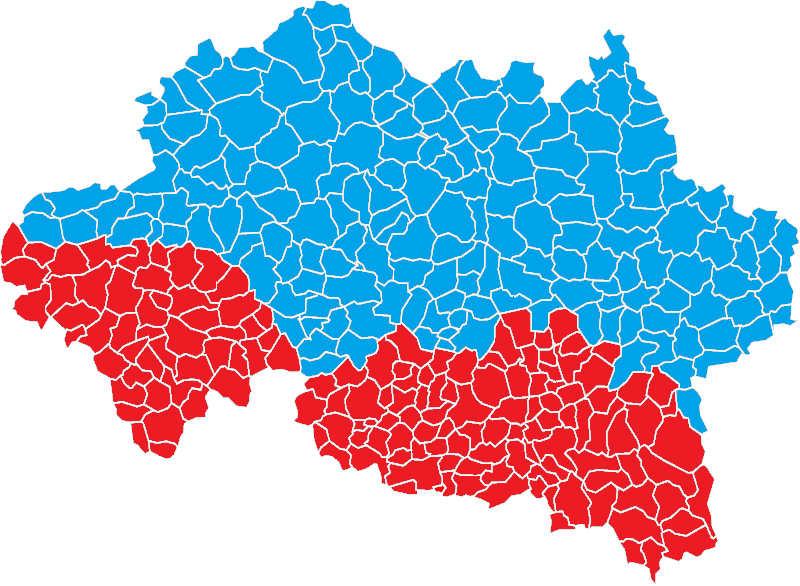
Linguistic map of Allier according to Karl-Heinz Reichel and Pierre Bonnaud

There are two indigenous languages in Bourbonnais:

- An Oïl language is spoken in two thirds of Allier, north of the line Montluçon (Occitan) – Saint-Pourçain-sur-Sioule (Oïl) – Lapalisse (Oïl), and in the Bourbonnais part of Cher. The dialect has its origins in the Moulins, Allier area, Bourbon-l'Archambault, and Souvigny.
- Occitan languages are spoken south of Montluçon and near Gannat and Vichy. These are dialects of the Occitan language of the Croissant (linguistic) in southern Bourbonnais and northern Limousin. They are on their way to be integrated into the French language. The scientific term for these idioms is Arverno-Bourbonnais, as they belong to the Auvergnat dialect linguistic zone, with a transition to the Oïl language.
- In the South-East, in the area of the Montagne Bourbonnaise, the local Occitan dialect is influenced by Franco-Provençal.

Thus "Bourbonnais" is an ambiguous term: it can refer to idioms of Occitan (Bourbonnais of Oc), or to French dialects of the Bourbonnais (Bourbonnais of Oïl).

== Present state ==
Bourbonnais dialects were submitted to a Parisian top-down approach, like all other regional languages in France. Besides, the presence of Oïl idioms in the North, which are close to Standard French or Francien (île-de-France dialect), makes it easier to have linguistic assimilation towards the South.

As the majority of dialects, Bourbonnais idioms are mostly spoken, and literary works are rare. However, there are some: one example is that of writer Louis Péroux Beaulaton (1872–1946), who was passionate about his Occitan Auvergnat dialect from the Montluçon suburbs. Nowadays only enthusiasts, as well as the older generation, can speak fluent Oïl and Occitan Bourbonnais dialects. Nevertheless, they haven't totally disappeared: they have been integrated into the French language, adding numerous phrases, expressions and vocabulary. Inhabitants of this region thus unconsciously speak French, but shaded with Bourbonnais forms: this can be noticed by tourists.

== Bourbonnais as an Oïl language ==
=== Pronunciation ===
Examples of pronunciation (transcriptions are made according to the IPA):

- ⟨o⟩ pronounced as [u]:

for example, tonner: French [tone] / Bourbonnais [tune]

- ⟨oi⟩ [w] is pronounced as [ue] or [ɛ]:

noir: Fr. [nwaR] / Bourb. [nuer]
droit: Fr. [dRwa] / Bourb. [dRɛ]

- ⟨er⟩ [eR] is pronounced as [aR]:

merci: Fr. [meRsi] / Bourb. [maRsi]

- ⟨re⟩ is pronounced as ⟨er⟩:

Bredin (look at word examples) would be pronounced as Berdin

- ⟨au⟩ [o] is pronounced as [jo]:

couteau: Fr. [kuto] / Bourb. [kutjo]

- ⟨-lier⟩ [lje] is pronounced as [je]:

palier: Fr. [palje] / Bourb. [paje]

- [R] is rolled as local speakers do in Champagne
- ⟨-eur⟩ [œR] is pronounced as [ø]:

meneur: Fr. [mənœR] / Bourb. [mənø]

- ⟨ch⟩ [ʃ] is pronounced as [ʒ]:

cheval: Fr. [ʃəval] / Bourb. [ʒval]

=== Grammar ===
The adverbial pronoun y 'there' is used as a personal pronoun representing an object. For example, Fr. fais-le 'do it' / Bourb. fais-y; Fr. donne-le-moi, donne-la-moi 'give it to me' / Bourb. donne-moi z'y; Fr. ne le casse pas 'don't break it' / Bourb. n'y casse pas; Fr. tu me le/la prêtes (lend it me) / Bourb. tu m'y prêtes.

There is, in Bourbonnais, a form for neutral gender: the pronoun al can be used for masculine gender as well as feminine gender, for inanimate objects and animate. Thus, both male and female dogs can be designated by al, just as a member of a family or a neighbour. For example, the phrase al a tout mange ('al ate it all') can be said about a dog but also about a neighbour.

=== Vocabulary ===
==== Expressions used in common French ====
Bourbonnais	French equivalent	English Translation
abonde	grande quantité	abundance
aluchon	enfant de constitution faible voire malingre	sickly child
arcandier	vaurien, filou	idler
baraille	dispute	dispute
belet	agneau	lamb
besugne	vêtement	clothes
biziot	propriétaire terrien parfois également agriculteur	landowner/farmer
bourri	âne	(animal) donkey
brelotter	secouer	shake (v)
chaleu	veilleuse	night owl
cobi	dindon	turkey
dâler		Usually is used in the phrase "ça dale"i.e."the sun burns too hot"
drille	diarrhée	upset tummy
emmanche	problème, complication	problem
gibalbouser	mettre le désordre	make a mess
gounelles	jupons	petticoat
jau	coq	cock
mourer	abîmer	harm
pluire	pleuvoir	rain (v)
taillon	quartier de fruit	bit of a fruit

Bourbonnais	French equivalent	English Translation
Aga don (v)	Regarde(diminutive from look then)	Look(v)
Arpion (n.m)	Orteil	Toe
Beugner (v)	Cogner	Knock(v)
Beugne (n.f)	Coup	Knock (n)
Boucan (n.m)	Du Bruit	Noise(n)
Bouchure (n.f)	Haie qui pique	Prickly Hedge
Bousiller	Abîmer	Damage (v)
Chabrot(n.m)	Mettre du vin dans sa soupe	Add some wine to the soup
Сh'ti/ch'titte (n.m/f)	Petit/Petite	Little
Crognon (n.m)	Extremité du pain	Crust of bread
Dépanaillé (n.m)	Avoir les vêtements en deésordre	Have one's clothes in a mess
Jargeot (n.m)	Quelqu'un qui parle souvent et est un peu simple d'esprit.	Chatterer
Soulot (n.m)	Ivrogne	Drunk

== Bourbonnais, Arverno-Bourbonnais, Occitan language (Croissant zone) ==
In this part we will look at the Occitan variant of Bourbonnais (Arverno-Bourbonnais/Auvergnat dialect), spoken in the community of Busset canton Cusset. The words are given in united Auvergnat writing; transcription using the phonetic alphabet used for French is given between brackets.

=== Vocabulary ===
Arverno-bourbonnais	French equivalent	English Translation
abonde	grande quantité	big quantity
arcandier [arcandji]	vaurien, filou, sans parole	idler
bachat o bachàs	auge	manger
bergeir, bergeira [barji, barjire]	berger, bergère	shepherd
bisbilha [bisbille]	dispute	dispute
cacoela [cacouelle]	récipient (marmite, casserole)	recipient
chamina [ch'mina]	cheminée	chimney
cusina	cuisine	kitchen
degobilhar [degobillâ]	vomir	vomit (v)
doçament [doussamin]	doucement	gently
endreit [endreï]	endroit	place
fromatge [froumaje]	fromage	cheese
goèra [gouère]	tarte	pie
gota [goutte]	eau de vie	spirits (pure alcohol)
jorna [journà]	journée	day
meidia [maïde]	midi	noon
moment [moumin]	moment	moment
auseau [ozio]	oiseau	bird
quauque uns [quoque nun], quauque unas [quoque nune]	quelques-uns, quelques-unes	some people
singlhar [sinyâ]	sanglier	boar

== Texts ==
=== The first article of The Universal Declaration of Human Rights ===
L'houme é nessu libre et anyère anvé des drets et d'la digneté. Al'a unhne aime et unhne radzon et tos les houmes douévent s'aidié ente ieux keme des frères.

=== L'Oïasse de Gayette ===
Vé le bourg de Montoudre, su un teurau qu'y a des boés d'un coûta et des pra de Faute, forts-tarrains et fôrt-tarrines, veïez-vous l'hôpital de Gayette ? Ou é bin-n-aisant a vère dret-là : Ion que l'é, a semble un villadze. Ou é unhne retirance pre les vieux strôpiâs. Mais faudrun pas crère qu'ai é étâ bâti à l'esqueprê pre deveni unhne boéte à varmine. San unhne oïasse, a serun pas é pouvres. Ou essô un beau tsâquiau qu'unhne dame bin ritse habitô. Dans les vaissiyés, les sarvantes pouziant tous les dzours des pitsiés, des fourtsettes et des quilles en ardzent; la dame avô tzôzi les filles les pu hounêtes dou pays, et dzamais presoune les ère acorpées de voul. Unhne de ieux z'aute enlevô unhne oïasse qu'un cheti gâavô dégniâ dans les brantses dou tsâgne. Ion qu'où embredzô les maufesans. "Têh ! li avô dit cou gâ bin fûtâ, ou te pourterâ bounheûr." Et le li douni. La sarvante enleva que l'oïasse; li apprenô à causer. Le lendemain d'un apport, la dame avisa ce que l'avô d'ardzentriun; li manquô un quille. Le tretzi la gâte qu'avô randzâ les vaissiyés : ou essô mêmement la sarvante à l'oïasse. Le la fait empougner et le la questioune : Ta beau dire qu'où é pas se, le la condanhne et l'embredze au tsâgne des maufesans. Le disi, en mourant, la paure sarvante : "Vêla ce que m'a coûta mon oïasse que devô me pourter bounheûr !" Un an après, en réparant la couvârture dou tsâquiau, sou unhne tuile, le couvreû trouve le quille predu. A cou moument, Toïasse empourtô au même endrêt unhne pièce de mounaie que le venô de prendre. Le couvreû y dit à la dame qui agour se tsagrine : "Paure sarvante qu'i ai fait meuri !", que le disi. Deux anhnées pu tard, aile douni son tsâquiau et ses appartenances é pouvres de Varennes, de Montoudre, de Boucé, de Montaigu, de Rondzères, de Landzy, de Saint-Dzerand, de Crétsy, de Sanssat et des alentours. Velà ce que me disi Dzôzé, le vieu ancien meneû de loups qu'é mort y a mais de soixante ans, et que le monde cause inquère.

=== L'Agrôle et le Rena ===
En 1850, le bétchio parlève inquère; v'la c'quo disève :
Un jou d'hivia, quou ne fasève pas trop biau,
L'agrôle ère juchade au bout d'un baliviau
L'ère su daut moutade,
Pa fère son dinâ que l'aye prépara.
Embéi un groua fromage vainhiu de Chambéra
Le rena dépeu treis jous que n'aye pas de pain,
Aussitôt s'appeurché en fasant le câlin.
Eh, bonjou note dame, coumant vous pourtez-vous ?
Hela ! qué sé contint de vous véire chia n'zote !
Et vous trouve si gente embé quo nail mantiau !
Présoune dé le boux n'en pourte un aussi biau !
Votés souliés sont faits d'iune piau qué tant fine,
Et creyes que le ré n'en a pas de parés pindus à sa souline.
Ar sé é vous écouti dire iune chansou
Et cregus, oui ma foué, quou ére le rossignou
Si zère chabretère, par avi voté jeu
E' doniau, é n'en jure, la méta de ma queue.
L'agrôle qu'ère enchantade de se veire vantade
Pa li douna l'aubade se meté à couana,
Son froumage dévalé dé la gueule do renâ,
Alle resté su-daut le bé bada.
Ma l'autre, li dissé, en migeant son fricot,
Ne si'a don pas si buse un autre co.

== In films ==
In the film "La soupe aux choux", some characters speak more or less Standard French mixed up with phrases, words and pronunciation of Oïl Bourbonnais.

== See also ==
- Linguistics
- Index of language articles
- List of language families
- Indo-European languages
- Romance languages
- Langues d'oïl
- Berrichon dialect
- Franco-Provençal language
- Occitano-Romance languages
- Occitan language
- Auvergnat dialect
- Croissant (linguistic)
- Dialectology

== Bibliography ==
- Investigation of the IFOP for the Auvergnat section of the Institut d'études occitanes, 2006.
- Jean Bernard and Jean Chardonnet, Lexique du parler bourbonnais. Le bocage bourbonnais, Charroux, Éd. des Cahiers bourbonnais.
- Marcel Bonin (1984) Dictionnaire général des patois bourbonnais, Moulins, printed in Pottier. (ISBN 978-2950068712)
- Pierre Bonnaud (1992), Grammaire générale de l'auvergnat à l'usage des arvernisants, coll. Eubransa / Travaux, Chamalières, Cercle Terre d'Auvergne.
- Pierre Bonnaud, Nouveau dictionnaire général français-auvergnat, Nonette, Created, June 1999, 776 p. (ISBN 2909797325 et 978-2909797328)
- J.L. Bourioux, Le parler de Busset, association "dà coutà d'vé Buss".
- Jean-Pierre Chambon et Philippe Olivier (2000), "L'histoire linguistique de l'Auvergne et du Velay: notes pour une synthèse provisoire", Travaux de linguistique et de philologie 38, pp. 83–153.
- Frantz Brunet, Dictionnaire du parler bourbonnais et des régions voisines, Paris, 1964; republished be De Borée, 1993.
- René Chicois, Le parler biachet et montluçonnais au milieu du XXe siècle, Charroux, Éd. des Cahiers bourbonnais.
- Wolfgang Dahmen (1985), Étude de la situation dialectale dans le Centre de la France : un exposé basé sur l'Atlas linguistique et ethnographique du Centre, Paris, CNRS.
- Simone Escoffier (1958) La rencontre de la langue d'oïl, de la langue d'oc et du franco-provençal entre Loire et Allier : limites phonétiques et morphologiques, coll. Publications de l'Institut de linguistique romane de Lyon, vol. 11, Paris, Les Belles Lettres
- Simone Escoffier (1958) Remarques sur le lexique d'une zone marginale aux confins de la langue d'oïl, de la langue d'oc et du francoprovençal, coll. Publications de l'Institut de linguistique romane de Lyon, vol. 12, Paris, Les Belles Lettres
- Michel Labonne, Alain Muller, Sylvie Vilatte, Mémoires du patois de Sologne bourbonnaise. Langage et société, Moulins, Société d'émulation du Bourbonnais (prix Achille-Allier, 2014).
- Louis Péroux-Beaulaton (1940), Les parlers populaires en le Centre de la France : pays de Combrailles, voisinages du Berry, du Limousin et de l'Auvergne, sn., Montluçon [1re éd. sd., vers 1907].
- Karl-Heinz Reichel, Études et Recherches sur les parlers arverno-bourbonnais aux confins de l'Auvergne, du Bourbonnais, de la Marche et du Forez, collection Eubransa/Travaux, Chamalières, Cercle Terre d'Auvergne, 2012
- Karl-Heinz Reichel, Grand dictionnaire général auvergnat-français, Nonette, Créer, 3 décembre 2005 (ISBN 9782848190211 et 2848190213)
- Jules Ronjat (1930–1941), Grammaire istorique [sic] des parlers provençaux modernes, 4 vol. [republished in 1980, Marseille, Laffitte Reprints, 2 vol.]
- Jean Roux, L'auvergnat de poche, Chennevières-sur-Marne (Val-de-Marne), Assimil, coll. "Assimil évasion", 2002 (ISBN 9782700503197 et 2700503198)
