= Croissant (linguistic zone) =

Crescent-shaped linguistic zone in France

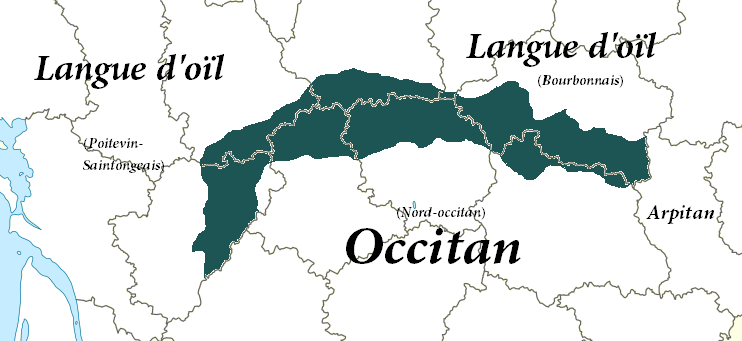
Northern parts of the Lemosin and Auvernhat dialects

The Croissant (Occitan: lo Creissent; French: le Croissant) is a linguistic transitional zone between the Langue d'oc (also referred to as Occitan) dialects and the Langue d'oïl dialects, situated in the centre of France where Occitan dialects are spoken (Limousin and Auvergnat) that have transitional traits toward French (Langue d'oïl). The name derives from the contours of the zone that resemble a croissant, or crescent.

The first author to use the term Croissant was the linguist Jules Ronjat (1864–1925) in 1913.

There are two main Croissant dialects:

- Marchois, which is closer to the Limousin dialect, is found in the west, going from Confolentais (Charente) to Montluçon and its surrounds (west of Allier/Gorges du Cher) and passing through the north of Creuse and Guéret.
- The dialects in the eastern two-thirds of the Bourbonnais d'oc dialect region are, as far as they are concerned, Arverno-Bourbonnais dialects belonging to the Auvergnat dialect zone of the Croissant, centered around Chantelle and Vichy, with influences from Francoprovençal.

== Territory ==
The Croissant’s territory is shaped like a tapered crescent, joining the Tardoire valley in Charente (to the west) to Monts de la Madeleine in Allier (to the east). The crescent is very narrow between its westernmost point and Le Dorat (between 10 and 15 km wide) but widens towards the east: between 30 km (at Guéret) and 45 km (at Culan).

The principal communes in the zone:

- Charente: Saint-Claud, Champagne-Mouton
- Vienne: Pressac, Availles-Limouzine
- Haute-Vienne: Bussière-Poitevine, Le Dorat, Magnac-Laval, Saint-Sulpice-les-Feuilles
- Indre: Saint-Benoît-du-Sault, Lourdoueix-Saint-Michel, Éguzon-Chantôme
- Creuse: La Souterraine, Crozant, Guéret, Dun-le-Palestel, Genouillac, Bonnat, Boussac
- Cher: Culan, Vesdun, Préveranges, Saint-Priest-la-Marche
- Puy-de-Dôme: Saint-Éloy-les-Mines
- Allier: Montluçon, Néris-les-Bains, Commentry, Chantelle, Montmarault, Vichy, Saint-Germain-des-Fossés, Cusset, Le Mayet-de-Montagne, Audes

The main Langue d’oc cities in the Croissant are Guéret, Montluçon and Vichy.

== Classification ==
Most linguists specializing in the Croissant dialects confirm it is a predominantly Occitan-speaking zone. (Tourtoulon & Bringuier, Dahmen, Escoffier, Chambon & Olivier, Quint). Only Jules Ronjat expresses a more cautious opinion by refusing to explicitly say if the Croissant comes under Langue d’Oc or Langue d’Oïl (French). Since Ronjat’s hesitation, some books by Occitan scholars (Pierre Bec, Robert Lafont) have been reluctant to present the Croissant as a completely Langue d'oc zone. However, cultural studies conducted in the Croissant from the 1970s (Quint, Merle) prove that linguistic and cultural awareness of Occitan is widespread there.

Since the 1970s, edited maps include nearly all of the Croissant in the Langue d’oc region. Guylaine Brun-Trigaud even includes the Langue d’oïl dialects with Occitan features.

Likewise, the writer Valery Larbaud (1881-1957), who originated from Vichy, in the Croissant zone, expressed his support for the idea of a union of Langue d’oc regions in his work Jaune bleu blanc (Yellow blue white) (1927).

== Historical, territorial and linguistic evolution ==
The influence of French in the Croissant zone goes back a long way. The presence of French-speaking nobility and administrators caused, from the second half of the 13th century, administrative and legal documents to be written in French and not in the local dialects, as well as in Marche County (Limousin-speaking territory) and in Bourbonnais (Auvergnat-speaking territory). In Bourbonnais, the earliest known documents written in the local vernacular are deeds in French with some Occitan forms inserted from 1245. Therefore, the Croissant has been a Langue d’oc-Langue d’oïl diglossia since that time, long before French had spread through the rest of the Langue d’oc linguistic area. The border between Langue d’oc and Langue d’oïl was once located further north and has moved southward over the centuries. The French dialects the north of the Croissant (the southern part of Berry and the northern part of Bourbonnais) still contain traces of the Langue d’oc substrate.

The spread of French towards the Croissant has been a long and progressive process, in contrast to the quite rapid désoccitanisation of Poitou, Saintonge and Angoumois, which took place between the 12th and 15th centuries, principally from the ravages of the Hundred Years' War, which caused the area to be consecutively repopulated.

In the Croissant dialects, the spread of Gallicisms has increased, weakening the local Occitan variants. During the last few centuries, it seems that progression to have been more rapid in Marche County (Limousin-speaking territory) than in Bourbonnais (Auvergnat-speaking territory). However, since the 20th century, in all cases, the spread of French has resulted in a diglossia, and linguistic substitutions similar to those across all of the Langue d’oc regions. That puts into perspective the "gallicised" aspects of the Croissant dialects today since nearly all Occitan dialects are undergoing a process of Gallicization.

== Dialectological subdivisions ==
There is no clear dialectological subdivision in the Croissant region, and the general impression is that it is largely fragmented. There is no clear border between the Auvergnat dialect region and the Limousin dialect region since the "border" between these two dialects is a vast transitional zone spanning the entire eastern part of the Limousin region (well beyond the Croissant).

In any case, from a cultural and possibly dialectological point of view, the west of the Croissant as far as Montluçon belongs to Limousin or La Marche (Marchois is spoken there).

The eastern part of the Croissant from Montmarault, where the Averno-Bourbonnais dialect is found, is linked to Auvergnat.

Within the Auvergnat area, there is a distinct zone influenced by Francoprovençal in the south-east of Bourbonnais (the south-eastern part of Allier), towards the Bourbonnais Mountains. There, since ancient times, the intervocalic d is dropped, in particular in -aa endings (for -ada), as is also the case in Vivaro-Alpin, where the loss of the d can also be explained by its proximity to Francoprovençal.

== Traits ==
The Croissant dialects are quite heterogenous according to Ronjat, but the following characteristics are commonly found:

- According to accounts from Croissant dialect speakers, intercomprehension is a little difficult but often possible with other dialects located to the south. It is much more difficult with the dialects located to the north.
- The final vowels -a and -e are often completely silent in the Croissant, but they are very clearly pronounced in the other Occitan dialects. On the other hand, it is possible to hear -as [a(:)] and -es [ej/ij] endings, which can potentially bring out the tonic accent. Despite that phenomenon, there are still traces of a mobile tonic accent, which can fall either on the second-last syllable of a word (a paroxytone) or on the last syllable (an oxytone), in contrast to modern French, whose stress is always on the last syllable.
- Expressive uses, despite the invasion of French forms (such as était starting to take the place of èra), retain a large number of authentic Occitan traits and considerable lexical and idiomatic creativity (Escoffier).

== Bibliography ==
- Bec, Pierre (1995). La langue occitane, coll. Que sais-je? n° 1059, Paris: Presses Universitaires de France [1st ed. 1963].
- Bonin, Marcel (1981). Le patois de Langy et de la Forterre (région de Varennes-sur-Allier), Cagnes-sur-Mer: Cahiers Bourbonnais.
- Bonin, Marcel. (1984) Dictionnaire général des patois bourbonnais, Moulins: impr. Pottier.
- Brun-Trigaud, Guylaine. (1990) Le Croissant: le concept et le mot. Contribution à l'histoire de la dialectologie française au XIXe siècle [PhD thesis], coll. Série dialectologie, Lyons: Centre d'Études Linguistiques Jacques Goudet.
- Chambon, Jean-Pierre and Philippe Olivier (2000) "L'histoire linguistique de l'Auvergne et du Velay: notes pour une synthèse provisoire", Travaux de linguistique et de philologie 38: 83-153.
- Dahmen, Wolfgang (1985). Étude de la situation dialectale dans le Centre de la France: un exposé basé sur l'"Atlas linguistique et ethnographique du Centre", Paris: CNRS [1st ed. in German, 1983, Studien zur dialektalen Situation Zentralfrankreichs: eine Darstellung anhand des 'Atlas linguistique et ethnographique du Centre', coll. Romania Occidentalis vol. 11, Gerbrunn bei Würzburg: Wissenschaftlicher Verlag A. Lehmann].
- Escoffier, Simone (1958a). La rencontre de la langue d'oïl, de la langue d'oc et du franco-provençal entre Loire et Allier: limites phonétiques et morphologiques [PhD thesis], Mâcon: impr. Protat [another similar edition is: coll. Publications de l'Institut de Linguistique Romane de Lyon-vol. 11, Paris: Les Belles Lettres].
- Escoffier, Simone (1958b). Remarques sur le lexique d'une zone marginale aux confins de la langue d'oïl, de la langue d'oc et du francoprovençal, coll. Publications de l'Institut de Linguistique Romane de Lyon-vol. 12, Paris: Les Belles Lettres.
- Jagueneau, Liliane (1987). Structuration de l'espace linguistique entre Loire et Gironde: analyse dialectométrique des données phonétiques de l'"Atlas linguistique et ethnographique de l'Ouest" [PhD thesis], Tolosa: Université de Toulouse-Le Mirail.
- Lafont, Robert (1987). Clefs pour l'Occitanie, coll. Clefs, Paris: Seghers [1st ed. 1971b].
- Merle, René (1977). Culture occitane per avançar, Paris: Éditions Sociales.
- Quint, Nicolas (1991). Le parler marchois de Saint-Priest-la-Feuille (Creuse), Limoges: La Clau Lemosina.
- Quint, Nicolas (1996). Grammaire du parler occitan nord-limousin marchois de Gartempe et de Saint-Sylvain-Montaigut (Creuse), Limoges: La Clau Lemosina.
- Quint, Nicolas (2002). "Le marchois: problèmes de norme aux confins occitans" [CAUBET Dominique, & CHAKER Salem, & SIBILLE Jean (Joan) (2002) (dir.) Codification des langues de France, Paris: L'Harmattan, actes dau collòqui "Les langues de France et leur codification", Paris, Inalco, 29–31 May 2000: 63-76].
- Ronjat, Jules (1930–1941). Grammaire istorique [sic] des parlers provençaux modernes, 4 vol. [re-ed. 1980, Marseilles: Laffitte Reprints, 2 vol.].
- Tourtoulon, Charles de and Octavien Bringuier (1876). Étude sur la limite géographique de la langue d'oc et de la langue d'oïl (avec une carte), Paris: Imprimerie Nationale [re-ed. 2004, Masseret-Meuzac: Institut d'Estudis Occitans de Lemosin/Lo Chamin de Sent Jaume].
