= Langues d'oïl =

Dialects including French and its close relatives

Oïl
- Langues d'oïl, French, Oïlitan
- Region: Northern and central France, southern Belgium, Switzerland, Guernsey, Jersey, Sark, French America, Francophone Africa, Polynesia, Vanuatu
- Language family: Indo-European: Italic; Latino-Faliscan; Latin; Romance; Italo-Western; Western; Gallo-Iberian?; Gallo-Romance; Gallo-Rhaetian?; Arpitan–Oïl; Oïl
- Early forms: Old Latin: Vulgar Latin; Proto-Romance; Old Gallo-Romance; Old French
- Dialects: Varieties

Official status
- Recognised minority language in: French Community of Belgium (Note: Champenois, Lorrain (Gaumais), Picard and Walloon)

Language codes
- ISO 639-3: –
- Glottolog: oila1234 cent2283 Central Oil
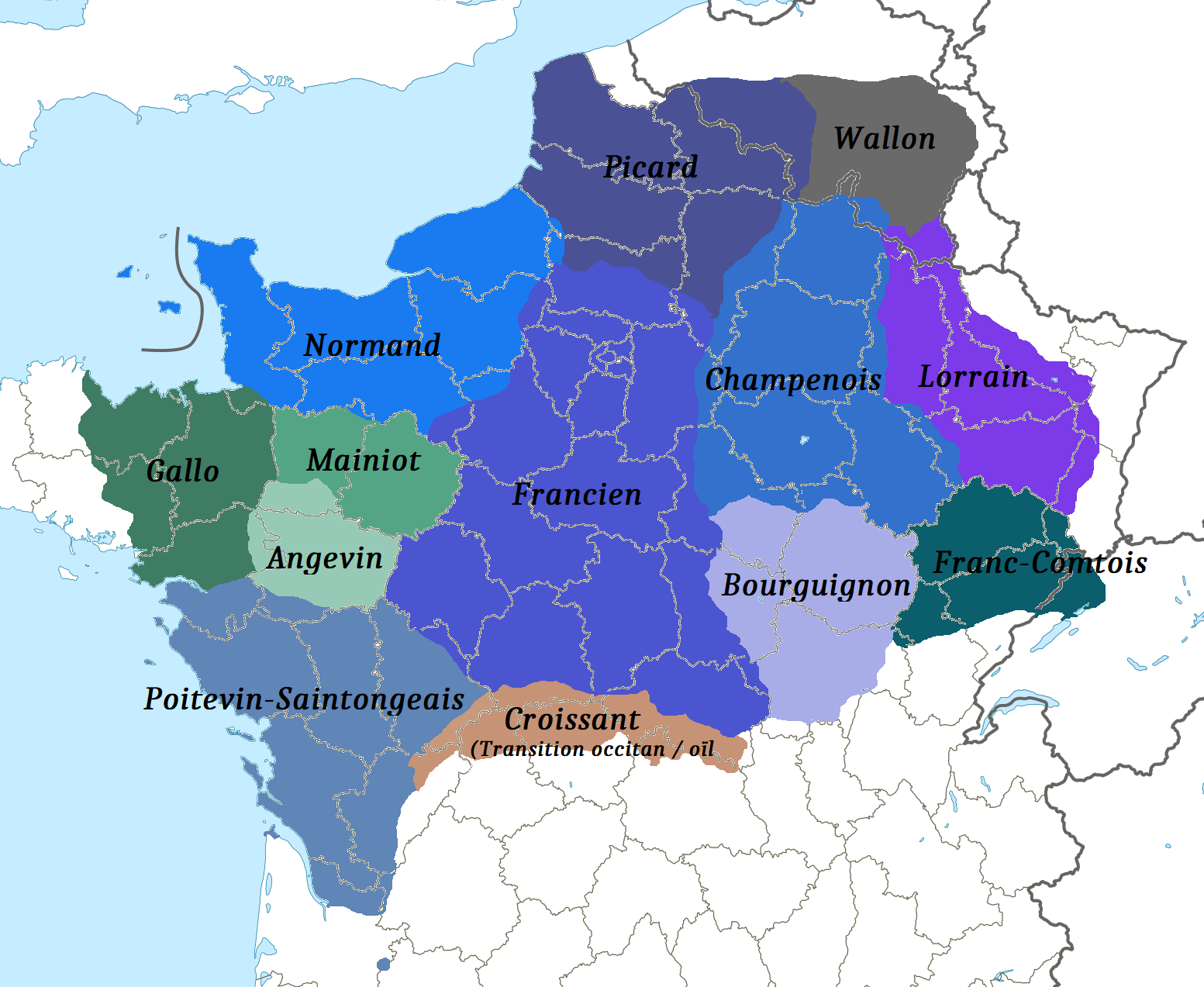
- The different varieties of the langue d'oïl + the Croissant according to the Speaking Atlas of Minority Languages (CNRS, 2020).

The langues d'oïl (Note: /lɒŋ ˈdɔɪ(l)/ long DOY(L), /lɒ̃ɡ -/, US also /dɔːˈiːl/ daw-EEL (the diaeresis over the i indicates the two vowels are sounded separately); French: [lɑ̃ɡ dɔjl]) are a dialect continuum that includes standard French and its closest relatives historically spoken in the northern half of France, southern Belgium, and the Channel Islands. They belong to the larger category of Gallo-Romance languages, which also include the historical languages of east-central France and western Switzerland, southern France, portions of northern Italy, the Val d'Aran in Spain, and under certain acceptations those of Catalonia.

Linguists divide the Romance languages of France, and especially of Medieval France, into two main geographical subgroups: the langues d'oïl to the north, and the lengas d'òc in the southern half of France. Both groups are named after the word for yes in their recent ancestral languages. The most common modern langue d'oïl is standard French, in which the ancestral oïl has become oui.

== Terminology ==
Langue d'oïl (in the singular), Oïl dialects and Oïl languages (in the plural) designate the ancient northern Gallo-Romance languages as well as their modern-day descendants. They share many linguistic features, a prominent one being the word oïl for yes. (Oc was and still is the southern word for yes, hence the langue d'oc or Occitan languages). The most widely spoken modern Oïl language is French (oïl was pronounced [o.il] or [o.i], which has become [wi], in modern French oui).

There are three uses of the term oïl:

1. Langue d'oïl
2. Oïl dialects
3. Oïl languages

=== Langue d'oïl ===
In the singular, langue d'oïl refers to the mutually intelligible linguistic variants of lingua romana spoken since the 8th century in northern France and southern Belgium (Wallonia), since the 10th century in the Channel Islands, and between the 11th and 14th centuries in England (the Anglo-Norman language). Langue d'oïl, the term itself, has been used in the singular since the 12th century to denote this ancient linguistic grouping as a whole. With these qualifiers, langue d'oïl sometimes is used to mean the same as Old French (see History below).

=== Oïl dialects ===
In the plural, Oïl dialects refer to the varieties of the ancient langue d'oïl.

=== Oïl languages ===
Oïl languages are those modern-day descendants that evolved separately from the varieties of the ancient langue d'oïl. Consequently, langues d'oïl today may apply either: to all the modern-day languages of this family except the French language; or to this family including French. "Oïl dialects" or "French dialects" are also used to refer to the Oïl languages except French—as some extant Oïl languages are very close to modern French. Because the term dialect is sometimes considered pejorative, the trend today among French linguists is to refer to these languages as langues d'oïl rather than dialects.

== Varieties ==
Five zones of partially mutually intelligible Oïl dialects have been proposed by Pierre Bec:

The area of langues d'oïl can be seen in shades of green and yellow

=== Franconian zone (zone francique) ===
- Picard
- Walloon
- Lorrain
- Northern Norman (spoken north of the Joret line) including: Anglo-Norman; Dgèrnésiais (spoken in Guernsey), Jèrriais (spoken in Jersey), Auregnais (spoken in Alderney), Sercquiais (spoken in Sark)
- Eastern Champenois
- Moselle Romance †

=== Francien zone (zone francienne) ===
- Parisian (was the basis for Standard French)
- Orléanais
- Tourangeau, not to be confused with the French language in Touraine
- Berrichon
- Bourbonnais
- Western Champenois (or Eastern Francien)

=== Burgundian zone (zone burgonde) ===
- Bourguignon
- Franc-Comtois

=== Armorican zone (zone armoricaine) ===
- Eastern Armorican: Angevin; Mayennais; Manceau (Sarthois and Percheron); Southern Norman (spoken south of the Joret line)
- Western Armorican: Gallo

Gallo has a stronger Celtic substrate from Breton. Gallo originated from the oïl speech of people from eastern and northern regions: Anjou; Maine (Mayenne and Sarthe); and Normandy; who were in contact with Breton speakers in Upper Brittany. See Marches of Neustria

=== Poitevin-Saintongeais zone (zone poitevine and zone saintongeaise) ===
Named after the former provinces of Poitou and Saintonge

- Poitevin
- Saintongeais

== Development ==
For the history of phonology, orthography, syntax and morphology, see History of the French language and the relevant individual Oïl language articles.

Each of the Oïl languages has developed in its own way from the common ancestor, and division of the development into periods varies according to the individual histories. Modern linguistics uses the following terms:

- 9th–13th centuries
  - Old French
  - Old Norman
  - etc.
- French
  - Middle French for the period 14th–15th centuries
  - 16th century: français renaissance (Renaissance French)
  - 17th to 18th century: français classique (Classical French)

== History ==
=== Romana lingua ===
In the 9th century, romana lingua (the term used in the Oaths of Strasbourg of 842) was the first of the Romance languages to be recognized by its speakers as a distinct language, probably because it was the most different from Latin compared with the other Romance languages (see History of the French language).

Many of the developments that are now considered typical of Walloon appeared between the 8th and 12th centuries. Walloon "had a clearly defined identity from the beginning of the thirteenth century". In any case, linguistic texts from the time do not mention the language, even though they mention others in the Oïl family, such as Picard and Lorrain. During the 15th century, scribes in the region called the language "Roman" when they needed to distinguish it. It is not until the beginning of the 16th century that we find the first occurrence of the word "Walloon" in the same linguistic sense that we use it today.

=== Langue d'oïl ===
By late- or post-Roman times Vulgar Latin within France had developed two distinctive terms for signifying assent (yes): hoc ille ("this (is) it") and hoc ("this"), which became oïl and oc, respectively. Subsequent development changed "oïl" into "oui", as in modern French. The term langue d'oïl itself was first used in the 12th century, referring to the Old French linguistic grouping noted above. In the 14th century, the Italian poet Dante mentioned the yes distinctions in his De vulgari eloquentia. He wrote in Medieval Latin: "nam alii oc, alii si, alii vero dicunt oil" ("some say 'oc', others say 'sì', others say 'oïl'")—thereby distinguishing at least three classes of Romance languages: oc languages (in southern France); si languages (in Italy and Iberia) and oïl languages (in northern France).

Other Romance languages derive their word for "yes" from the classical Latin sic 'thus', such as the Italian sì, Spanish and Catalan sí, Portuguese sim, and even French si (used when contradicting another's negative assertion). Sardinian is an exception in that its word for "yes", eja, is from neither origin. Similarly Romanian uses da for "yes", which is of Slavic origin.

However, neither lingua romana nor langue d'oïl referred, at their respective time, to a single homogeneous language but to mutually intelligible linguistic varieties. In those times, spoken languages in Western Europe were not codified (except Latin and Medieval Latin), the region's population was considerably lower than today, and population centers were more isolated from each other. As a result, mutually intelligible linguistic varieties were referred to as one language.

=== French (Old French/Standardized Oïl) or lingua Gallicana ===
In the 13th century these varieties were recognized and referred to as dialects ("idioms") of a single language, the langue d'oïl. However, since the previous centuries a common literary and juridical "interdialectary" langue d'oïl had emerged, a kind of koiné. In the late 13th century this common langue d'oïl was named French (françois in French, lingua gallica or gallicana in Medieval Latin). Both aspects of "dialects of a same language" and "French as the common langue d'oïl" appear in a text of Roger Bacon, Opus maius, who wrote in Medieval Latin but translated thus: "Indeed, idioms of a same language vary amongst people, as it occurs in the French language which varies in an idiomatic manner amongst the French, Picards, Normans and Burgundians. And terms right to the Picards horrify the Burgundians as much as their closer neighbours the French".

It is from this period though that definitions of individual Oïl languages are first found. The Picard language is first referred to by name as "langage pikart" in 1283 in the Livre Roisin. The author of the Vie du bienheureux Thomas Hélye de Biville refers to the Norman character of his writing. The Sermons poitevins of around 1250 show the Poitevin language developing as it straddled the line between oïl and oc.

As a result, in modern times the term langue d'oïl also refers to that Old French which was not as yet named French but was already—before the late 13th century—used as a literary and juridical interdialectary language.

The term Francien is a linguistic neologism coined in the 19th century to name the hypothetical variant of Old French allegedly spoken by the late 14th century in the ancient province of Pays de France—the then Paris region later called Île-de-France. This Francien, it is claimed, became the Medieval French language. Current linguistic thinking mostly discounts the Francien theory, although it is still often quoted in popular textbooks. The term francien was never used by those people supposed to have spoken the variant; but today the term could be used to designate that specific 10th-and-11th centuries variant of langue d'oïl spoken in the Paris region; both variants contributed to the koine, as both were called French at that time.

=== Rise of French (Standardized Oïl) versus other Oïl languages ===
For political reasons it was in Paris and Île-de-France that this koiné developed from a written language into a spoken language. As early as the 12th century, Conon de Béthune reported the French court blaming him for using words particular to Artois.

By the late 13th century the written koiné had begun to turn into a spoken and written standard language, and was named French. From that point on, French started to be imposed on the other Oïl dialects as well as on the territories of langue d'oc. However, the Oïl dialects and langue d'oc continued contributing to the lexis of French.

In 1539 the French language was imposed by the Ordinance of Villers-Cotterêts. It required Latin be replaced in judgements and official acts and deeds. The local Oïl languages had always been the language spoken in justice courts. The Ordinance of Villers-Cotterêts did not intend to make French a national language, merely a chancery language for law and administration. Although there were competing literary standards among the Oïl languages in the medieval period, the centralisation of the French kingdom and its influence even outside its formal borders sent most of the Oïl languages into comparative obscurity for several centuries. The development of literature in this new language encouraged writers to use French rather than their own regional languages. This led to the decline of vernacular literature.

It was the French Revolution which imposed French on the people as the official language throughout the territory of France. As the influence of French (and in the Channel Islands, English) spread among sectors of provincial populations, cultural movements arose to study and standardise the vernacular languages. From the 18th century and into the 20th century, societies were founded (such as the "Société liégoise de Littérature wallonne" in 1856), dictionaries (such as George Métivier's Dictionnaire franco-normand of 1870) were published, groups were formed and literary movements developed to support and promote the Oïl languages faced with competition. The Third Republic sought to modernise France and established primary education where the only language recognised was French. Regional languages were discouraged, and the use of French was seen as aspirational, accelerating their decline. This was also generally the case in areas where Oïl languages were spoken. French is now the best-known of the Oïl languages.

== Literature ==
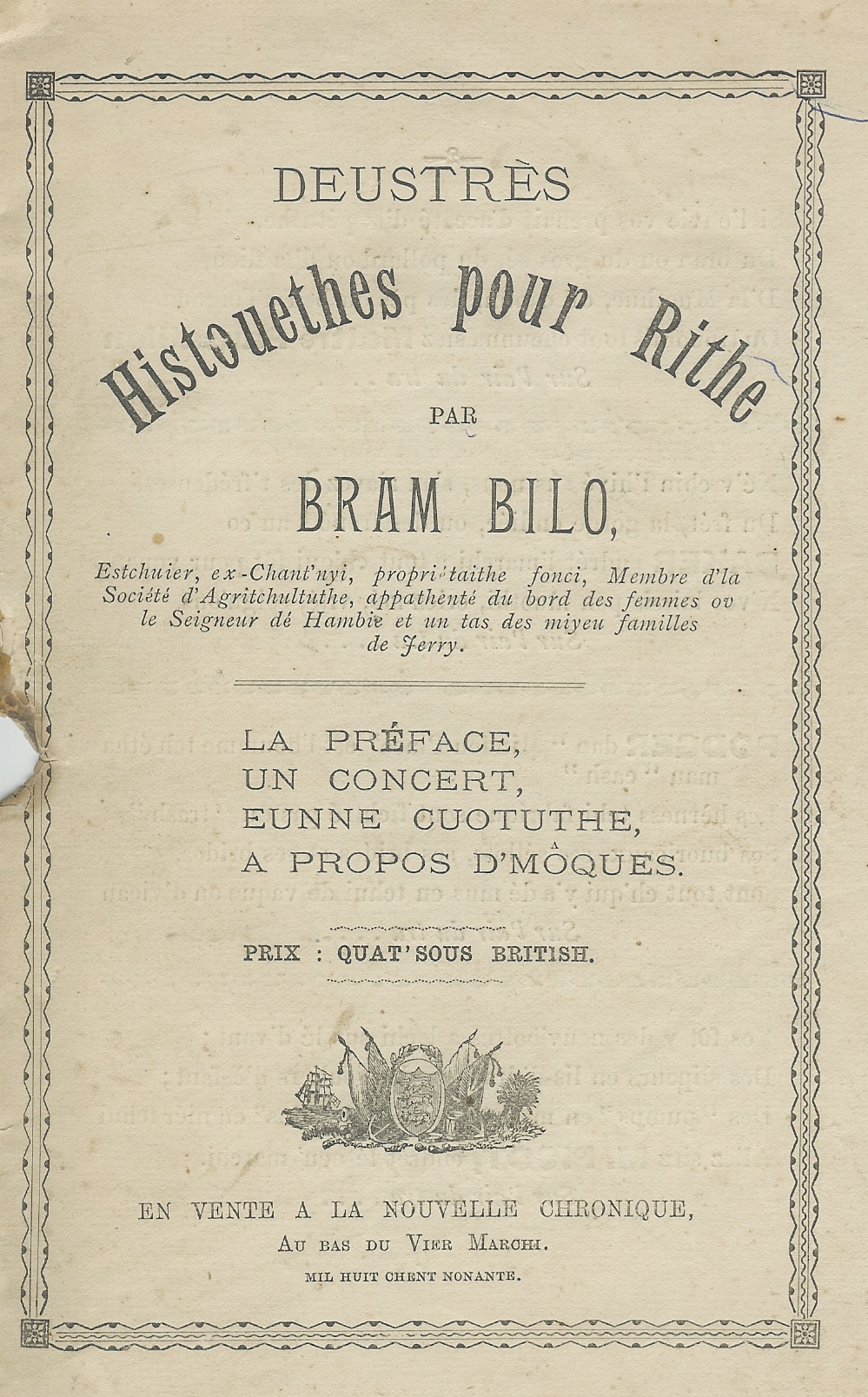
The Oïl languages have literary traditions, as for example seen in this 19th-century collection of Jèrriais short stories

Besides the influence of French literature, small-scale literature has survived in the other Oïl languages. Theatrical writing is most notable in Picard (which maintains a genre of vernacular marionette theatre), Poitevin and Saintongeais. Oral performance (story-telling) is a feature of Gallo, for example, while Norman and Walloon literature, especially from the early 19th century tend to focus on written texts and poetry (see, for example, Wace and Jèrriais literature).

As the vernacular Oïl languages were displaced from towns, they have generally survived to a greater extent in rural areas - hence a preponderance of literature relating to rural and peasant themes. The particular circumstances of the self-governing Channel Islands developed a lively strain of political comment, and the early industrialisation in Picardy led to survival of Picard in the mines and workshops of the regions. The mining poets of Picardy may be compared with the tradition of rhyming Weaver Poets of Ulster Scots in a comparable industrial milieu.

There are some regional magazines, such as Ch'lanchron (Picard), Le Viquet (Norman), Les Nouvelles Chroniques du Don Balleine (Jèrriais), and El Bourdon (Walloon), which are published either wholly in the respective Oïl language or bilingually with French. These provide a platform for literary writing.

== Status ==
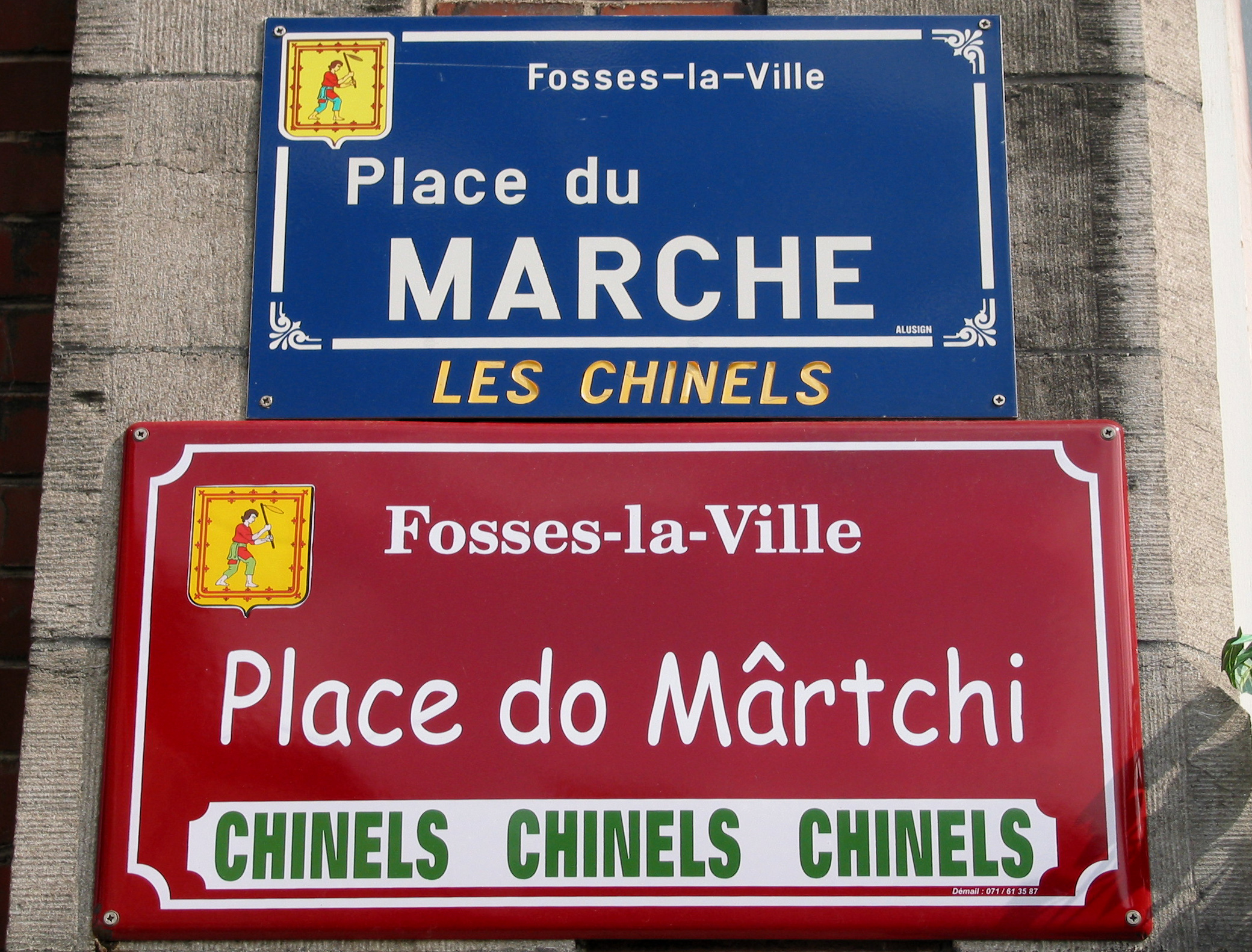
Bilingual street sign for market square in French and Walloon

Apart from French, an official language in many countries (see list), the Oïl languages have enjoyed little status in recent times.

The Norman languages of the Channel Islands enjoy a certain status under the governments of their Bailiwicks and within the regional and lesser-used language framework of the British-Irish Council. The Anglo-Norman language, a variant of Norman once the official language of England, today holds mostly a place of ceremonial honour in the United Kingdom (now referred to as Law French).

The French government recognises the Oïl languages as languages of France, but the Constitutional Council of France barred ratification of the European Charter for Regional or Minority Languages.

The French Community of Belgium recognized certain Oïl languages spoken in Wallonia, such as Champenois, Lorrain (Gaumais), Picard and Walloon.

== Influence ==
The langues d'oïl were more or less influenced by the native languages of the conquering Germanic tribes, notably the Franks. This was apparent not so much in the vocabulary (which remained overwhelmingly of Latin origin) as in the phonology and syntax; the invading Franks, Burgundians and Normans became the rulers and their accents were imposed as standard on the rest of the population. This accounts in large part for the relative distinctiveness of French compared to other Romance languages.

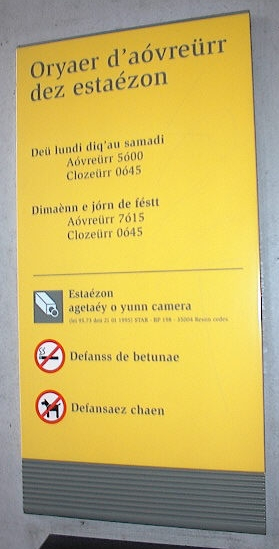
Signage in Gallo in the metro of Rennes

The English language was heavily influenced by contact with Norman following the Norman Conquest and much of the adopted vocabulary shows typically Norman features.

Portuguese was heavily influenced by more than a millennium of perennial contact with several dialects of both Oïl and Occitan language groups, in lexicon (up to 15–20% in some estimates, at least 5000 word roots), phonology and orthography. The influence of Occitan was, nevertheless, the most marked, through the status Provençal in particular achieved in southwestern Europe around the troubadour apex in the Middle Ages, when Galician-Portuguese lyric was developed. Aside the direct influence of Provençal literature, the presence of languages from modern-day France in the Galician-Portuguese area was also strong due to the rule of the House of Burgundy, the establishment of the Orders of Cluny and Cister, the many sections of the Way of St. James pilgrimage route that come from elsewhere in Europe out of the Iberian Peninsula, and the settlement in Iberia of people from the other side of the Pyrenees, arriving during and after the Reconquista.

The anti-Portuguese factor of Brazilian nationalism in the 19th century led to an increased use of the French language in detriment of Portuguese, as France was seen at the time as a model of civilization and progress. The learning of French has historically been important and strong among the Lusophone elites, and for a great span of time it was also the foreign language of choice among the middle class of both Portugal and Brazil, only surpassed in the globalised postmodernity by English.

The French spoken in Belgium shows some influence from Walloon.

The development of French in North America was influenced by the speech of settlers originating from northwestern France, many of whom introduced features of their Oïl varieties into the French they spoke. (See also French language in the United States, French language in Canada)

== Languages and dialects with significant Oïl influence ==
- all regional languages spoken in France, Belgium, and Luxembourg
- Limburgish, particularly Maastrichtian
- all French-based creole languages
- Anglic languages (Oïl influences on vocabulary, transmitted via the Anglo-Norman language spoken by the upper classes in England in the centuries following the Norman Conquest, and later from French)
- Portuguese (Oïl and Occitan influences on lexicon, phonology—especially European, Macanese and Europeanized Brazilian and African dialects—, and orthography)
- Franco-Italian, a mixed language of Old French and Venetian or Lombard used in literary works of northern Italy in the 13th and 14th centuries.

== See also ==
- Moselle Romance, an extinct Romance speech, most likely a langue d'oïl
- Old French
- Bartsch's law
- Occitan
- Language policy of France

== Bibliography ==
- Paroles d'Oïl, Défense et promotion des Langues d'Oïl, Mougon 1994, ISBN 2-905061-95-2
- Les langues régionales, Jean Sibille, 2000, ISBN 2-08-035731-X
