= Poitevin–Saintongeais =

Oïl language of France

- poetevin–séntunjhaes
- Native to: France
- Region: Pays de la Loire; Nouvelle-Aquitaine
- Native speakers: 200,000–300,000 (2017)
- Language family: Indo-European: Italic; Latino-Faliscan; Latinic; Romance; Italo-Western; Western; Gallo-Iberian; Gallo-Romance; Gallo-Rhaetian?; Arpitan–Oïl; Oïl; Poitevin–Saintongeais
- Early forms: Old Latin: Vulgar Latin; Proto-Romance; Old Gallo-Romance; Old French
- Dialects: Saintongeais; Poitevin

Language codes
- ISO 639-3: –
- Glottolog: poit1240 Poitevin sant1407 Santongeais
- Linguasphere: 51-AAA-ha
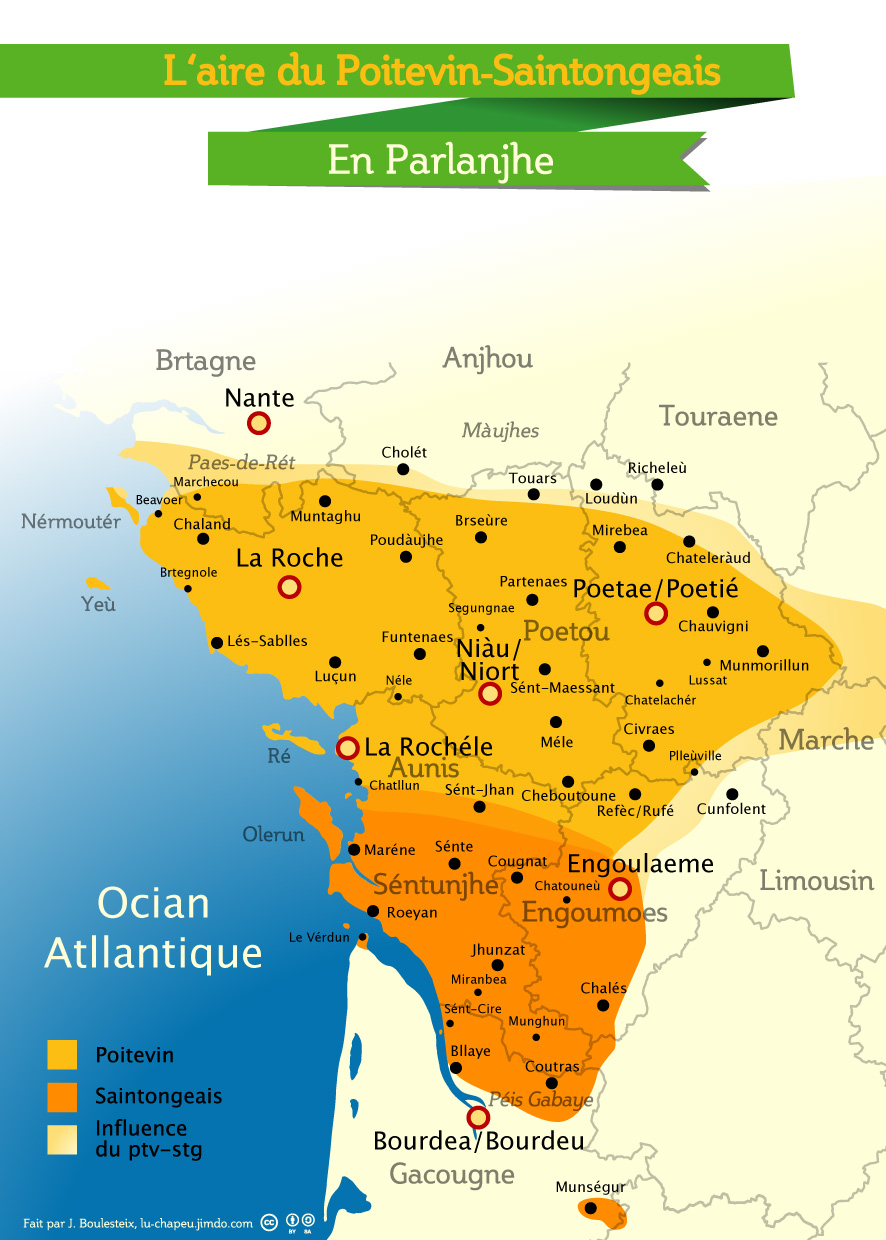
- The Poitevin-Saintongeais-speaking area

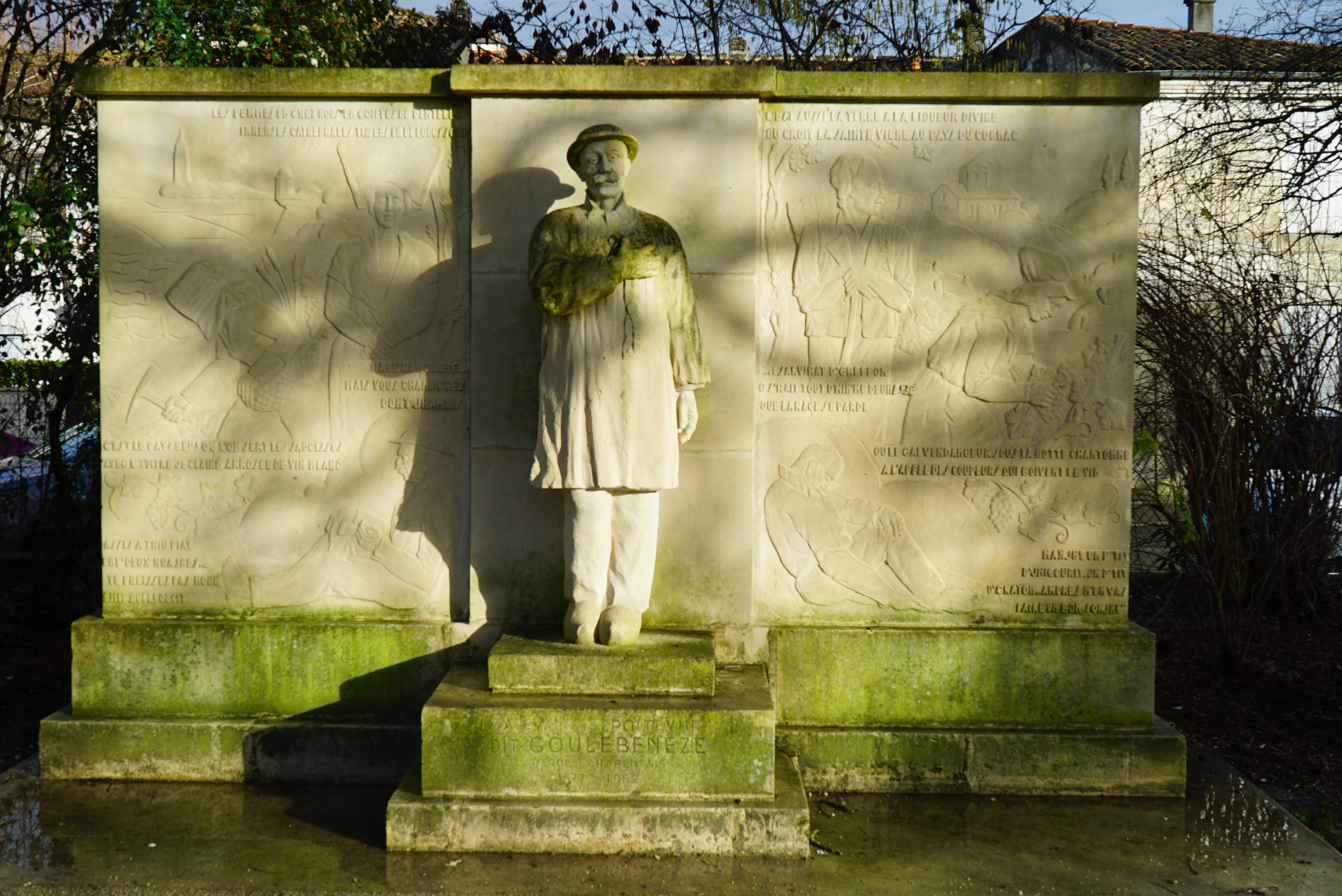
Statue of Evariste Poitevin, a poet who wrote in Poitevin–Saintongeais

Poitevin–Saintongeais (French pronunciation: [pwatvɛ̃ sɛ̃tɔ̃ʒɛ]; endonym: poetevin-séntunjhaes; also called Parlanjhe, Aguiain or Aguiainais in French) is a language spoken in the regions of the Pays de la Loire and Nouvelle-Aquitaine. Poitevin–Saintongeais is officially recognised by the French Ministry of Culture as a language with two dialects: Poitevin and Saintongeais. The language belongs to the langues d'oïl subbranch of the Gallo-Romance languages.

Some descendants of Poitevin–Saintongeais speakers became the Acadian people of Atlantic Canada as well as the Cajun people of Louisiana.

The dialects of this language are peculiar to the historical regions and provinces of Poitou and Saintonge. It is classified as severely endangered by UNESCO.
