= Poitevin dialect =

Oïl language spoken in Poitou, France

Poitevin
- poetevin, parlanjhe
- Native to: France
- Region: Poitou
- Language family: Indo-European: Italic; Latino-Faliscan; Latinic; Romance; Italo-Western; Western; Gallo-Iberian; Gallo-Romance; Gallo-Rhaetian?; Arpitan–Oïl; Oïl; Poitevin–Saintongeais zone; Poitevin

Language codes
- ISO 639-3: –
- Glottolog: poit1240
- ELP: Poitevin
- Linguasphere: 51-AAA-ha
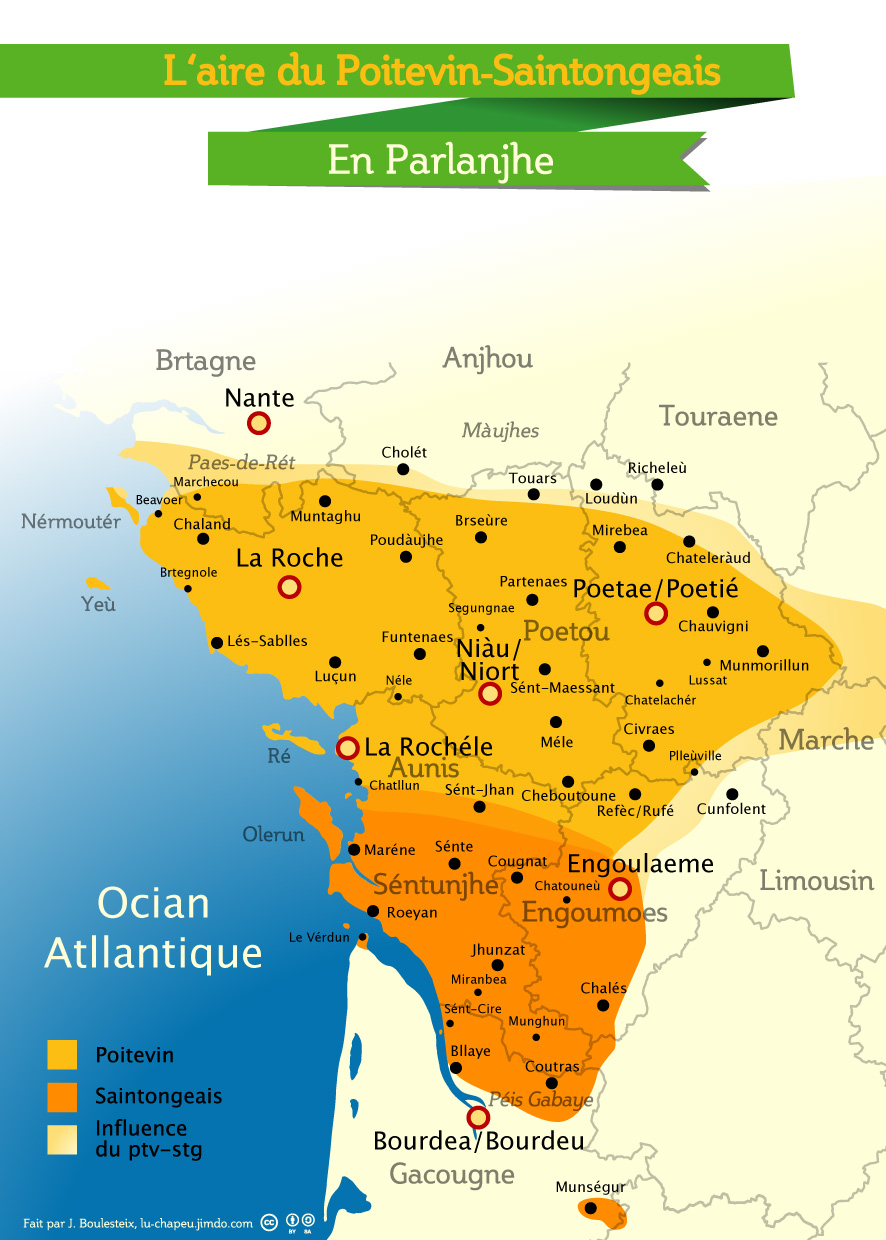
- The Poitevin-speaking area

Poitevin (French pronunciation: [pwat(ə)vɛ̃]; endonym: poetevin) is a dialect of Poitevin–Saintongeais, one of the regional languages of France, spoken in the historical province of Poitou, now administratively divided between Pays de la Loire (Loire countries) and Nouvelle-Aquitaine (New Aquitaine). It is not as commonly spoken as it once was, as the standard form of French now predominates. Poitevin is now classified as one of the langues d'oïl but is distinguished by certain features adopted from Occitan (lenga d'òc).

The language is spoken on what was the border between the two language families of oïl and oc (placenames in the region clearly show historical settlement of oc speakers). The langue d’oïl subsequently spread south, absorbing oc features.

Poitevin is also widely referred to as parlanjhe (the language). François Rabelais wrote that he learned this dialect, along with many other languages and dialects, since he was educated in Fontenay-le-Comte. François Villon spoke some Poitevin as well.

The earliest attested written use of the language is in charters and legal documents dating from the 13th century; people who spoke it were known as the Poitevins. The earliest printed text is dated 1554 (La Gente Poitevinrie). A tradition of theatrical writing and dramatic monologues for performance typifies the literary output in the language, although from the 19th century and in the 20th century (especially with the publication of a weekly paper Le Subiet from 1901) regular journalistic production was also established. Geste Editions publishes a number of books in/about the Poitevin–Santongeais language. Some linguists assert that the Serments de Strasbourg, the first text in French according to the official state position in France, were actually written in Poitevin.

In 1973, a standard orthography was proposed.

The easternmost part of the Poitou région is home to a minority of Occitan-speakers.
