= Burgundian language (Oïl) =

Oïl language of Burgundy, France

Burgundian
- bregognon
- Native to: France
- Region: Burgundy
- Native speakers: (50,000 have some knowledge of the language cited 1988); 20,000 (2022)
- Language family: Indo-European: Italic; Latino-Faliscan; Latinic; Romance; Italo-Western; Western; Gallo-Iberian; Gallo-Romance; Gallo-Rhaetian?; Arpitan–Oïl; Oïl; Burgundian zone; Burgundian
- Early forms: Old Latin: Vulgar Latin; Proto-Romance; Old Gallo-Romance; Old French
- Writing system: Latin

Language codes
- ISO 639-3: –
- Glottolog: bour1247
- Linguasphere: & 51-AAA-hl 51-AAA-hk & 51-AAA-hl
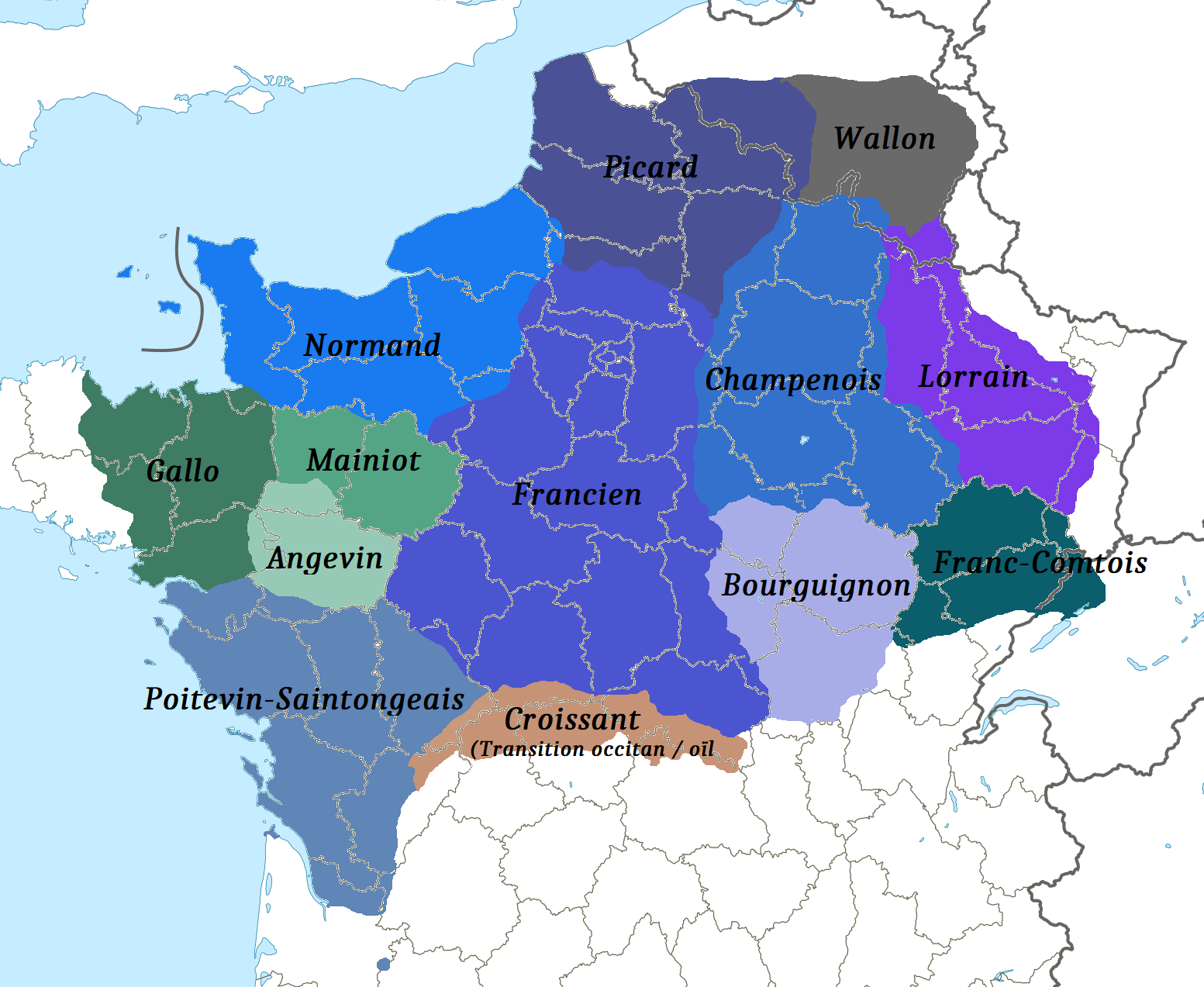
- Situation of Burgundian (in lilac) among the Oïl languages

- Burgundian is classified as Severely Endangered by the UNESCO Atlas of the World's Languages in Danger.

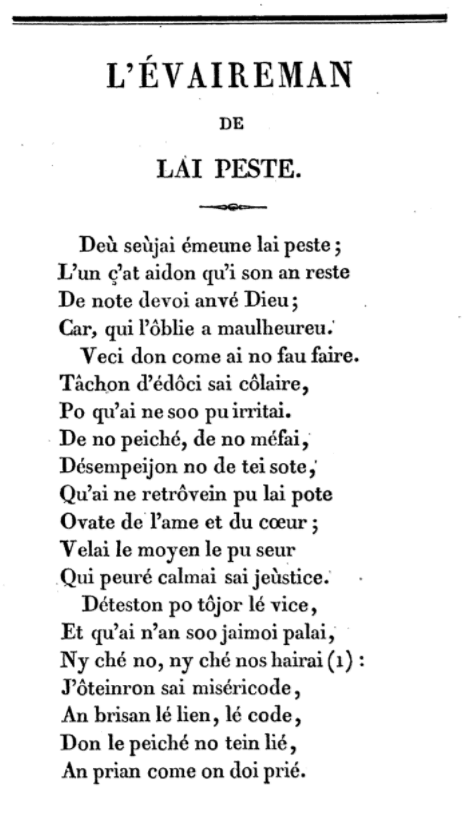
Poem in Burgundian by Aymé Piron (1640–1727)

The Burgundian language, also known by French names Bourguignon-morvandiau, Bourguignon, and Morvandiau, is an Oïl language spoken in Burgundy and particularly in the Morvan area of the region.

The arrival of the Burgundians brought Germanic elements into the Gallo-Romance speech of the inhabitants. The occupation of the Low Countries by the Dukes of Burgundy also brought Burgundian into contact with Dutch; e.g., the word for gingerbread couque derives from Middle Dutch kooke (cake).

Dialects of the south along the Saône river, such as Brionnais-Charolais, have been influenced by the Arpitan language, which is spoken mainly in a neighbouring area that approximates the heartland of the original Kingdom of Burgundy.

Eugène de Chambure published a Glossaire du Morvan in 1878.

== Literature ==
Apart from songs dating from the eighteenth century, there is little surviving literature from before the nineteenth century. In 1854 the Papal Bull Ineffabilis Deus was translated into the Morvan dialect by the Abbé Jacques-François Baudiau, and into the Dijon dialect by the Abbé Lereuil. The Abbé Baudiau also transcribed storytelling.

Folklorists collected vernacular literature from the mid-nineteenth century and by the end of the century a number of writers were establishing an original literature. Achille Millien (1838–1927) collected songs from the oral tradition in the Nivernais. Louis de Courmont, nicknamed the "Botrel of the Morvan", was a chansonnier who after a career in Paris returned to his native region. A statue was erected to him in Château-Chinon. Emile Blin wrote a number of stories and monologues aimed at a tourist market; a collection was published in 1933 under the title Le Patois de Chez Nous. Alfred Guillaume published a large number of vernacular texts for use on picturesque postcards at the beginning of the twentieth century, and in 1923 published a book in Burgundian, L'âme du Morvan. More recently, Marinette Janvier published Ma grelotterie (1974) and Autour d'un teugnon (1989).
