= Champenois language =

Oïl language of France and Belgium

Champenois
- champaignat
- Native to: France, Belgium
- Region: Champagne-Ardenne, Île-de-France (Seine-et-Marne), Namur
- Language family: Indo-European: Italic; Latino-Faliscan; Latinic; Romance; Italo-Western; Western; Gallo-Iberian; Gallo-Romance; Gallo-Rhaetian?; Arpitan–Oïl; Oïl; Francien and Frankish zones; Champenois
- Early forms: Old Latin: Vulgar Latin; Proto-Romance; Old Gallo-Romance; Old French
- Dialects: Eastern; Western

Official status
- Recognised minority language in: French Community of Belgium

Language codes
- ISO 639-3: –
- Glottolog: cham1332
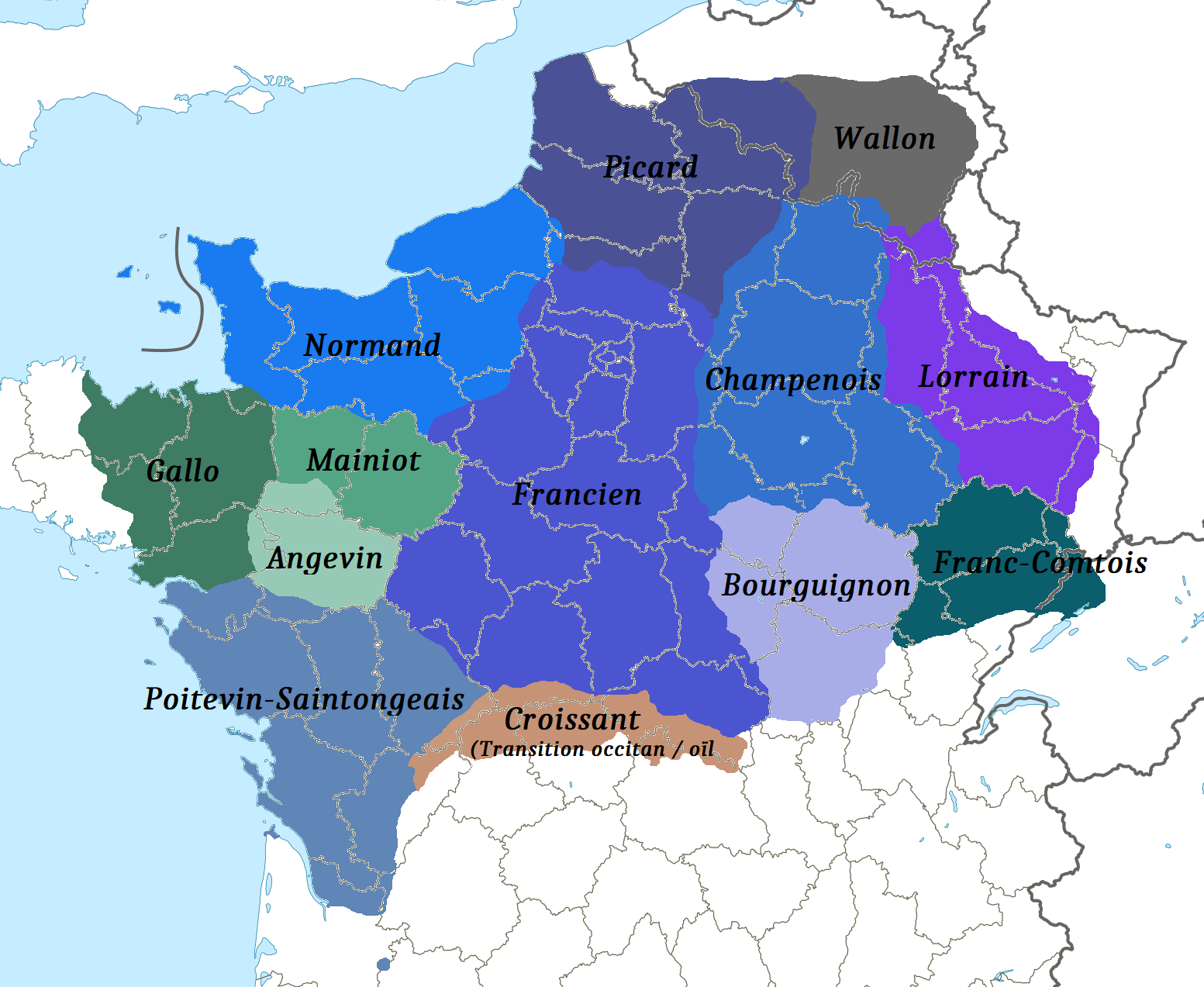
- Situation of Champenois among the Oïl languages.

Champenois (lou champaignat) is a Romance language among the langues d'oïl spoken by a minority of people in Champagne and Île-de-France provinces in France, as well as in a handful of towns in southern Belgium (chiefly the municipality of Vresse-sur-Semois).

While it is classified as a regional language of France, it also has recognized status as a regional language in Wallonia, a region of Belgium. Champenois is considered an endangered language by the UNESCO Red Book of Endangered Languages.

== Literature ==
The language of Chrétien de Troyes is marked by Champenois traits and Rashi used Champenois in his commentaries, but the earliest literature to survive consciously written in Champenois is noted from the end of the 16th century. Le Bontemps de Carnaval de Chaumont was updated and republished in 1660. The language used contrasts the French spoken by the king's messengers with the Champenois of the local inhabitants. A feature of 18th-century Champenois literature was the noëls (Christmas chants), which wove contemporary and local references into pious texts.
