= Moselle Romance =

Extinct Gallo-Romance dialect of the Moselle valley, Germany

- Native to: Germany
- Region: Along the Moselle River near France
- Extinct: 11th century
- Language family: Indo-European: Italic; Latino-Faliscan; Latin; Romance; Italo-Western; Western Romance; Gallo-Iberian; Gallo-Romance; Gallo-Rhaetian?; Arpitan–Oïl?; Oïl?; Moselle Romance
- Early forms: Old Latin: Vulgar Latin; Proto-Romance; Old Gallo-Romance; Old French?

Language codes
- ISO 639-3: –
- Glottolog: None
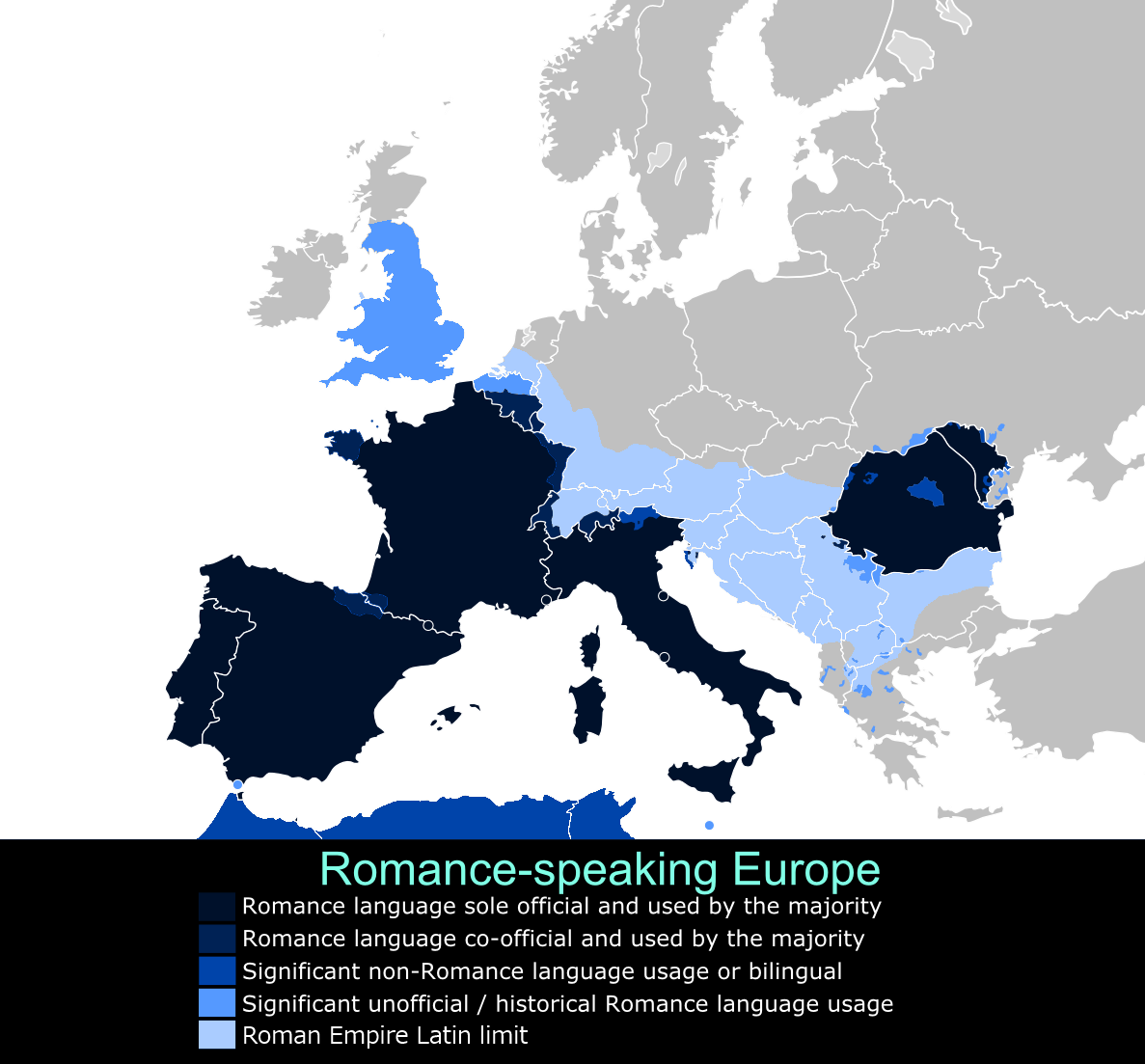
- Map of Latin Europe. The region where Moselle Romance was spoken lies in the light blue area near the current border between Germany and Belgium.

Moselle Romance (German: Moselromanisch; French: Roman de la Moselle) is an extinct Gallo-Romance (most probably langue d'oïl) dialect that developed after the Fall of the Western Roman Empire along the Moselle river in modern-day Germany, near the border with France. It was part of a wider group of Romance relic areas within the German-speaking territory. Despite heavy Germanic influence, it persisted in isolated pockets until at least the 11th century.

== Historical background ==
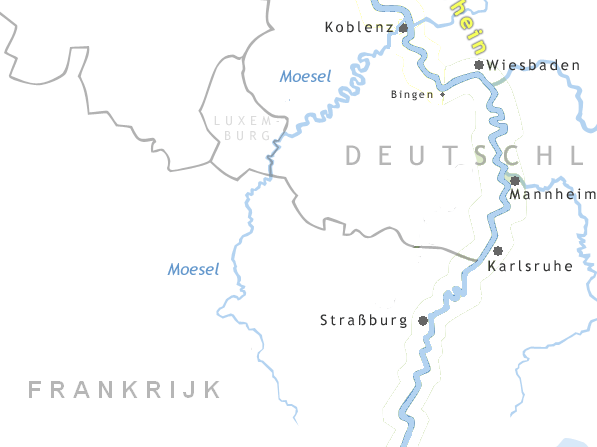
The Moselle Valley

After Julius Caesar conquered Gaul in 50 BC, a Gallo-Roman culture gradually developed in what is today France, southern Belgium, Luxembourg, and the region between Trier and Koblenz. By contrast, the adjacent province of Germania Inferior and part of Germania Superior retained a Germanic character throughout the Imperial period.

== Emergence ==
According to linguist Alberto Varvaro the linguistic frontier between Germanic-speaking and Romance populations around the 13th century was similar to the present language frontier, but only a few years before there still was a "remaining area of neolatin speakers" in the valleys of the Mosella river (near old Roman Treviri).

Probably until the first 1200s some farmers around Trier spoke this Moselle Romance, according to Varvaro.

== Decline ==
The local Gallo-Roman placenames suggest that the left bank of the Moselle was Germanized following the 8th century, but the right bank remained a Romance-speaking island into at least the 11th century.

Said names include Maring-Noviand, Osann-Monzel, Longuich, Riol, Hatzenport, Longkamp, Karden, and Kröv or Alf.

This being a wine-growing region, a number of viticultural terms from Moselle Romance have survived in the local German dialect.

== Evidence in the current local Moselle dialect ==
Despite the complete Germanization of the Romance language island, distinctive Gallo-Roman place names survived. The place name Welschbillig indicates the former presence of the Welschen (Romanized Celts) in the entire region.

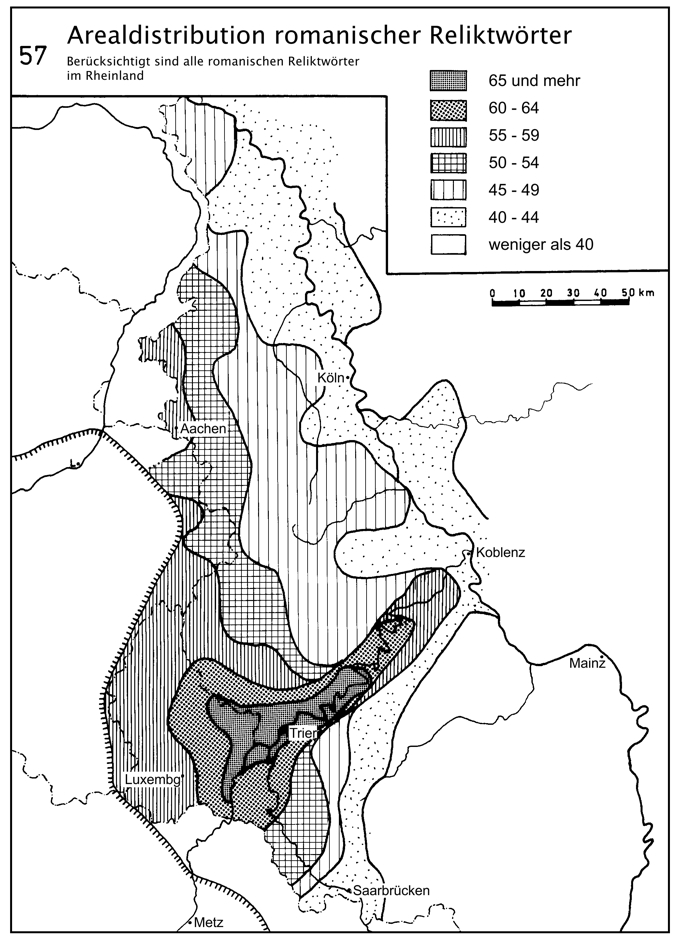
Romance borrowings in the Moselle German dialects. The map shows that they are concentrated around Trier.

In addition to the Gallo-Roman place and field names, the vocabulary of the Moselle dialects also shows a wealth of Roman influences, which can be viewed as reflexes of the Moselle Roman language island. A quantifying cartographic representation of Romanesque relic word areas shows a clear massing of Romanisms in the middle Moselle area up to the Trier area and the lower reaches of the Saar and Sauer. Examples of such words are: Bäschoff 'back container' < bascauda, Even 'oats' < avena, Fräge 'strawberry' < fraga, Gimme ' 'Bud' < gemma, glinnen 'Glean grapes' < glennare, More 'Blackberry' < morum, pauern 'Most filter ' < purare, Präter 'Flurschütz' < pratarius, Pülpes 'Crownfoot' (plant) < pulli pes etc.

== Features ==
The following Late Latin inscription from the sixth century is assumed to show influence from early Moselle Romance, according to Johannes Kramer:

Hoc tetolo fecet Montana, coniux sua, Mauricio, qui visit con elo annus dodece; et portavit annus qarranta; trasit die VIII K(a)l(endas) Iunias.
"For Mauricius his wife Montana who lived with him for twelve years made this gravestone; he was forty years old and died on the 25th of May."

A Latin text from the 9th century written in the monastery of Prüm by local monks contains several Vulgar Latin terms which are attested only in modern Gallo-Romance languages, especially northeastern French and Franco-Provençal, such materiamen 'timber' or porritum 'chives'. Based on evidence from toponyms and loanwords into Moselle Franconian dialects, the latest detectable form of Moselle Romance can be classified as a Langue d'oïl dialect. This can be seen e.g. in the placenames Kasnode < *cassanētu and Roveroth < *roburētu, which display a characteristic change of Vulgar Latin stressed /e/ in open syllables.

== Lingua ignota link possibility ==
Scholars such as D'Ambrosio claim that the lingua ignota of Saint Hildegard of Bingen may be related to the Romance language of the Moselle, although Hildegard's language appears to be an invented medieval Latin. For example, such words as "loifolum" (similar to the Italian "la folla", "the crowd") may show a Neo-Latin origin.

Saint Hildegard (on her preaching trips) was in the Moselle River Valley (present-day Rhineland-Palatinate, Germany) in the last years of the proven existence of this Romance language. In fact the language disappears in the surroundings of Trier (and perhaps also in Strasbourg) during the years of life and preaching of this saint.

== See also ==
- African Romance
- British Latin
- Pannonian Romance
