= Occitan =

Occitan may refer to:

- Something of, from, or related to the Occitania territory in parts of France, Italy, Monaco and Spain.
- Something of, from, or related to the Occitania administrative region of France.
- Occitan language, spoken in parts of France, Italy, Monaco and Spain.
- Occitans, people of France, Italy, Monaco and Spain.
