= Berrichon dialect =

Öil language of Berry, France

Berrichon
- berrichon
- Native to: France
- Region: Berry
- Language family: Indo-European: Italic; Latino-Faliscan; Latinic; Romance; Italo-Western; Western; Gallo-Iberian; Gallo-Romance; Gallo-Rhaetian?; Arpitan–Oïl; Oïl; Francien zone; Berrichon
- Early forms: Old Latin: Vulgar Latin; Proto-Romance; Old Gallo-Romance; Old French

Language codes
- ISO 639-3: –
- Glottolog: berr1239
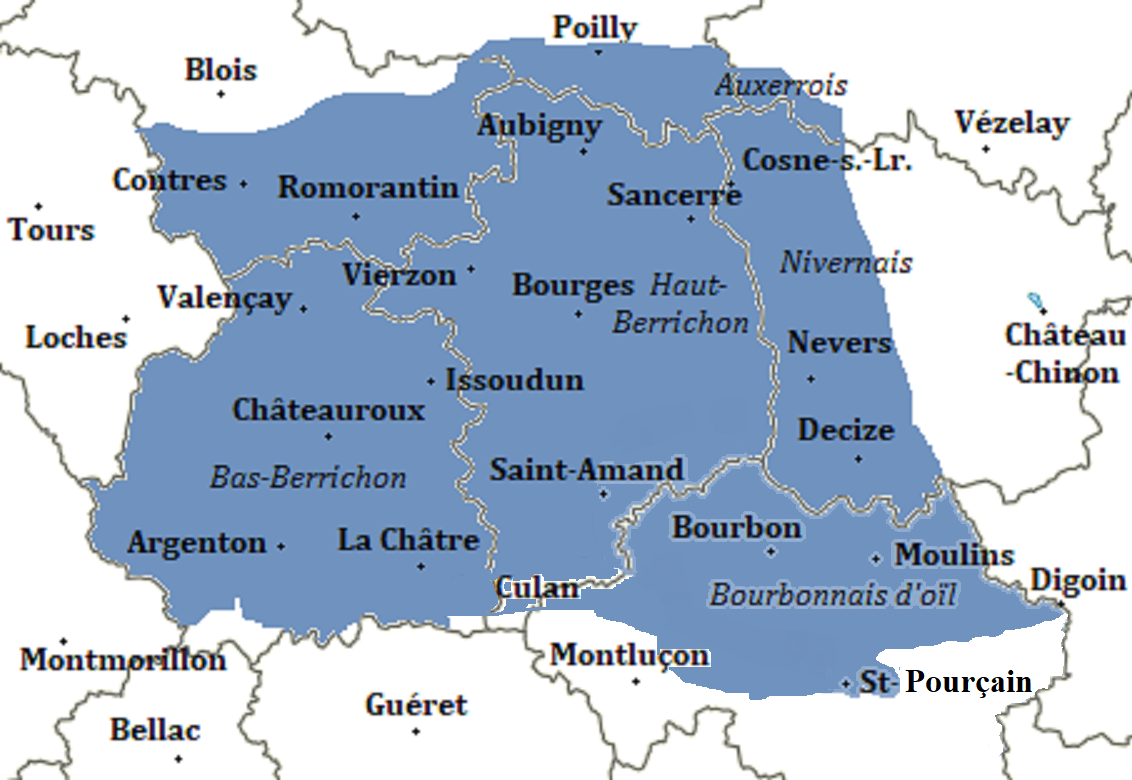

Berrichon (French pronunciation: [beʁiʃɔ̃] or [bɛʁiʃɔ̃]) is an Oïl language very closely related to French or a dialect of it traditionally spoken in the historical area of the French province of Berry. The word is also used as a demonym and as an adjective meaning "pertaining to Berry".

== History ==
The dialect evolved out of the langues d'oïl which evolved during the Middle Ages out of the Vulgar Latin spoken in northern Gaul. Its general use in the Berry region began to decline in the sixteenth century as the local aristocracy and bourgeoisie began to adopt standard French, leaving Berrichon as a "patois" used by the peasantry in the countryside. Subsequent developments, such as the French Revolution, which created a sense of nationalism, and the establishment of free, mandatory, primary education under the Minister of Public Instruction, Jules Ferry, which greatly expanded the teaching of French, further undermined the position of Berrichon.

== Current status ==
The decline of Berrichon has virtually led to it being regarded as a sub-standard dialect of French rather than a separate language. Additionally, as most speakers in its region now speak standard French, it is no longer possible to say that a Berrichon "patois" exists, but rather that a regional version of French does. Nevertheless, traces of Berrichon and its regional varieties remain today. This is exemplified in the continued use of Berrichon terms in spoken French among speakers in the region.

== Phonology and lexicon ==
Although Berrichon does not have an official grammar or pronunciation, there are general rules as to how it differs from French. Berrichon differentiates between closed and open a. Rs are rolled and emphatic. Words which have the o sound in standard French are pronounced with a close back rounded vowel, resulting in, for example, un houmme (man), une poumme (apple). The oi [wa] sound becomes oé [oe]. The suffix -eur becomes -eux in Berrichon, and -eau becomes -iau; therefore, leurs (theirs) is ieux and un seau d'eau (a bucket of water) is un siau d'iau.

Conjugation is also different. The present indicative of the first-person singular, the third-person singular and the third-person plural are all conjugated in the same manner, which results in phrases of the type, "j'menons les oies" ("I lead the geese"). There is also frequent truncation: "i m'nons les oies" ("they lead the geese"). Tense endings are also different from standard French, as in the third person plural imperfect ending -aient is replaced by -aint, e.g., "i's étaint" instead of "ils étaient" ("They used to be").

In Berry, it is customary to precede given names with articles: la for women's names and eul for men's names.

When referring to weather terms, the pronoun ça is used in place of the French il. For example, "Il pleut" (It is raining.) would be "Ça pleut" in Berrichon.

Examples of Berrichon vocabulary being used instead of their French counterparts include:

Berrichon	French(Paris)	English
agouant	pénible	pain in the neck
cagoui	escargot	snail
caqueziau	moustique	mosquito
carroué	carrefour	intersection, crossroads
chian	chien	dog
chieuve	chèvre	goat
ch'tit	mauvais, méchant	bad
daguenettes	pommes/poires séchées	dried apples/pears
ediasse (North), ajasse (South)	pie	magpie
formion, fromion	fourmis	ant
jau	coq	rooster
mainguion	petit repas	light meal
Naud	Noël	Christmas
ouche	jardin (de la maison)	house garden
pal'tau	veste	jacket
patin	pantoufle	slipper
pochon	sac	bag
rag'nasser	faire du bruit	to make noise
s'accutter	s'asseoir	to sit down
tantôt	après-midi	afternoon
s'tantôt	cet après-midi	this afternoon

== Classification ==
The linguistic research network Linguasphere Observatory identifies five dialects of Berrichon.

- Bourbonnais (Allier, Southern Cher)
- Nivernais (Nièvre)
- Auxerrois (West Yonne)
- High-Berrichon (Northern Cher, Eastern Cher)
- Low-Berrichon (Indre and Cher)

In general, current researchers group together Bourbonnais and Berrichon under the name “Berrichon-Bourbonnais”.

The far south of Berry - notably in the Châtaigneraie region - is a part of the “Croissant” linguistic zone, where the langues d’oïl and Occitan languages interact. More specifically, it is linguistically influenced by Berrichon (oïl) and Northern Occitan.

== Sample text ==
Article 1 of the Universal Declaration of Human Rights:

"Tertous euls houmes naquissont libres et parés catté d'la digneté et des drèts. Is tindont d'la radzon et unne aîme et is doévont s'aidier entermi ieux coume des frères."

== See also ==
- Languages of France
- Langues d'oïl
