= Lingua ignota =

12th-century mystical language created by St. Hildegard of Bingen

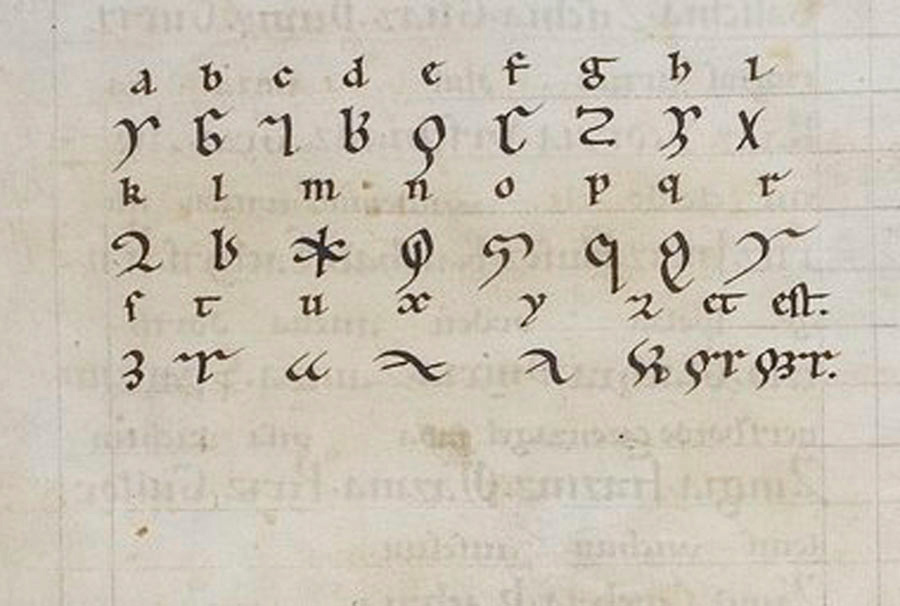
- St. Hildegard's 23 litterae ignotae
- Pronunciation: [ˈlinɡwa iŋˈnoːta]
- Created by: Hildegard of Bingen
- Purpose: Constructed language: artistic language; Lingua ignota

Language codes
- ISO 639-3: None (mis)
- Glottolog: None
- IETF: art-x-ignota

Litterae ignotae
- Script type: Alphabet
- Creator: Hildegard von Bingen
- Period: 12th century
- Direction: Left-to-right
- Language: Lingua ignota

A lingua ignota (Latin for 'unknown language') was described by the 12th-century abbess Hildegard of Bingen, who apparently used it for mystical purposes. It consists of vocabulary with no known grammar; the only known text is individual words embedded in Latin. To write it, Hildegard used an alphabet of 23 letters denominated litterae ignotae (Latin for 'unknown letters').

== History and corpus ==
Hildegard partially described the language in a work titled Ignota lingua per simplicem hominem Hildegardem prolata, which survived in two manuscripts, both dating to c. 1200, the Wiesbaden Codex and a Berlin MS (Lat. Quart. 4º 674), previously Codex Cheltenhamensis 9303, collected by Sir Thomas Phillipps. The text is a glossary of 1011 words in Lingua ignota, with glosses mostly in Latin, sometimes in Middle High German; the words appear to be a priori coinages, mostly nouns with a few adjectives. Grammatically it appears to be a partial relexification of Latin, as in, a code or language formed by substituting new vocabulary into an existing grammar. Many words have ambiguous forms, such as either Zizain or Zizam meaning "dish". Likewise, occasional typos appear in the manuscript, such as glossing Kulzphazur as attavus instead of atavus (ancestor) or Maiz as maler instead of mater (mother). As a personal language, Hildegard does not describe an invented culture or history along with it.

The purpose and creation history of lingua ignota is unknown, and it is not known who, besides its creator, was familiar with it. In the 19th century some believed that Hildegard intended her language to be an ideal, universal language. However, in the 21st century it is assumed that Lingua ignota was devised as a secret language; like Hildegard's "unheard music", she would have attributed it to divine inspiration. To the extent that the language was constructed by Hildegard, it may be considered one of the earliest known constructed languages.

In a letter to Hildegard, her friend and provost Wolmarus, fearing that Hildegard would soon die, asks ubi tunc vox inauditae melodiae? et vox inauditae linguae? (Descemet (1882), p. 346; "where, then, the voice of the unheard melody? And the voice of the unheard language?"), suggesting that the existence of Hildegard's language was known, but there were no initiates who would have preserved its knowledge after her death.

== Sample text ==
The only extant text in the language is the following short passage:

O orzchis Ecclesia, armis divinis praecincta, et hyacinto ornata, tu es caldemia stigmatum loifolum et urbs scienciarum. O, o tu es etiam crizanta in alto sono, et es chorzta gemma.

These two sentences are written mostly in Latin with five key words in Lingua ignota; as only one of these is unambiguously found in the glossary (loifol, "people", a likely portmanteau from German "Leute" and "Volk"), it is clear that the vocabulary was larger than 1011 words. (Higley (2007) finds probable correspondences for two other words.)

"O orzchis Ecclesia, girded with divine arms, and adorned with hyacinth, you are the caldemia of the wounds of the loifols, and the city of sciences. O, o, and you are the crizanta in high sound, and you are the chorzta gem."

Loifol "people" is apparently inflected as a third declension Latin noun, yielding the genitive plural loifolum "of the peoples".

Newman (1987) conjectures the translation:

"O measureless Church, / girded with divine arms / and adorned with jacinth, / you are the fragrance of the wounds of nations / and the city of sciences. / O, o, and you are anointed / amid-noble sound, / and you are a sparkling gem."

== Orthography and phonology ==
Hildegard wrote the language with its own alphabet, Litterae Ignotae, which covers the same letters as the contemporary Latin alphabet rather than any peculiar sounds. The Litterae Ignotae letters also do not appear to have names of their own. Per 1100s Latin writing, the letters ⟨Uu⟩, ⟨Vv⟩, and ⟨Ww⟩ were not distinguished, nor were ⟨Ii⟩ and ⟨Jj⟩. ⟨Qq⟩ has a separate letter, despite rarely appearing in Lingua Ignota words. Additionally, each word takes an initial capital, fitting the way nouns are capitalized in High German. Punctuation is seldom seen and not described.

Modern latinizations often write ⟨Vv⟩ and ⟨Jj⟩ before a vowel but ⟨Uu⟩ and ⟨Ii⟩ elsewhere. Doubled ⟨Uu⟩ or ⟨Vv⟩ is common and is frequently transliterated as ⟨Ww⟩. Other writers use conventions of the time (writing ⟨Vv⟩ initially and ⟨Uu⟩ elsewhere), while some use ⟨Ii⟩ and ⟨Uu⟩ or ⟨Vv⟩ in all cases. The use ⟨Vv⟩, ⟨Ww⟩, and ⟨Jj⟩ before consonants is not clear, nor are sequences of ⟨uv⟩ as opposed to ⟨w⟩. Texts here are written ⟨Ii⟩ and ⟨Uu⟩ for simplicity.

Hildegard never described the pronunciation of the language but seemingly follows conventions of her native Middle High German. This includes using the letter ⟨Zz⟩ much more than ⟨Ss⟩, consistent digraphs ending in -h, and use of consonant clusters in multiple parts of a word. Lingua Ignota ⟨Zz⟩ could have represented /s/~/z/ or /ts/; perhaps all of the above depending on the word. ⟨Ss⟩ in turn likely represents something like /ʂ/ or /ʃ/. Overall, however, what sounds are represented by each letter and in which word is often unclear.

Lingua Ignota uses frequent multigraphs such as ⟨sch⟩, ⟨th⟩, ⟨ph⟩, ⟨sz⟩, ⟨ei⟩, among others. It is not clear how many denoted unique sounds not covered by the standard alphabet, nor if any sounded the same as specific single letters or other multigraphs. Like the singular letters, their consistency in pronunciation is not known.

== Vocabulary ==
The glossary is in a hierarchical order (scala naturae), first giving terms for God and angels, followed by terms for human beings and terms for family relationships, followed by terms for body-parts, illnesses, religious and worldly ranks, craftsworkers, days, months, clothing, household items, plants, and a few birds and insects. Terms for mammals are absent (except for the bat, Ualueria, and the legendary half-mammal gryphon Argumzio, both listed among the birds). Also lacking are most adjectives, numbers, and grammatical terms, as well as any verbs, adverbs, pronouns, or function words.

The first 30 entries are (after Roth (1895)):

| No. | Lingua ignota | Latin | English |
|---|---|---|---|
| 1 | Aigonz | deus | God |
| 2 | Aieganz | angelus | angel |
| 3 | Zuuenz | sanctus | saint |
| 4 | Liuionz | salvator | savior |
| 5 | Diueliz | diabolus | devil |
| 6 | Ispariz | spiritus | spirit |
| 7 | Inimois | homo | human being |
| 8 | Iur | vir | man |
| 9 | Uanix | femina | woman |
| 10 | Peuearrez | patriarcha | patriarch |
| 11 | Korzinthio | propheta | prophet |
| 12 | Falschin | vates | soothsayer |
| 13 | Sonziz | apostolus | apostle |
| 14 | Linschiol | martir | martyr |
| 15 | Zanziuer | confessor | confessor |
| 16 | Urizoil | virgo | virgin |
| 17 | Iugiza | vidua | widow |
| 18 | Pangizo | penitens | penitent |
| 19 | Kulzphazur | atavus | ancestor |
| 20 | Phazur | avus | grandfather |
| 21 | Peueriz | pater | father |
| 22 | Maiz | mater | mother |
| 23 | Hilzpeueriz | nutricus | stepfather |
| 24 | Hilzmaiz | noverca | stepmother |
| 25 | Scirizin | filius | son |
| 26 | Hilzscifriz | privignus | stepson |
| 27 | Limzkil | infans | infant |
| 28 | Zains | puer | boy |
| 29 | Zunzial | juvenis | youth |
| 30 | Bischiniz | adolescens | adolescent |

Nominal composition may be observed in many words: peueriz "father" → hilz-peueriz "stepfather", maiz "mother" → hilz-maiz "stepmother", and scirizin "son" → hilz-scifriz "stepson". Suffixal derivation can be seen in peueriz "father" → pevearrez "patriarch". As with the orthography, Middle High German influence is evident, such as the word "grandfather" begetting the word for "ancestor": phazur → kulz-phazur.

A few terms have more than one Lingua Ignota word assigned to them, such as abiza and comizaz both meaning "house". Whether there is any distinction in use and what kind is not made clear.

== Editions ==
- Grimm (1848), listing only the 291 glosses with German translations.
- Roth (1895), consisting of the 1011 glosses.
- Descemet (1882) listing only the 181 glosses giving the names of plants.
- Portmann & Odermatt (1986)
- Higley (2007), Hildegard of Bingen's Unknown Language: An Edition, Translation, and Discussion, the entire Riesencodex glossary, with additions from the Berlin MS, translations into English, and extensive commentary.

== See also ==
- Hiberno-Latin, a learned style of literary Latin spread by Irish monks during the period from the sixth century to the tenth century. It used unusual words and loanwords from Greek, Hebrew and Irish.
- Hermeneutic style, a style of Latin in the later Roman and early medieval periods characterized by the extensive use of unusual and arcane words, especially derived from Greek.
- Moselle Romance, an extinct Gallo-Romance language spoken in the region, with pockets surviving into the 11th century, to which lingua ignota is hypothesized to have links.
- Glossolalia
- Artistic language
- Philosophical language
