= Frantz Brunet =

- Born: 27 August 1879; Franchesse (Allier)
- Died: 26 July 1965 (aged 85)
- Occupation: Linguist

Frantz Brunet (27 August 1879 – 26 July 1965) was a French linguist.

A professor at the Normal school at Moulins from 1905 to 1920, he was later an inspector for primary schools in Saône-et-Loire.

His main work is the Dictionnaire du parler bourbonnais et des régions voisines (Paris, 1964), reprinted in 1983 and 2002. He also wrote two little works on Charles Peguy, of whom he was an admirer.

== Bibliography ==
- Pierre Perrin, « La vie et l'œuvre de Frantz Brunet », Cahiers bourbonnais, 1966, n°37, (p. 12–15).
- Jean Émile-Guillaumin, « Souvenir sur Frantz Brunet », Bulletin de la Société d'émulation du Bourbonnais, 64, 1er trimestre 1988, (p. 70–74).
