= Francien language =

Former dialect of the French language

Francien
- françoys, françois
- Pronunciation: Old French pronunciation: [frãnˈs(w)ɛ]
- Native to: France
- Region: Île-de-France
- Era: Prior to French Revolution and Standard French
- Language family: Indo-European: Italic; Latino-Faliscan; Latin; Romance; Italo-Western; Western Romance; Gallo-Iberian; Gallo-Romance; Gallo-Rhaetian?; Arpitan–Oïl; Oïl; Francien
- Early forms: Old Latin: Vulgar Latin; Proto-Romance; Old Gallo-Romance; Old French

Language codes
- ISO 639-3: –
- Glottolog: None
- IETF: fro-u-sd-fridf

Francien (French pronunciation: [fʁɑ̃sjɛ̃]), also anglicized as Francian (/ˈfrænsiən/), is a 19th-century term in linguistics that was applied to the French dialect that was spoken during the Middle Ages in the regions of Île-de-France (with Paris at its centre), Orléanais, as well as Touraine, Berry, and Bourbonnais before the establishment of the French language as a standard language.

According to one theory of the development of French, Francien was chosen out of all the competing oïl languages as an official language (Norman and Picard being the main competitors in the medieval period). The theory currently prevailing, however, is that Francien was one of the dialects in the dialect continuum on top of which an administrative language, untrammeled by perceived regionalisms, was imposed as a compromise means of communication and record to replace Latin.

The existence and definition of Francien were put forward in the 19th century, partly to support the idea of the French language as enjoying a direct and pure lineage from Latin and to minimize the contributions of the various Romance languages of France. Nowadays, the question of Francien is a controversial topic in discussions of language policy in France.

== See also ==
- Old French
- Ordinance of Villers-Cotterêts
- Jordain de Blaivies, a chanson de geste in this dialect
