= Old Gallo-Romance =

Romance language spoken from the 6th to 8th centuries

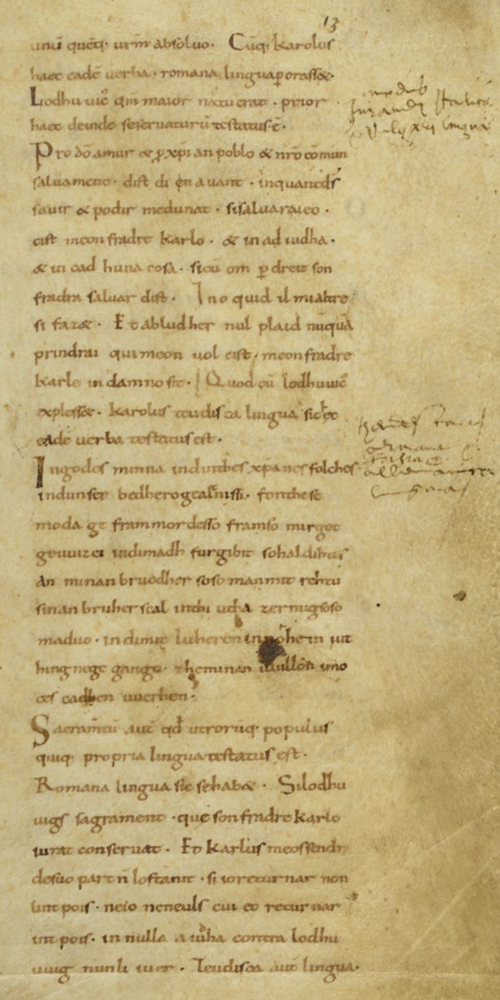
- Extract of the Oaths of Strasbourg
- Native to: Francia
- Ethnicity: Gallo-Romans
- Era: Evolved into several languages such as Old French, Old Occitan (possibly), the Gallo-Romance languages, Old Friulian, Old Romansh, and Moselle Romance.
- Language family: Indo-European: Italic; Latino-Faliscan; Latin; Romance; Italo-Western; Western Romance; Gallo-Iberian; Gallo-Romance; Old Gallo-Romance
- Early forms: Old Latin: Vulgar Latin; Proto-Romance

Language codes
- ISO 639-3: None (mis)
- Glottolog: None

Old Gallo-Romance is a Romance language spoken from around 600 to 900 AD. It evolved from the Vulgar Latin spoken by the Gallo-Romans during the time of Clovis I's successors belonging to the Merovingian dynasty.

== Characteristics ==
- Like other Romance languages, Old-Gallo Romance distinguished the masculine and feminine forms.
- The noun forms in Old Gallo-Romance were reduced from the Latin six to two, as shown in Old Occitan and Old French, with the nominative ending being -s.
- Old Gallo-Italic appears to have used V2 word order.

== Literature ==
Old Gallo-Romance literature consists of a few texts, with them including the Oaths of Strasbourg (also written in Old High Frankish). Texts that precede the Oaths of Strasbourg include the Kassel conversations and Reichenau Glossary.

== Sample text ==
The following text is Louis the German's oath in the Oaths of Strasbourg (843), which was sworn in Romance.

Old Gallo-Romance	Modern French	English
Pro Deo amur et pro christian poblo et nostro commun saluament, d'ist di en auant, in quant Deus sauir et podir me dunat, si saluarai eo cist meon fradre Karlo, et in adiudha et in cadhuna cosa, si cum om per dreit son fradra saluar dift, in o quid il mi altresi fazet. Et ab Ludher nul plaid nunquam prindrai qui meon uol cist meon fradre Karle in damno sit.	Pour l'amour de Dieu et pour le salut commun du peuple chrétien et le nôtre, à partir de ce jour, autant que Dieu m'en donne le savoir et le pouvoir, je soutiendrai mon frère Charles de mon aide et en toute chose, comme on doit justement soutenir son frère, à condition qu'il m'en fasse autant, et je ne prendrai jamais aucun arrangement avec Lothaire, qui, à ma volonté, soit au détriment de mon dit frère Charles.	For the love of God and Christiandom and our joint salvation, from this day onward, to the best of my knowledge and abilities granted by God, I shall protect my brother Charles by any means possible, as one ought to protect one's brother, insofar as he does the same for me, and I shall never willingly enter into a pact with Lothair against the interests of my brother Charles
