= Muglisano dialect =

Extinct dialect of Friulian

Muglisano
- Dialetto muglisano
- Native to: Italy
- Region: Province of Trieste
- Ethnicity: Friulians
- Extinct: 1898
- Language family: Indo-European: Italic; Latino-Faliscan; Latinic; Romance; Italo-Western; Western; Gallo-Iberian?; Gallo-Romance; Gallo-Rhaetian?; Rhaeto-Romance; Friulian; West Friulian?; Muglisano

Language codes
- ISO 639-3: –
- Glottolog: None

Muglisano is an extinct the Romance dialect spoken in Muggia until around 1870, which became extinct in favour of the current Muggia dialect of Venetian. Muglisano was a Rhaeto-Romance language, similar to Friulian, in particular to the varieties of West Friulian, and even more so to the nearby Tergestino dialect.

== History ==
The Muglisano dialect became extinct at the end of the nineteenth century: the testimonies of the last people who spoke Muglisano were collected by the abbot Jacopo Cavalli in 1889 and published in the article Ladin relics collected in Muggia d'Istria (Archivio Glottologico Italiano, vol. XXII, 1893). The last of the "Muglisani" was Niccolò Bortoloni, who was one of the sources, the most reliable, from which Cavalli drew and who died at the beginning of 1898, shortly after having also been interviewed by Matteo Bartoli.

In reality, as for Tergestino, there are some testimonies of the survival of the dialect even in the following century: in an article published in 1947, Gianni Pinguentini reports the following note "According to reliable information, in Muggia and in the rural hamlets there are still speakers of the ancient dialect. Among them, in the urban centre a certain Bertotti - el zoto barbier - seventy years old, not better identified, but easily found, being very well known among his fellow citizens" . Pinguentini also reports an expression still in use at the time in the rural locality of the Itria Valley, which presents evident Muggia traits: "là via int'al cau, tal bus del muru".

== Classification ==
Muglisano was a Rhaeto-Romance dialect similar to that spoken in Trieste (called Tergestino), therefore belonging to the same linguistic group as the Ladin, Friulian and Romansh languages, a remnant of a probable ancient Alpine linguistic continuum extending from western Switzerland to northern and coastal Istria.

There is no relationship of development between Muglisano and the subsequent Colonial Venetian (current Muggia dialect) except to a minimal extent in the lexicon.

== Studies on Muglisano ==
Graziadio Isaia Ascoli in his Saggi Ladini of 1873 identifies a south-eastern branch of Ladin, represented by Tergestino (now extinct) and by the dialect of Muggia (now on the verge of extinction) of which he had some samples from the engineer Vallon, from Muggia and member of the municipal council of Trieste. He also points out that both varieties have undergone a strong erosion by the Venetian.

In 1893 Jacopo Cavalli published first in the Archivio Glottologico Italiano and then, in a more extensive form, in 1894 in the Archeografo Triestino the essay Reliquie ladine raccolte a Muggia d'Istria. Encouraged by Ascoli, Jacopo Cavalli had gone to Muggia on two occasions (in 1889 and 1890) to collect from the mouths of the last elders who preserved the memory of the ancient Ladin dialect. From their mouths he managed to collect personal stories, proverbs, traditions and popular legends, also putting together a small vocabulary of terms used in everyday life.

In a letter sent in May 1898 to Jacopo Cavalli, Matteo Bartoli reports having met Niccolò Bortoloni (before his death at the beginning of 1898) and having collected the "last relics" of the man from Muggia. The result of this meeting was published by Bartoli only in 1926 in a short article in the Archivio Glottologico Italiano.

After some years, studies on the subject were resumed by Pier Gabriele Goidanich who in 1903 published the article Intorno alle reliquie del dialetto tergestino-muglisano, in which he attempted for the first time to trace the history of tergestino and muglisano (the term was introduced for the first time in this article to distinguish it from muggesano, of Venetian origin). Goidanich also analyses the relationships between these two varieties, Friulian and the other Ladin dialects.

In 1908 the Proceedings of the Lombard Institute of Science and Literature hosted a short paper by Carlo Salvioni: Nuovi documenti per le parlate muglisana e tergestina. The Lombard dialectologist, rummaging through the papers of Bernardino Biondelli preserved at the Biblioteca Ambrosiana in Milan, found a collection of versions of the parable of the prodigal son in different Italian dialects, collected between 1835 and 1846. Among these appears a version in Muglisano by Martino Pulgher, which most likely dates back to 1841-1842.

== Texts ==
=== Essays published in the newspaper "L'Istria" (1846) ===
In 1846 Pietro Kandler published a review of the Istrian dialects in the newspaper L'Istria and for each of them he reported as an example the version of two short texts taken from Aesop. In the issue of 16 May Kandler dealt with the dialect of Muggia. The two texts were taken up again by Jacopo Cavalli in Reliquie ladine raccolte a Muggia d'Istria.

I.

Doi omin zigua per la so strada, un de lour gà vedú una manara, e dis guara, ce che mi gai chiattà. Quell'altro ghe dis, no ti doves favellar gai chiattà, ma gavom chiattà. Pouch tiemp dopo arriva quel, che gavegua perdú la manara, e avendola veduda in man de lui el ga principii a dierghe ladro. Nous sunon muort el dis subit: ma el so cumpagn ghe rispuont: No ti doveres dier sunon muort, ma son muort, perché allora za puoc, che ti gavegui chiattada la manara, ti disegui la gai chiattada, e no l'avom chiattada.

II.

Giera invier, e glas fuort. La furmia, che gavegua ingrumè nell'istà, una buogna provision, ella giera cuntienta nella sua chiasa. La zialla giera zuda sottatiera; e la crepagua de fam, e de fret. La ga priegià innallora la furmia; che la ghe dares un puoc de magnar; tant, che no la crepa de fam. La furmia ghe dis, e dola ti se zuda nel cour dell'istà? perché no ti ga fat in kuel tiemp provision? In istà, dis la zialla mi chiantegua; e fegua goder quei che passegua. E la furmia va disienti: se d' istà, ti chiantegui, ades, che se invier, e ti bala.

=== Novella I.9 by Boccaccio (1875) ===
Within the collection of dialect versions of the ninth tale of the first day of the Decamerone, published by Giovanni Papanti in 1875 and entitled I parlari italiani in Certaldo alla festa del V centenario di Messer Giovanni Boccacci, there also appears a version in Muggia dialect. The translation is by Giacomo Zaccaria, mayor of Muggia.

Dich doncia, che al tiemp del prin Re de Sipro, dop el acquist che à fat della Tierra Santa el Gotifred de Buglion, xe vegnu che una lustrissima femena de Guascogna xe zuda in tarrotorj al Sant Sepulcro, de dola turnada a Sipro, la xe stada da omin selerat svilanamentre ultragiada: de se ela senza nigun confuort affisendose, ga pensà de zier a lamentarse viers el Suvran; ma i ga dit che la pierdì la fadìa, persè el stegua poco ben, e che no quei de nussaltri, ma gnanca i so proprj tuort al sa pajar: in tant che se qualchedun ga qualche crusi, se sfugheva col farghe despet. Intiendù questa roba la femena, desperada de vendiarse, per cunsulasse la pensà der mursiar ancia ela la miseria del Suvran; e la ze zuda pluranti viers de lu, e la ghe diss: "Lustrissimo, no son vignuda viers de vu persè me vendie dell'ultraj che me xe sta fat, ma in pajamient di quest ultraj ve priegh se me insegnei cumodo che vu suporte quele baronade che hai intiendu che i v'à fat, persè imparandi possa suportar ancia le mie; e, se pudares, Dio sà se ve dares ancia i mi affan, vu che suporté i ultraj cun pocia fadìa." El Suvran che fin in quel mumiente gera un smorza fadìa, cume se el se fusse desmissidà, prinsipianti dell'ultraj che ghe xe sta fat a sta femena, el ga dà suddisfazion, e de quel di inaint el ciastigueva cun tutt rigour i ultraj chi ghe feva all'onour della su' corona.
