= Tergestino dialect =

Extinct dialect of Friulian

Tergestino
- Dialetto tergestino
- Native to: Italy
- Region: Province of Trieste
- Ethnicity: Friulians
- Extinct: 1889
- Language family: Indo-European: Italic; Latino-Faliscan; Latinic; Romance; Italo-Western; Western; Gallo-Iberian?; Gallo-Romance; Gallo-Rhaetian?; Rhaeto-Romance; Friulian; West Friulian?; Tergestino

Language codes
- ISO 639-3: –
- Glottolog: None

Tergestino is an the Romance dialect spoken in Trieste until the nineteenth century, when it became extinct in favour of the Triestine dialect of Venetian. was a Rhaeto-Romance language, similar to Friulian, in particular to the varieties of West Friulian, and even more so to the nearby Muglisano dialect. Tergestino, reduced to the language of a closed aristocracy, became extinct before Muglisan, which did not have this rigid class specialisation.

== History ==
Tergentino was spoken in Trieste by the majority of the population until the end of the eighteenth century. From that period onwards, a rapid process of linguistic substitution began which led to the disappearance of Tergentino and the prevalence of Colonial Venetian, the Triestine dialect. The substitution occurred when Trieste, Habsburg since 1382, became an important commercial port (starting in 1719) and its population rapidly increased from around 6,000 inhabitants to more than 200,000. This demographic increase, due to massive immigration from areas with a different language, overturned the linguistic fabric of Trieste and led to the disappearance of Tergentino. It survived until the first half of the nineteenth century as the language of the oldest aristocratic families of the city (called lis tredis ciasadis).

Moving along the lines of a tradition inaugurated by Pier Gabriele Goidanich and taken up more recently by Mario Doria, two phases can be identified in the history of Tergestino: an older one that goes from 1300, the period to which the first attestations date back, up to the first half of the eighteenth century, and a "modern" one that ends in the first half of the nineteenth century with its extinction.

=== Ancient phase ===
Of the first phase we have only indirect and sporadic evidence consisting of passages found in documents from the Trieste archives, "relics" collected by Jacopo Cavalli and Graziadio Isaia Ascoli in some writings from the late 19th century and more recently by Pavle Merkù. These are short phrases, anthroponyms and toponyms within documents written in Latin or, in some cases, in a Venetian-style vernacular.

To these documentary fragments are added indirect testimonies such as the one dating back to 1542 and contained in a letter sent from Nice by the Capodistrian Gerolamo Muzio to Pier Paolo Vergerio, bishop of Capodistria: "This city has its own language, which is neither Italian, nor French, nor Provençal as Muggia and Trieste have in our countries" , or again the note added by Giacomo Filippo Tommasini, bishop of Cittanova who died in 1654, in his commentaries: "The language of these inhabitants (of Trieste) is corrupted Forlan; and there are many who use the Slavic language, and German but they are not natural here".

=== Modern phase ===
The second phase begins with the period in which the city, following the granting of the prerogative of free port by the Austrian Emperor Charles VI in 1719, experienced a period of rapid demographic expansion and a parallel restriction of the diffusion of the Tergestino dialect, which ended up being confined to a small group of people belonging mostly to the old Trieste patriciate who jealously guarded it.

We could therefore somehow speak of a phase characterised initially by the resistance of the original dialect (until the end of the 18th century) and then by a rapid decline (first decades of the 19th century).

The only written texts available to us belong to this period:

- The Sonet del ver Triestin, dating back to 1796.
- The Racont, a composition in verse also dating back to 1796, which describes the same event narrated by the Sonet.
- The Dialoghi piacevoli in dialetto vernacolo triestino, composed by Giuseppe Mainati in 1828.
- The Tergestino version of the parable of the Prodigal Son (Parabula del fi prodigh) by Mainati himself dates back to a period between 1835 and the author's death in 1842.

To these texts we can add several indirect testimonies, which cover a rather long period and, starting from the mid-18th century, arrive up to the threshold of the scientific systematization inaugurated by Ascoli.

In the report attached to the Consul Hamilton's report to Maria Theresa of 25 July 1761, Tomaso Ustia states that in Trieste "there are inhabitants of three different languages, namely Italian, Triestino and Slavic: whoever does not know that the particular Triestino language, used particularly by the Plebs, gives any good Italian in many words necessary to be understood will not be understood, and that the majority of the Plebs themselves do not know how to express themselves in Italian..." , thus confirming the eighteenth-century vitality of the Triestino language.

In a note to a sonnet written in Italian by Pietro Bachiocco in 1797, the phrase appears: "The vernacular dialect of Trieste and Muggia are very similar".

Antonio Cratey in the “Perigrafia di Trieste”, published in 1808, writes: “it will be said that Trieste borders on Friuli and was a Venetian state, and that therefore its dialect, although used by few nowadays, is a mix of Friulian and Venetian.” . The author also records in the toponymy of the city forms from Trieste such as Baudariu, Chiadino, Chiarbola, Ciauchiara, Pondares.

In the note on Italian dialects added by Francesco Cherubini to the translation of the Prospetto nominativo di tutte le lingue note e dei loro dialetti by Federico Adelung, published in 1824, we read “Even in the Trieste area (Illyria) an Italian dialect is spoken that resembles Friulian”.

Again in 1824, Girolamo Agapito in his "Complete and extensive description of the most faithful city and free port of Trieste" describes the dialect of Trieste as "an Italian dialect which originally had many of its own properties and was somewhat distant from the Venetian dialect to which, however, it gradually came closer, so that, at present, it can be said that it is the same Venetian vernacular".

On 22 June 1845, the magazine Il Caleidoscopio published a sonnet dating back to 1796 (Il sonet del ver Triestin which was mentioned above). The editor of the newspaper, Adalberto Thiergen (hidden under the pseudonym of Tito Delaberrenga), noted: "The ancient Triestine dialect, now almost lost in written texts, and adulterated in common speech, was composed largely of Venetian, with some phrases or endings from neighbouring Friuli and Istria".

Pietro Kandler's position deserves particular attention, both for the authoritativeness of the character and for the evolution of his opinion on the Friulian dialect over time. Kandler in fact starts from a very sceptical vision: in the March 28, 1846 issue of the newspaper L'Istria we read “The belief took hold that the dialect already spoken in Trieste was Friulian, and in support of this was cited the custom of some noble family, some occasional writings, the not new opinion that Trieste physically belonged to Friuli. The use of the Friulian dialect was never by the common people, nor by the generality, but by single individuals”. A somewhat more nuanced position is found in Istria, in the issue of 16 May of the same year: dealing with the dialect of Muggia, Kandler writes “The dialect that was spoken there and that is still spoken there by many, differed in some ways from Venetian; some say that the dialect of Muggia is the same one that was spoken in Trieste in times past; an opinion that needs better verification than that which can be given today in the language spoken by the people”. This point of view will change significantly in the following decades. In a handwritten note on his personal copy of the first edition of the "History of the Council of Patricians of Trieste" and therefore datable between 1858 (date of publication) and 1872 (date of Kandler's death), transcribing a satirical poem dating back to 1689, Kandler notes "In this poem we have a sample of the Ferrarese dialect, which Quinto spoke, and of the vulgar Triestine dialect put into the mouth of a patrician who put the fields, whose cultivation he directed, before public cares." , and a few lines below "To sing a patrician because he spoke plebeian jargon, points out what was known to us through other means, that is, that two dialects were spoken in Trieste: the plebeian which must be common in Muggia according to what we have heard; and the noble, which was Venetian raised to the dignity of a spoken language, but not of a written language".

In 1859 Jacopo Pirona, in his Attenenze della lingua friulana date per chiosa ad una iscrizione del MCIII wrote: It will seem strange to the majority of the inhabitants of Trieste to find themselves included under an ethnographic aspect in the region of Friuli. It is however certain that as far as we can remember in the original Triestine families Friulian was spoken; and whoever does not believe this should see the book by the Triestine Mainati "Dialogues pleasant in dialetto vernacolo triestino", Trieste 1828. The original inhabitants however are now few and the non-original inhabitants, using the common Italian language, do not even realise that they are in Friulian land.

In 1867 Michele Leicht, in the "Terza centuria di canti popolari friulani", published the entire fourth dialogue of Mainati.

=== The last Tergestini ===
In 1893 Abbot Jacopo Cavalli published the results of a survey conducted among the elderly inhabitants of old Trieste in the previous three years, from which a picture emerged that confirmed what Mainati had stated in his introduction to the Dialogues. The people interviewed recalled that in the first decades of the 19th century, Tergentino was still spoken in some families belonging to the environment of lis tredis ciasadis and from their declarations, supported by authoritative witnesses such as Attilio Hortis, memories of the ancient dialect and some phrases heard in youth emerge.

It also emerges that, surprisingly, Tergestino still survived in the second half of the 19th century, at a time when even Ascoli thought it was extinct: the last speaker, Giuseppe de Jurco, who had used it fluently in his family until 1833 and had passed it on to his children, died in 1889. Also emblematic is the case of Stefano de Conti (known as Sciefin), mayor of Trieste from 1861 to 1863 and who died in 1872, who spoke it regularly with his brother Giusto (who died in 1876) and with the elderly Triestini. According to one of the testimonies collected by Cavalli, he had used it with his Friulian interlocutors during a visit to Cormons as mayor of Trieste, causing amazement among those present.

To these testimonies we can add a letter sent from Rome on 18 December 1893 to Jacopo Cavalli by the archaeologist Dante Vaglieri (1865-1913), in which we read "I can also say that in our families, among all the relatives, the Mainati was owned and it never occurred to anyone to call him - for his work on the dialect - a forger. We also owned a copy, which later disappeared, and it was one of my readings in my childhood".

In reality, the last traces of Tergestino could be even more recent: in 2008 the linguist Pavle Merkù reported having discovered that a single peasant family on the outskirts of the city continued to use the ancient dialect until the eve of the World War I. Furthermore, according to Merkù, at the end of the nineteenth century there would have been, in addition to those registered by Cavalli, other people in the city who continued to use the ancient dialect, including Baroness Economo.

== Studies on Tergestino ==
The term "Tergestino" to indicate the dialect spoken in Trieste was introduced by Graziadio Isaia Ascoli in his Saggi Ladini of 1873. Ascoli identifies a south-eastern branch of Ladin, represented precisely by Tergestino and the adjacent dialect of Muggia and indicates the dialogues of Mainati as the only source for tergestino. He also points out that both varieties have undergone a strong erosion by Venetian. Ascoli's statement arouses a great deal of incredulity and a lively controversy in the local context (see for example the writings of Paolo Tedeschi on the Province of Istria). Even in the community of glottologists several doubts arise, linked above all to the presence of a single source and to the fact that apparently no one in Trieste retained memory of the ancient dialect. In the following years, however, a series of documentary discoveries gradually led the most authoritative scholars to accept Ascoli's thesis.

In a letter dated 6 October 1877, the illustrious German Romanist Hugo Schuchardt sent to Ascoli a new text brought to his attention by Vincenzo Joppi, explicitly declaring “Those doubts have disappeared, having, following Joppi's indication, read and copied another essay by the ancient Triestine”. The short composition, known as Sonet del ver triestin, describes the consecration of the bishop Ignazio Gaetano de Buset of Fraistemberg which took place in Trieste on 23 October 1796.

Also in 1877, Jacopo Cavalli's La storia di Trieste raccontata ai giovanetti was published, with a section dedicated to linguistic aspects in which some extracts from the Municipal Archives are reported. The excerpts range from the 14th to the 16th century and show various forms attributable to a Ladin-type dialect. Cavalli had previously shown himself to be rather sceptical about Mainati's text to the point of writing, in the Province of Istria on 16 April 1873, “In any case, and leaving aside, for now, whether in 1828 the dialect which is in Mainati was actually spoken in Trieste, which, in truth, we have strong reasons to doubt, and to which we will return at some point;” and also in the Storia di Trieste he seems to somehow place the decline of the Triestine dialect at the end of the 16th century: “Venice, which brought and spread the Italian language on the eastern coasts of the Mediterranean, gradually modified and transformed the Triestine vernacular; and already from the documents of the second half of the 16th century it can be seen how from then on it had yielded not a little to that Venetian dialect, which supplanted it, and which is in current use.”

In 1878, Ascoli published in the Archivio Glottologico, under the title of Cimelj dell'Antico Parlare Tergestino, a collection of documentary excerpts from the Trieste archives, edited by the abbot Jacopo Cavalli, which takes up in a broader form that contained in the Storia di Trieste. In these documents appear characteristic forms of Tergestino, in accordance with the language of the Dialogues, as well as anthroponyms and toponyms of evident Ladin origin. The texts cover a period from 1325 to 1550 and the 1796 sonnet, the subject of the letter from Schuchardt to Ascoli cited above, was also published. The results of this study led to the acceptance of Ascoli's theses by two other authoritative Austrian glottologists: HJ Bidermann (1877) and Carl von Czoernig (1885).

The controversy gained strength again in 1888 with Oddone Zenatti who, in a study on “municipal life and the dialect of Trieste in 1426”, contested the Cimelj by maintaining that the Ladin traces identified in Cavalli's documents are to be traced back to forms common between Friulian and the ancient dialect of Venice and not to the presence of a Friulian dialect in Trieste. Zenatti, relying on the fact that Mainati had committed plagiarism in his historical publications (taken from the work of Father Ireneo della Croce), also declared that the Dialogues were a mystification and the Tergestino dialect was an artfully constructed dialect. “The Friulian that he often heard spoken on the street, as it is very often heard nowadays from the mouths of the labourers who come in great numbers from Friuli to Trieste in search of work, provided him with three quarters of his new dialect; the other quarter he put in himself...”

Ascoli reacts rather forcefully by first sending a letter to Zenatti in which he sets out his reasons and then with an article that will be published in the same year in the Archivio Glottologico Italiano, in which he dismantles both the claims regarding the scarce reliability of the documentary evidence collected by Cavalli, and the hypothesis of a mystification carried out by Mainati. On this last point Ascoli demonstrates that the dialogues are too complex a text to be a forgery and that the dialect that appears in them is coherent with the content of Cavalli's evidence, especially in the elements that distinguish it from other varieties of Friulian. Ascoli's intervention, although authoritative, does not however close the controversy (see for example the Province of Istria of 16 September 1889) which continues in the following years: it is no coincidence that in the small volume Avanzi dell'antico dialetto triestino cioè i sette dialoghi piacevoli pubblicati dal Mainati: un sonetto ed altri cimeli linguistici con prefazione published in 1891 by Emilio Schatzmayr, there also appears, next to a summary of Ascoli's article, a writing by Giovanni Loser in which Zenatti's positions are taken up again.

In 1893 Jacopo Cavalli, in the appendix to the Reliquie ladine raccolte a Muggia d'Istria, published a new series of documentary excerpts, obtained from Attilio Hortis, which cover the period between 1550 (the period to which the 1878 relics arrived) and 1796 (the year of publication of the sonnet). Cavalli also had the good fortune of being able to collect some precious testimonies from living people who still had memory of Tergestino and who provided, in addition to the confirmation of the fact that Tergestino was still spoken by some families in the first half of the 19th century, further lexical elements which would prove invaluable for subsequent linguistic studies. Paolo Tedeschi himself, in the Province of Istria of 16 July 1893, recognises the authority of the testimony of Gerolamo Muzio reported by Cavalli, thus closing in some way the dispute that had flared up in the previous years (Tedeschi will return in part to the question, in the Province of Istria of 16 January 1894, expressing some other doubts).

The studies of the following years, which by now took the veracity of Mainati's Dialogues and the other finds as established, moved in two directions: the search for further documentary evidence, direct or indirect, and a systematization of the known elements.

Giuseppe Vidossi moves in the first line of thought and in his studies on the Triestine dialect of 1899 he briefly summarises the testimonies cited by Cavalli and adds some new elements including a citation from 1824 by the dialectologist Francesco Cherubini who, in his translation of the Prospetto nominativo di tutte le lingue note e dei loro dialetti by Friedrich von Adelung, adds a note on Italian dialects in which he writes (page 114) “Even in the Triestine area (Illyria) a dialect is spoken which resembles Friulian”.

The second trend includes the work of Pier Gabriele Goidanich who in 1903 published Intorno alle reliquie del dialetto tergestino-muglisano, in which he attempted for the first time to trace the history of the tergestino and the adjacent Muglisan dialect (the term is introduced for the first time in this article to distinguish it from Muggese, of Venetian origin), distinguishing between an ancient phase, witnessed by the fragments collected in the archives, and a modern one outlined by the Dialoghi di Mainati and the sonnet of 1796. Goidanich also analyses the relationships between these two varieties, Friulian and the other Ladin dialects.

In 1908 the Proceedings of the Lombard Institute of Science and Literature hosted a short piece by Carlo Salvioni: Nuovi documenti per le parlate muglisana e tergestina. The Lombard dialectologist, rummaging through the papers of Bernardino Biondelli preserved at the Biblioteca Ambrosiana in Milan, found a collection of versions of the parable of the prodigal son in different Italian dialects, collected between 1835 and 1846. Among these appears a version in Tergestino (Parabula del fi prodigh) by Mainati which most likely dates back to 1841-1842 (the year of Mainati's death) and is therefore later than the Dialogues. The text is accompanied by a short note on pronunciation which will prove invaluable for the reconstruction of the phonetics.

A few years later, in 1911, Giuseppe Vidossi published a new document that he had found two years earlier: it is a composition in verse that tells the same event narrated by the Sonet del ver triestin and therefore dates back to 1796. This text too, the last to have been found so far, coherently reports the peculiar elements of the Tergestino dialect that can be detected in the dialogues and presents all the typical characteristics of the Ladin dialects.

After a rather long period of pause, studies on the Tergestino dialect regained strength in the post-war period with a work by Baccio Ziliotto published in 1944 in Ce Fastu. In this article Ziliotto hypothesizes that even the two minor unattributed texts (Sonet and Racont) are in reality the work of Giuseppe Mainati. For the Sonet Ziliotto starts from the author's initials (GMB), which are interpreted as Giuseppe Mainati Brezaucich (Mainati's mother's surname), while the attribution of the Racont is based on the fact that both texts describe the same event. The article also publishes a testimony dating back to 1797: in a note to a sonnet written in Italian by Pietro Bachiocco the phrase appears: "The vernacular dialect of Trieste and Muglense are very similar".

The following year saw the publication of the important text of linguistic geography Alle porte orientali d'Italia by Matteo Bartoli and Giuseppe Vidossi, which analyses in depth the dialectal and linguistic situation of Venezia Giulia, Friuli and Istria and hypothesizes, in an ancient phase, the extension of the Friulian area up to Capodistria.

The 1960s saw a further growth in interest in this dialect, which attracted the attention of three high-ranking linguists such as Giovan Battista Pellegrini, Mario Doria and Carlo Battisti. Pellegrini turned his attention mainly to the analysis of some peculiar morphological and grammatical traits (for example the enclitic –to in the second person of verbs), while Mario Doria dedicated himself to a systematization of the knowledge of the toponymy of the Trieste area, highlighting in an in-depth essay published in 1960 in Ce fastu how approximately 60% of the toponyms can be traced back to the Tergestino dialect.

Carlo Battisti's position is original, known for having supported the independent evolution of the Ladin languages in opposition to Ascoli's unitary theory, who in some writings published between 1963 and 1964 states that Tergestino and Muglisano, despite their similarities with Friulian, constitute an autochthonous development of an "early medieval Latin" and should eventually be connected with the pre-Venetian Romance forms spread along the Istrian coast. The main reason given by Battisti is the early interruption of the linguistic continuity between Friuli and the Trieste area, due to the formation of a Venetian-Slovenian wedge on the Karst. Mario Doria will intervene on the subject in 1969 with a study on the toponymy of the Karst, in which he demonstrates that in reality Tergestino and Muglisano were welded with the Friulian of the Monfalcone area through the westernmost strip of the Karst plateau.

Since the 1970s, studies on Tergestino have been profoundly influenced by the work of Mario Doria and his colleagues and students, who moved on two fronts: a systematization of the knowledge already acquired and the search for new testimonies, both direct and indirect. In the first line, we can point out the publication in 1972 of the critical edition of Mainati's Dialoghi by Doria himself and of the minor texts by Diomiro Zudini, up to the publication of a lexical repertoire of modern Tergestino, published in two instalments in the Archeografo Triestino between 1993 and 1994, in which all the lemmas deducible from the known sources converge. On the second front we can include several articles on toponymy, on the Friulian lexical elements that emerge in the Trieste dialect and some relics surprisingly collected at the beginning of the 20th century.

== Phonetics and phonology ==
The basic vocalism of Tergestino is solidly Friulian and features the typical diphthongization of the short Latin -e- and -o- in tonic position and closed syllable: we will therefore have the transformations e>ie (biel) and o>ue (gruessa, uess). When examining the successive evolutions of these diphthongs, one can note the lack of the raising of –e- before –m- or –n- followed by a consonant (tiemp, Friulian timp; puent, Friulian puint), while the lowering of –e- before r is regularly present (tiara, muarta). In the oldest forms, the diphthongization –ei- also appears with a certain frequency (bein, teila), which recalls Istrian forms. Finally, it is worth noting that the diphthong -au- is maintained even in words where Friulian has simplified it to –o- (chiausa= cosa (thing), Friulian cjosse; auregla= orecchia (ear), Friulian orele).

As regards the treatment of consonants, one can note the regular presence of one of the main characteristics of the Rhaeto-Romance languages, and of Friulian in particular: the palatalization of velars (c e g) before a (it should be kept in mind that, as Mario Doria points out in his critical edition of the Dialogues, in the form –chia- the c should be pronounced as palatal [tʃa], an interpretation also supported by Cavalli's phonetic transcription in the Reliquie). The palatal treatment of GA is in reality poorly attested and seems to highlight a further evolution of the palatal consonant as an approximant [dʒ]>[j] (jata= gatta (cat), present both in the Dialogues and in the testimonies collected by Cavalli).

The conservation of the connections bl, cl, gl, fl, pl etc. is also regularly present. It is worth noting the conservation of the connection gl derived from the Latin –CULUM even in the stressed syllable, where Friulian simplifies to l (pedoglo= pidocchio (louse), Friulian pedoli; auregla= orecchia (ear), Friulian orele; oglo= occhio (eye), Friulian voli) while there is identity in the dropping of vowels other than a in final position, in particular after occlusive consonants or after st (Zust, Triest). Peculiar are instead the labialization of the nasal in final position (-n > -m) and the lack of opposition between [v] and [w], also witnessed by a note by Mainati on the parable of the prodigal son, which leads to always having the semi-vowel (aueua, auliu). Also characteristic is the velarization into [w] of the lateral approximant [l] after -a- and -o- (soud= soldo (soldier), soudà= soldato, auzà= alzare (to raise), autar= altare (altar), Chiauchiara= Calcara (limestone kiln)).

== Texts ==
=== Pleasant dialogues in the Trieste dialect (G. Mainati, 1828) ===
First publication: G. Mainati Dialoghi piacevoli in dialetto vernacolo triestino..., Edizioni G. Marenigh Trieste 1828. Republished in 1891, with several errors, by Emilio Schatzmayr ("Remains of the ancient dialect of Trieste: that is, the seven pleasant dialogues published by Mainati, a sonnet, and other linguistic relics" – Trieste, 1891) and in a critical edition by Mario Doria in 1972.

Author's note: All z's are pronounced harsh, as if they were double, except those marked italic Z z, which are pronounced soft.

Sior Bastiam, and sou fì Jaco, who fauèlem im plaza grànda, and then uam to Sam Zùst.

Jaco – Missior pàre, perzè la xe kì stà colòna ?
Bastiam – L'ham mietùda kì in chel am che xe uignù a Triest l'Imperator Carlo sesto
Jaco – Dola la jera prima?
Bastiam – El Maistrato l'hau fata fà apòsta

[...]

Jaco – Ze pieris grandis! Uedèi! Uèdei! Ham mietùdis de lis colònis! Ma ze bisogna jera de fichià intel mur stis colònis? Perzè pò ham frabicà sto chiampanìl a la roviàrsa? Uoi di còlis pièris grandis de sora, e lis plui pìzulis de sota?
Bastiam - Quand che ti auaràsto imparà plui bem l'architetura, cognossaràsto mièi, e no fauelaràsto cussì.
Jaco - Aimò impar malapèna i set ordim architetònich.
Bastiam - Zà che imparisto i set òrdim de architetura, dìme, da ze òrdim xem stis colònis?
Jaco - Del òrdim Corintìo scanelà.
Bastiam - Come cognossisto che lis sèis del òrdim Corintìo?
Jaco - Dai chiapitièi, che ham lis fòiis come chela planta che se clama acànto.
Bastiam – Te stìm. Asto da sauè, che chilò antigamiènt no jera chiampanìl; ma jera um tiemplo che i Romàm dedicà a la Dia Uènere, se cred. No uèdisto che sora lis colònis xem i arch?

[...]

Jaco - Ze xe scrit intòl pedestàl?
Bastiam - Lèj, e po sauàrasto ze che xe scrit.
Jaco - Numine... me par che sìis paràulis latìnis, mi no capèss.
Bastiam - Ua là, ua là, zuss. Lejerài mi. Nùmine sub nostro felìces vìvite cives; arbìtri vestri quidquid habètis, erit.
Jaco - Ze uol dì?
Bastiam - Aimò te disarài per taliàm. Sòta i nuèstri auspìzj podarèi uìue contiènti Tristini, chel che ghauèi sarà uèstro, de podè fà chel che uolèi.
Jaco - Ze uol dì, sota i nuèstri auspizj?
Bastiam - Uol dì, sota la nuèstra proteziòm.

=== Parable of the Prodigal Son (G. Mainati, 1841) ===
First published by Carlo Salvioni. The dating is by Salvioni (Mainati died in 1842).

Author's note: Observations on the pronunciation of the ancient Triestine dialect. The c before a vowel replaces a double z. For example: Schiauèca, Scomènca, Percè is pronounced Schiauèzza, Scomènzza, Perzzè etc. The v. consonant is never pronounced softly, but the u. vowel is always pronounced softly. In no case are letters doubled except for the ss.

11. Un òmis l'hau bù dò fiòi.
12. El fi plùi zòuem um di el ghàu dit a sòu pare: missiòr pare uòi che me dèi la mèja part de l'eredità che me uèm: e sòu pare hàu sparti la roba in dòi, e 'l ghàu dà la sòua part che ghe tocheua.
13. Chel fi plui zouem, dopò poch dì l'hau ingrumàda la sòua roba, e 'l xe zù uia intùm pajès lontàm, lontàm, e inlò l'hau magna dut el sòu colis femenis chiatiuis.
14. Dopò che l'hau consumà dut el soù (sic) malamént xe uignùda in chel pajès una granda caristia, e lu che 'l jera deuentà um pouer stracom,
15. el xe zù da um siòr, aciò che'l ghe dàis nàlch de fa per bruscàsse um toch de pam; chel siòr l'hau bù compassiom, e l'hau manda intòla sòua mandria a pascola i temporai.
16. La fàm che lo tormenteua ghe fièua brama de impignisse la panza de chèlis jàndis che magnèuem i temporai, e nissùm ghe ne deva.
17. In chela uolta l'hau scomencà pensaghe su; e l'hau [-u aggiunto] dìt: quanti famèi in chiàsa de mio pare che gham del pam plui del sòu bisògn, e mi chilò me muar de fam!
18. Mi uèi zì uia de ca, e zierài da mei pare, e ghe dirai: Missiòr pare hai pecà contra el Siòr Idio, e contra de uòi:
19. mi no soi plui degn d'èsse uestro fi, uè prèi de mèteme a serui coi uestri famèi.
20. In chèla uòlta el se ghau leva su, e 'l xe zù adritura da sou pare: quand che l'jera aimò lontàm, e che sou pare l'hau uidù, el se ghau mossù a misericordia e prest el ghe xe zù incontra, e 'l se gha butà sul col, e l'hàu bussa.
21. In chela uòlta ghàu dìt chel sou fi: missiòr pare hai pecà contra el Sior Idio, e contra de uòi, mi no soi plui degn che me chiamèi uestro fi:
22. e sòu pare ghàu dit ai soui famèi: portei ca prest el plui biel abit, uestilo, e meteghe in tola soua mam l'ànul, e lis schiàrpis in tòi sòui pei,
23. menei cà um uedèl grass, e copèlo che lo magnarèm, e farèm alegrìa,
24. percè chest mei fi el jera muart e l'hau torna uiu, el se jera piardù, e l'hauèm trouà; e dopò i xem zudi a magnà alegramènt.
25. El fi plui uèch el jera intòla mandria. Quand' che l'hau tornà, e che jera rent la chiasa l'hau sentì che soneuem, e chianteuem alegramènt,
26. l'hau chiamà um famei e ‘l ghau domandà percè che feuem tanta alegrìa;
27. e chel famei ghau dit: xe uignù [forma corretta da altra] uestro fradel, e uestro siòr pare l'hau fat copà um uedel grass, perce che l'hau torna sam e salf.
28. Sientènd sta roba l'hau chiapà una fùfa malignaza, e noi uoleva zi drent in chiasa. Quand che sou pare l'hau sientù cussi el xe zù fora da chest fi plui uièch e lo prejèua ch'el uigniss drent.
29. In chela volta el ghau respòst a sou pare: uarèi missiòr pare, xem tant agn che uè fac el famèi, e uè ghai sèmpre ubidì, e mai che me ues dà um caurèt per fa un alegria coi mei amici;
30. e aimò che xe tornà chel schiauèca col de uestro fi, che l'hau magna dut el sòu còlis uàchis, ghauèi fat copà um uedèl grass;
31. ma sòu pare ghàu respost: caro fi ti som sempre com mi, e dut chel che xe mèi xe anchia tòu,
32. scugnéva donca fa una granda fiesta, e stà alegrament, percè chest tou fradel ch'el jera muart l'hau torna uiu; e'l jèra piardù, e 'l se trouest.

=== Salviati's Istrian text ===
To conclude the overview of the Tergestino texts, a brief excursus on the Istrian version of tale 1.9 of the Decameron may be useful, collected in 1584 by Lionardo Salviati together with eleven other versions in the main dialects of the Italian peninsula and taken up by Giovanni Papanti in a much larger collection published in 1875. In a note published in 1878 in the Archivio Glottologico Italiano, Ascoli highlighted the presence in the text of a certain number of evident Friulianisms, some of which can be traced back to the peculiar characteristics of the Tergestino: for example the levelling in –is of the three singular persons of the present subjunctive, the form in toi or the use of the verb zì (andare, to go). Ascoli therefore placed the area of origin of the tale in the north of Istria, leaving us to understand that it could be a text connected to the Tergestino. However, the rather watered-down Friulian characters and the Istrian influence, much more marked than one would expect in such an ancient text, have led most scholars to attribute it to ancient Capodistrian, seen as a transitional dialect between the Friulian and Istrian areas.

Digo donca che in toi tempi del primo Re de Zipro despò il uadagno fatto della Terra Santa de Gottofreddo de i Baioi, fo intravegnù ch'una zentildonna de Vascogna fo zuda in peligrazo al Sepurchio. Do la tornando in drio, zonta in Ziprio, de no se quanti scelerai homi fo con gran vellania suergognada. Donde che ella senza consolation niguna lementandose s'habù impensà de uoler cigar dananzi lo Re. Ma a ghe fo ditto de un, che indarno le se averes fatigà; Perché lui rieua d'una uita tanto minchiona, e de poco, che no solamente l'inzurie de' altri con zustizia fadeva uendetta, ma pur assè che ghe riera fatte a lui con gran uergogna padiva. Donde che, quando calcun haueua calche dolor, lui, con farghe ualguna inzuria o despresio, se sborava l'animo so! E cusì hauendo bù inteso la femena, desperada de far la so uendetta, per calche consolation del so trauaio, s'habù impensà de voler soiar le sturdità de sto Re. E zuda pianzendo alla so presenzia g'abù ditto: "Signor mio, i' no uegno za de ti, azzocchè ti vendicheis l'inzuria che me se stada fatta, ma in gambio de quella te priego che ti m'insegnis co che ti sopportis quelle, che me uin ditto che te se fatte, azzocchè imparando de ti, possis anche mi con patientia soffrir la mia: che Dio il sa, se lo potes far uolentiera i te la donares, despò che ti ses così bon minchion." El Re, inchinta quella bota, essendo sta longo e priego, co a se fos desmesedà del sonno, scomenzando della inzuria fatta a sta femena, che amaramente la bù uendicada, crudiel persecutor fò deuentà de tutti che incontra l'honor della so Corona cosa neguna fades de za ananzi.

== Relics ==
The term relics is used by glottologists to indicate the lexical fragments of an extinct language, collected from the mouths of the last people who retain a direct or indirect memory of it. As often happens with extinct languages, also in the case of Tergestino these fragments constitute a precious tool for the reconstruction of the lexicon and pronunciation.

=== Jacopo Cavalli ===
We report in synthetic form the Tergestino terms collected by Jacopo Cavalli between 1889 and 1893 from the mouths of the last people who remembered the ancient dialect and published in 1894. The sentence fragments are collected under the name of the witnesses who reported them to Cavalli (the date of the testimony is in brackets).

==== Testimony of Carolina Camuzzini, widow of De Jenner (15 October 1889) ====
Bógna dì, scogni fà, ze fastu, ze distu, ze astu fat, ze astu dit, parzè no venstu, zivi e livi (andavo), i nuéstri frutz, i nóstri màmui, dolà l'é zùda la fruta, ze biéla fantata e ze biéla màmula, lis màmulis, va a clamarlo, no stà plorar, çe vàis, ancia, doncia, Trièst, la fèmina, el to om, lis feminis, la ciasa, lis tredis ciasadis, la ciassa (mestolo), la ciaudiera (caldaia), la zita (pentola), vieclo/viecla, va a siarà la puarta, dolà l'è la claf, l'asto ciatada, astu cialat el fuc, astu veglat, i sclaf, clama me sur, i miéi fradi, el ciaf, ciala se ‘l pam ze cuet.

==== Testimony of Carlo de Porenta (28 October 1889) ====
Ze fastu, ze distu, ze bièla fantata, doncia, ancia, parzè.

==== Testimony of Anna Minas (September 29, 1890) ====
Scogna, bogna, candrega, plevan, furnate (tempo coperto senza pioggia, cloudy weather without rain).

==== Testimony of Maria Lorenzi (24 August 1892) ====
Ze a fat la Zezilia, un mamul o una mamula?

==== Testimony of Matilde de Calò and Maria de Camin (January 21, 1893) ====
Lait a ciasa, che l'mamul plora (Andate a casa che il bimbo piange, Go home, the baby is crying); Ciala Pèpiz, ze che a fat la jata (Guarda Giuseppe, cosa ha fatto la gatta, Look, Giuseppe, what the cat did).

==== Testimony of Nicolò Bortoloni ====
Cacabus (terra appiccicosa, sticky earth), planèr (canestro, basket), zipòn (giacca femminile, female jacket), va inlò (va là, go there), ven chilò (vieni qui, come here).

=== Graziadio Isaiah Ascoli ===
In two letters, Ascoli reports some Tergestino terms he had firsthand experience with, having heard them from an elderly relative and acquaintances. We reproduce significant excerpts from the two letters, in which the Tergestino terms are highlighted in italics.

==== Letter from Ascoli to Hugo Schuchardt (Milan, October 12, 1877) ====
A tacere di molt'altro, io convissi con qualche triestino ottuagenario, sul cui labbro ancora risonavano dizioni e frasi dell'antico idioma di Trieste; e più volte, a cagion d'esempio, sentii dire in casa sua: a si dan di chisg' cias (si danno di cotesti casi), dove abbiamo la evoluzione ladina del CA (casus) in un esempio che nel lessico del Friuli più non occorre. E le 'sette case gentilizie' di Trieste le ho sentite dir le tante volte: lis siét ciasádis.

==== Letter from Ascoli to Oddone Zenatti (Milan, October 6, 1888) ====
Un mio vecchio zio p.e., il quale non era mai uscito da Trieste e punto punto non sapeva del friulano del Friuli, diceva, per significar la ‘vecchia nobiltà triestina’, lis siét ciasàdis, e nell'infastidirsi per la soverchia abondanza delle parole: ciàculis no fas frìtulis.

==== Cavalli's Note in the Ladin Relics (1893) ====
In a note from the "Ladin Relics" [ 59 ] Jacopo Cavalli reports a third childhood reminiscence of Ascoli: lustrissen de chilò (illustrissimo di qui, most illustrious from here), to indicate "a pure-blooded aristocrat, but more or less plucked".

=== Peter Tomasin ===
Among the sources cited by Mario Doria in the lexicon-concordance of the Tergestino dialect there are also some proverbs coming from a manuscript by Don Pietro Tomasin (1845-1925) dating back to around 1880. The manuscript, containing a collection of Triestine proverbs and sayings, was published in installments in 1985 as an insert to the magazine Abitare Trieste, edited by Giuseppe Radole:

115) Bisogna spietà la vita de un omis per uedè el frut del auliu. (Must pity the life of an omis per uedè el frut del auliu.)
“Bisogna aspettare la vita di un uomo per vedere il frutto dell'olivo”. This is the only proverb in the ancient Trieste dialect that we were able to find.

286) De Chiopris e no de Daris. (De Chiopris and not de Daris.)
This is an old Trieste proverb from the time when the ancient, almost Friulian, slang was spoken in our city. It names the two saints Copres and Dario to describe a greedy man always ready to gain but never willing to give.

300) Pari cun Pari e mena ‘l mus a bevi. (Pair with Pair and take the mouse to drink.)
This very ancient proverb would now sound like: ogni simile ama il suo simile, while originally it said that Paris and his equal lead the donkey to the fountain.

=== Dante Vaglieri ===
After reading the "Ladin Relics", the Trieste archaeologist Dante Vaglieri (1865-1913) wrote a letter from Rome to Jacopo Cavalli in which he reported his family's memories of the Tergestino dialect and in particular those of his mother. In the letter, of which the most significant passages are reported below, some expressions in Tergestino are also cited, highlighted in italics in the text.

“Io ignorava che Ella raccogliesse da persone viventi ricordi dell'antico dialetto triestino, altrimenti Le avrei scritto prima. Lontano dagli studi linguistici, non mi sono immischiato nella questione sollevata dal mio ex condiscepolo al Ginnasio Comunale di Trieste, prof. Oddone Zenatti. Avrei potuto dire che in mia famiglia c'erano sempre vividi dei ricordi di un dialetto friulano parlato a Trieste e che tuttora mia madre usa la frase le (non lis) trèdis ciazàdis.”

“Ora la mamma – appena cinquantenne – ricorda benissimo, che suo zio Giovanni Castellitz, nato circa il 4 o il 5, e morto non molti anni fa – cioè ancora a mio ricordo – usava nel parlare certe frasi e parole friulane. Le ho letto jersera il colloquio colla signora de Jenner ed ella riconobbe le parole: ze fastu, ze àstu fat, la fèmina, el ciaf: dice però di ricordarsi ciaudiara, non ciaudiera e aggiunge ancora – e questo non soltanto per averlo udito dallo zio – el me sor pari, me dona mari.”

=== Lorenzo Lorenzutti ===
Lorenzo Lorenzutti, president of the Minerva Society for a long time, in a book on Trieste folklore (Vecchia Trieste, Granellini di Sabbia) published in 1907, dedicates a chapter to the Tergestinian, in which among other things he reports some personal memories (the words of Tergestinian origin are in italics):

"Mi ricordo di aver io stesso inteso da mia nonna, da parenti e da coetanee di lei a dire p.e.: braida per brolo o vigneto, a dir olsa per azzarda, polsa per riposa, a dir sfanta per svanisce, a dire zogar a barba jata per giuocare a mosca cieca; ora della braida non si ricorda quasi nessuno, ma le altre frasi e l'ultima voce non sono ancora spente. E non abbiamo ancora tra i nostri detti proverbiali questi due: Da Santa Luzia a Nadal, el cress un pas de gial e: febrarut piez de dut?"

=== Mario Doria ===
In an article published in 1992 and entitled Reliquiae tergestinae novissimae, Mario Doria reports a story told to him by a colleague, Professor Decio Gioseffi, who in turn had learned it from his grandmother around 1920. The story speaks of three sisters looking for a husband whose mother, on the occasion of a visit from a suitor, advises them not to open their mouths as they are not able to speak properly. The three sisters, however, are unable to keep quiet; in fact, during the visit the pot of milk suddenly begins to boil and the youngest sister exclaims:

- La tecia clocene

e la seconda risponde: (and the second one answers:)

- Ciapa caciul e mlecene!

La terza, che si riteneva la più saggia, aggiunge ad alta voce: (The third, who thought she was the wisest, added aloud:)

- Beata mi che tacene, e me mariderai

A sentire questo miscuglio linguistico il pretendente scappa a gambe levate. (Upon hearing this linguistic mixture, the suitor runs away as fast as he can.)

The story is clearly intended to poke fun at an old way of speaking, now uncommon and perceived as crude and incorrect. The anecdote deliberately emphasizes the language's strangeness by mixing elements of various origins (for example, the verb ending -ene or the absence of the definite article in the second sentence, which are clearly reminiscent of Slovenian), but the Tergestino imprint is recognizable in at least three elements: the verb clocene (from clocià= scoppiettare, crackle, ribollireto, to boil), the noun caciul (mestolo, ladle), and the verb form me mariderai (mi sposerò, I will get married). Added to these three words is mlecene, which represents a hybrid between a possible Tergestino misclizà (mescolare, to mix) and the Slovenian mleko (latte, milk).
