= Ertano dialect =

Dialect of Friulian

Ertano
- furlan di Nert
- Native to: Italy
- Region: Erto e Casso and Vajont
- Ethnicity: Friulians
- Language family: Indo-European: Italic; Latino-Faliscan; Latinic; Romance; Italo-Western; Western; Gallo-Iberian?; Gallo-Romance; Gallo-Rhaetian?; Rhaeto-Romance; Friulian; West Friulian; Ertano

Language codes
- ISO 639-3: –
- Glottolog: None
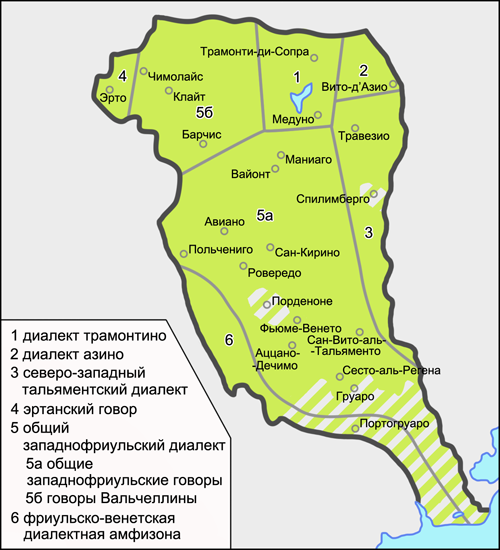
- Map of West Friulian dialects, including Ertano

Ertano is a dialect of the West Friulian spoken in the village of Erto in the extreme west of the Province of Pordenone in the Friuli-Venezia Giulia region of Italy and among settlers from Erto in the village of Vajont in the central regions of the Province of Pordenone. It has a number of significant differences from other dialects of West Friulian, which characterizes the Ertano dialect as one of the most specific dialects of the West Friulian area. It retains a large number of features that developed under the influence of Venetian. The Ertano dialect can be considered not only as a dialect of Friulian, but also as a dialect of the Ladin or as a transitional dialect from Ladin to Friulian.

== Geography ==
The majority of speakers of the Ertano dialect are residents of the village of Erto, one of two settlements that make up the commune of Erto e Casso, in the northwestern part of the province of Pordenone in the region of Friuli-Venezia Giulia. To the west of the Ertanese area are the areas of distribution of the Venetic and Ladin dialects, to the east is the area of the dialects of the upper part of the Valcellina valley of Common West Friulian. Some speakers of the Ertanese dialect, after the destruction of the dam on the Vajont River in 1963, moved to the village of Vajont, built in 1971 in the central regions of the Province of Pordenone.

The location of the village of Erto on the outskirts of the Friulian area, adjacent to the Venetian and Ladin areas, has affected the dialectal features of the Ertano dialect. This dialect shows significant Venetian influence and the presence of linguistic features of the Ladin type. The latter fact gave grounds to classify the Ertano dialect as a dialect of Ladin. This point of view was supported by such researchers of Romance languages as Graziadio Isaia Ascoli, Theodor Gartner and Carlo Battisti. Other researchers, in particular G. Francescato, include the Ertano dialect in the Friulian linguistic area (based on phonetic features). At the same time, the Ertano dialect, along with two dialects of the Province of Belluno, Comelic and Ampezano, are also distinguished as transitional from Ladin to Friulian.

The commune of Erto e Casso, in addition to Erto, also includes the village of Casso, which was founded significantly later than Erto. The founders of this village were immigrants from Veneto. The Casso dialect belongs to the Venetic linguistic area and differs significantly from the Ertanese dialect. At the same time, the Friulian dialect of the commune of Cimolais, neighboring Erto e Casso, is close to Ertano.

== Phonetic features ==
The main dialectal phonetic features of the Erto dialect include:

- The absence of phonological contrast between long and short vowels , as in other dialects of the West Friulian area;
- Vowel transition ɛ > ɛj: bɛjf “he drinks” along with ɛ > iæ: diæs “ten” (in other West Friulian dialects - ɛ > ej: dejs);
- Transition of vowels ɔ, o > ɛw: fɛwk "fire", ðɛwf "yoke";
- Vowel transition a > ɛ: melɛ́ "sick";
- Change of Latin CA into ʃa: ʃasa "house" - in the Central-Eastern dialects: k'aza (in the Gorizian dialect), t͡ʃaze (in the dialects of the cities of Udine and Cividale, as well as in the Central-Southern dialects);
- Change of Latin C, G before E, I in θ, ð: fáθa "face" and mólðe "to milk";
- Loss of -t and -f in word-final position: portɛ́ "brought", ʃɛ "head" in Common Friulian portât, cjâf;
- Changes in diphthongs in cases like míak "my", t͡ʃíak "your", etc.

== Bibliography ==
- О. И Романова (2001). "Фриульский язык". Языки мира. Романские языки. Moscow: Academia. pp. 367–391. ISBN 5-87444-016-X.
- Roseano, P. (2015). "Suddivisione dialettale del friulano". In S. Heinemann; L. Melchior (eds.). Manuale di linguistica friulana (PDF) (in Italian). Berlin: De Gruyter Mouton. pp. 162–163. ISBN 978-3-11-031059-7.
