= Società filologica friulana =

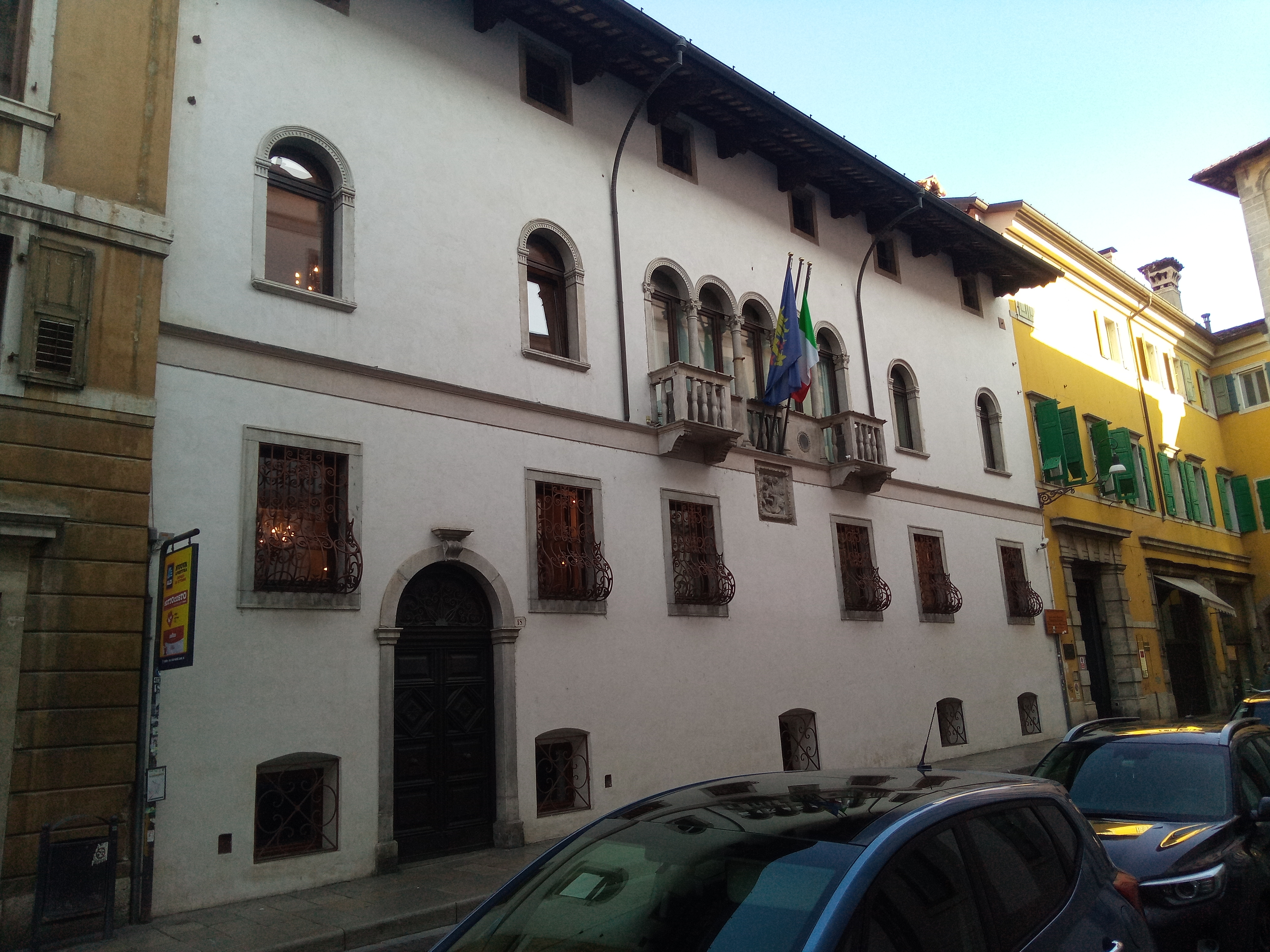
The society's headquarters in Palazzo Mantica, Udine

The Società filologica friulana (Friulian Philological Society) is an association whose aim is to safeguard the Friulian language and culture, established in Gorizia on 23 November 1919.

The founders were some representatives of Friulian culture, such as Giovanni Lorenzoni (who was its first president), Bindo Chiurlo, Ugo Pellis, Ercole Carletti. It was named after the glottologist from Gorizia Graziadio Isaia Ascoli, who founded the studies of dialectology in Italy and who was the first to scientifically describe the Friulian language in the inaugural issue of the journal Archivio glottologico italiano. The company was recognized as a non-profit organization in 1936.

Its purposes, according to the statute, are the promotion of the Friulian language and the protection of its linguistic minority, the study and knowledge of the Friulian culture in its various aspects (philology), literature, history, history of art, music, entertainment), the protection of Friulian cultural heritage and the promotion of knowledge of minority languages and cultures in general.

The association brings together several thousand members and cultivates relationships and cultural exchanges with other associations, organizations and universities. It contributed to the creation of the Italian Linguistic Atlas (Atlante linguistico italiano) and the Friulian Historical Linguistic Ethnographic Atlas (Atlante storico linguistico etnografico friulano).

It is headquartered in Udine, with branch offices also in Gorizia (eastern Friuli), Pordenone (western Friuli) and Tolmezzo (Carnia).
