= Faggin =

Faggin is an Italian surname. Notable people with the surname include:

- Federico Faggin, Physicist, engineer, inventor and entrepreneur
- Leandro Faggin (1933–1970), Italian cyclist

== See also ==
- Faggin–Nazzi alphabet
