= Faggin–Nazzi alphabet =

Orthography for Friulian

The Faggin–Nazzi alphabet is an orthographic system proposed to write Friulian, a Romance language spoken in northeastern Italy. The alphabet is named after its creators, Giorgio Faggin and Gianni Nazzi. It was created before the now-standard Friulian orthography developed by Spanish linguist Xavier Lamuela. Today, Faggin–Nazzi is rarely used, also because it uses letters typical of Slavic languages, such as č, which are unfamiliar for most Friulians due to dissimilarity from the Italian alphabet. The alphabet consists of the following letters: A a, B b, C c, Č č, D d, E e, F f, G g, Ǧ ǧ (or Ğ ğ), H h, I i, J j, L l, M m, N n, O o, P p, Q q, R r, S s, Š š, T t, U u, V v, X x, Z z.

== Differences from standard orthography ==
- C before E or I in standard orthography is spelled as Z
- Ç in standard orthography is spelled as Č
- CJ in standard orthography is spelled as ČH
- Z before E or I in standard orthography is spelled as G
- The words zâl and za in standard orthography are spelled as ǧâl and ǧa
- GJ in standard orthography is spelled as G before E or I, and as ǦH elsewhere
- I between vowels in standard orthography is spelled as J
- S at the beginning of words and SS in the middle of words in standard orthography are both spelled as Š
- The digraph ‘S in standard orthography is spelled as X
