= West Friulian =

Dialect of Friulian

- Concordiese Friulian
- Furlan concuardiês
- Native to: Italy
- Region: western Friuli-Venezia Giulia
- Ethnicity: Friulians
- Language family: Indo-European: Italic; Latino-Faliscan; Latinic; Romance; Italo-Western; Western; Gallo-Iberian?; Gallo-Romance; Gallo-Rhaetian?; Rhaeto-Romance; Friulian; West Friulian
- Dialects: Ertano

Language codes
- ISO 639-3: –
- Glottolog: west2338
- Linguasphere: 51-AAA-mb
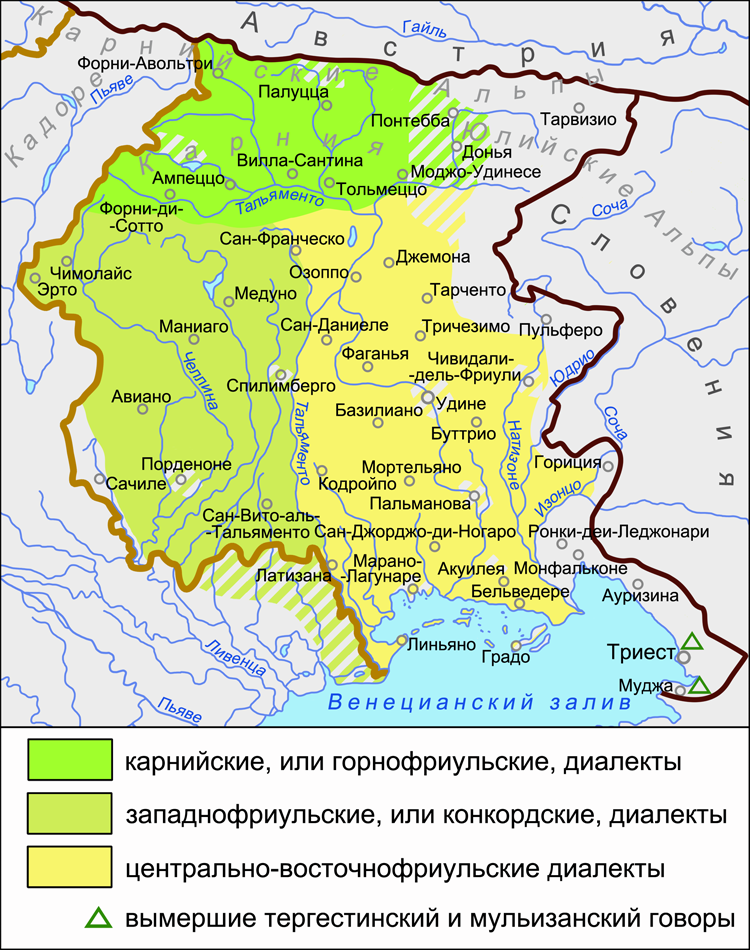
- The area of the West Friulian dialects on the map of the distribution of the dialects of the Friulian language.

West Friulian (also known as Concordiese Friulian) is a group of dialects of Friulian that are spoken in the western part of the Friuli-Venezia Giulia region of Italy, that is around the west of the middle and lower reaches of the Tagliamento. They form one of the three main Friulian dialect groups, along with the Carnic and Central-Eastern dialects.

West Friulian, compared to other Friulian dialects, is the most innovative and most influenced by Venetian. The Italian writer and film director Pier Paolo Pasolini wrote poetry in West Friulian of the village of Casarsa della Delizia.

== Classification ==
According to the classification published in the article “Friulian language” (publication “ Languages of the world”), the West Friulian group of dialects includes:

- Common West Friulian dialect (dialects spoken in the area along the Meduna and Cellina rivers):
- Northwest dialect (pre-Alpine dialects of the vicinity of Maniago, Spilimbergo and other settlements);
- Dialects along the lower reaches of the Tagliamento;
- Ertano dialect (in the commune of Erto e Casso);
- Transitional dialect zone (amphizone) from Friulian to Venetian.

According to the classification based on the works of G. Francescato and G. Frau, which is presented in the article by P. Roseano, the following dialects and vernaculars are distinguished in the West Friulian area:

- Common West Friulian dialect:
  - Common West Friulian dialects;
  - Fialects of the upper Valcellina valley;
- Dialect of the region northwest of the Tagliamento in its lower reaches;
- Azino is a dialect of the Val d'Arzino valley;
- Tramontino is a dialect of the Val Tramontina valley;
- Ertano dialect;
- Transitional Friulian-Venetian dialects.

== Geography ==
The West Friulian area encompasses the part of Friuli south of the Carnic Alps and west of the middle and lower reaches of the Tagliamento. According to the modern Regions of Italy, the West Friulian area generally coincides with the borders of the Province of Pordenone in the region of Friuli-Venezia Giulia. The West Friulian area also includes the dialects located in the districts of the Province of Venice adjacent to Friuli, mainly in the vicinity of Portogruaro.

In the north, the area of distribution of the West Friulian borders on the area of the Carnic Friulian, in the east on the area of the Central-Eastern Friulian, in the west - on the area of distribution of Venetian. The peculiarities of the linguistic situation of the West Friulian dialect region include the spread of the Colonian Venetian dialect in large settlements of western Friuli and the spread of dialects of the Northeastern Venetian dialect on the western periphery, in particular, in the cities of Sacile and Pordenone, while in the rural areas around these cities, West Friulian are preserved in everyday life. The Friulian dialects of the western periphery are characterized by code switching and interference with the dialects of Venetian. For example, in the dialect of the village of Vigonovo in the commune of Fontanafredda, an integration of the Friulian and Venetian lexical systems is noted.

== Dialectal features ==
The main dialectal features characteristic of the West Friulian dialects include:

- The absence of phonological opposition between long and short vowels - in central-eastern dialects, long and short vowels are contrasted;
- Diphthongization of the vowels ɛ, e > ej; ɔ, o > ou: dejs "ten", neif "snow", nowf "nine", krows "cross" — in the Central-Eastern Friulian dialects: d i:s "ten", n u:f "nine";
- Vowel transition o > wo in closed and open syllables: rwóda "wheel", kwol "haystack" — in central-eastern Friulian dialects: rwuɛde "wheel";
- The presence of the supporting vowel -e in the central-eastern Friulian dialects the vowel -i is used as the supporting vowel;
- Changes in diphthongs in personal and possessive pronouns in cases like tɔk “your”, ljɛk “she”;
- The presence in the consonant system of the transitions k > t͡ʃ , g > d͡ʒ: t͡ʃan "dog", d͡ʒat "cat"; t͡ʃ > s, d͡ʒ > z: sɛra "wax", zir "circle"; similar changes are characteristic of the dialects of the cities of Udine and Cividale, as well as for the central-southern area of the central-eastern Friulian dialect group;
- The prevalence of the endings -a and -as in feminine nouns , as in the Carnic dialects - in the central-eastern Friulian dialects the plural ending -is is widespread;
- Adding a plural marker to the last member of a nominal syntagma: il giambi dretis "straight legs";
- Distribution of the verb zi "to go" - in the central-eastern Friulian dialects the verb with this meaning has the form la:;
- The presence of a large number of lexical borrowings from Venetian, etc.

In the dialects of the villages of Barcis, Claut and Cimolais, the change of the affricates t͡ʃ and d͡ʒ had its own peculiarities: t͡ʃ > θ (dɔlθ "sweet"), d͡ʒ > ð (péðo "worse"). The appearance of the phonemes / θ / and / ð / is considered to be due to Venetian influence.

The Ertano dialect, which has experienced strong Venetian influence, is characterized by its opposition to all other West Friulian dialects in a number of specific phonetic features.

== Bibliography ==
- О. И Романова (2001). "Фриульский язык". Языки мира. Романские языки. Moscow: Academia. pp. 366–391. ISBN 5-87444-016-X.
