= Regional Agency for Friulian Language =

The Regional Agency for Friulian Language (Friulian: Agjenzie Regjonâl pe Lenghe Furlane, abbr. ARLeF; Italian: Agenzia Regionale per la Lingua Friulana) is a public body of the Autonomous Region of Friuli-Venezia Giulia, Italy, that coordinates activities involving the safeguarding and promotion of the Friulian language across the regional territory. It plays a key role in the implementation of the legislation on the Friulian language, which comprises Regulations on the protection of historical language minorities [State Law] (482) (in Italian). December 15, 1999., Rules for the protection and promotion of the Friulian language and culture and establishment of a service for regional and minority languages [Regional Law] (15) (in Italian). March 22, 1996. as well as Rules for the protection, valorisation and promotion of the Friulian language [Regional Law] (29) (in Italian). December 18, 2007.

The Agency is a regional law body with public legal status, as well as administrative and financial autonomy, that operates under the Comparto unico del pubblico impiego (Framework of the Public Sector Employment) of Friuli-Venezia Giulia. Established by Regional Law no. 4 of 26 February 2001 (art. 6), its operations started in 2005 with the approval of its Statute (Decree of the President of the Region no. 0102/Pres. of 19 April 2005).

The Agency provides a language consultancy service for both public and private bodies and performs diverse actions to promote the presence and advance the use of the Friulian language in the main fields of social life, including the family, the school, mass media, new technologies, public administration, scientific research, show business, the arts, culture and the working environment.

The Agency performs its functions through:

1. direct activities;
2. funds granted to qualified public and private bodies;
3. collaborations with public and private bodies that work in favour of the knowledge, dissemination and use of the Friulian language;
4. study grants.

== Bodies ==
The Agency comprises a Board of Directors, a Technical and Scientific Committee, a Chairman and an Auditor.

=== Board of Directors ===
The Board of Directors is appointed by decree of the President of the Region according to the deliberation of the Regional Government and comprises five members. The names of three of them, including the Chairman, are put forward by the Regional Minister responsible for the protection of the Friulian language. One member is appointed by the Council of Local Autonomies, chosen from among the representatives of the local authorities included in the area of protection by Regulations on the protection of historical language minorities [State Law] (482) (in Italian). December 15, 1999. Finally, one member is appointed by the University of Udine. The Regional Government is entitled to appoint the Chairman of the Agency, who needs to be one of the appointed members of the Board of Directors. The Chairman presides over the meetings of the Board of Directors, coordinates the operations of the Agency and acts as its legal representative.

The Board of Directors performs the following functions:

- adoption of the budget, the Agency’s annual activity programme and the Agency’s closing accounts;
- approval of the guidelines required to achieve the goals of the Agency;
- approval of proposals for amendments to the Statute of the Agency, to be subsequently submitted to the Regional Government for approval;
- appointment of the Technical and Scientific Committee;
- approval of the regulations.

=== Technical and Scientific Committee ===
The Technical and Scientific Committee includes eight scholars, university lecturers or cultural operators boasting wide and considerable experience in planning or implementing initiatives for the teaching and the dissemination of the Friulian language as well as the promotion of its use in all fields of communication and contemporary life.

The members of the Committee are appointed by the Board of Directors for a term of three years and may be reconfirmed.

The composition of the Committee should guarantee a balanced representativeness of complementary disciplinary competencies, in particular:

- experts in linguistics primarily specialising in linguistic planning;
- experts in Friulian language teaching;
- experts in the use of the Friulian language in the mass media;
- experts in the use of the Friulian language in artistic, music and multimedia productions.

The Technical and Scientific Committee performs the following functions:

- supports the Board of Directors in defining the Agency’s annual activity programme;
- supports the Board of Directors in defining a general linguistic policy plan for the Friulian language and in choosing the annual intervention priorities, considering the budget as well;
- regularly provides technical and scientific consultancy to the Agency;
- performs any other function set out by the regional legislation as well as the Agency regulations.

=== Auditor ===
The Auditor is appointed by the decree of the President of the Region on the proposal of the Regional Minister responsible for the protection of the Friulian Language. The Auditor performs auditing functions and has a mandate of three years from the date of his or her appointment and may be reappointed only once.

== Operational Structure ==
The operational structure of the Agency comprises a Director, a Management Office and the Technical and Scientific Staff.

The Director supervises the implementation of the guidelines set out by the administrative bodies of the Agency. In this area, the Director:

- is responsible for implementing the resolutions and measures adopted by the bodies of the Agency, including the guidelines and goals set out by the Board of Directors;
- attends the meetings of the Board of Directors and the Technical and Scientific Committee;
- directs and manages the Management Office and Technical and Scientific Staff, coordinating their activities.

The Management Office reports to the Director and performs management tasks. The office has permanent employees as well as personnel made available by the Regional Authority or other public bodies.

== Regional Linguistic Centre for the Friulian Language ==
Through the Regional Linguistic Centre for the Friulian Language, ARLeF provides services in the areas of linguistic and place naming consultancy, translation, information and guidance relating to the Friulian language. The services provided are addressed to all local authorities, ancillary departments as well as public service licensees included in the relevant territory. In addition, the service may be provided to private individuals, providing it is deemed to be in compliance with the guidelines set out in the regional linguistic policy. The Centre comprises one headquarters and four branches that cover the entire Friulian-speaking territory.

== Projects implemented by ARLeF ==
The Agency engages in a series of direct activities in various fields of social life. Below are some of the most important projects, divided by area.

=== Family ===
Crescere con più lingue (Growing up with more languages) – A project implemented in collaboration with the healthcare authorities of the Friulian-speaking territory that is primarily aimed at promoting among new parents the several cognitive and metacognitive advantages resulting from a multilingual upbringing. The project also aims to overcome the prejudice that may influence the choice of families with respect to multilingual educational paths. Finally, Crescere con più lingue promotes the cultural and linguistic characteristics that are typical of the regional territory, including its “natural multilingualism.”

=== New technologies ===
The Agency has implemented several software tools that facilitate the written usage of the Friulian language according to the norms of the official spelling (set out by Regional Law 15/96 art. 13). On the ARLeF website, users will find the following applications:

- the Grande Dizionario Bilingue Italiano – Friulano (Great Italian – Friulian Bilingual Dictionary), the most complete dictionary in terms of entries and detailed descriptions presently available for the Friulian language, also available as an app on tablets and smartphones;
- the Correttore Ortografico Friulano (Friulian Spell-checker - also COF) enables users to analyse a written document and highlight any spelling mistakes, with suggested corrections;
- the Tastiera Friulana Semplice (Simple Friulian keyboard), a programme that enables users to quickly type in Friulian by simplifying the typing of accented letters and other special characters, thanks to easy combinations of keys.

=== Children ===
Maman! – The first children’s TV show in Friulian. Additionally, the Agency has produced Friulian versions of various cartoons, including Omenuts, Tui e Tuie and Rite e Cjossul. The Agency’s website also offers a fun-learning section totally devoted to children.

=== School ===
Pavee. The magic of Friulian – Institutional information and awareness-raising campaign specifically devised for parents of preschool and school children. The campaign aims to increase the number of parents choosing to enrol their children in the optional Friulian classes when they start to attend kindergarten as well as elementary and lower secondary school.

=== History and culture ===
Fieste de Patrie dal Friûl (Celebration of the Friulian homeland) – With the promulgation of Regional Law no. 6 of 27 March 2015, which aims to remember and celebrate the origins, culture and history of the independence of the Friulian people, ARLeF was entrusted with the task of supervising the organisation of the official ceremonies of the festival as well as over 100 related events held by the local authorities in the Friulian-speaking territory on the 3rd of April each year. The festival commemorates the 3rd of April 1077, a day that marked the foundation of the patriarchal state of Friuli, an institution that reunited the land of Friuli and other territories in a single state organisation and existed until the 15th century, reaching a very advanced level of civil organisation forms at the time.

Teatri Stabil Furlan (Friulian Permanent Theatre) – This project is aimed at establishing a theatrical production organisation in the Friulian language by creating the first network comprising the most qualified entities in the Friulian theatrical and cultural sector. The project stems from the cooperation among ARLeF and various entities including the Municipality of Udine, CSS Teatro stabile di innovazione del Friuli-Venezia Giulia (CSS Permanent Innovation Theatre of Friuli-Venezia Giulia), Fondazione Teatro Nuovo Giovanni da Udine (Giovanni da Udine Theatre Foundation), Accademia di arte drammatica “Nico Pepe” (“Nico Pepe” Academy of Dramatic Art), Società Filologica Friulana (Friulian Philological Society) and Istitût Ladin Furlan Pre Checo Placerean (“Pre Checo Placerean” Ladin-Friulian Cultural Association).

Furlan, lenghe de Europe (Friulian, language of Europe) – A travelling exhibition that presents the concept of Friulian identity in a brief yet detailed way, explains the social and cultural context in which the language has developed and illustrates the linguistic policy strategies pursued in the Friulian-speaking territory.

=== Promotion of the language ===
Al dipent di nô (It’s up to us) – An institutional information and awareness-raising campaign to promote the Friulian language by encouraging people to deliberately speak it in everyday life. The project includes various phases and involves multiple media outlets aiming to reach the inhabitants of Friuli, especially the young people, and inspire them to actively support the Friulian language.

== Projects supported by ARLeF ==
The Agency supports the promotion of the Friulian language in the sectors of publishing, entertainment and scientific research by granting funds through calls for proposals to public and private bodies that intend to implement specific projects.

Among the several projects supported by ARLeF over the past few years there are:

- Suns Europe, the most important European festival of performing arts in a minority language;
- Docuscuele, the “documentation, research and teaching experimentation centre for the Friulian language”, established to create a network among projects and competencies in the teaching of the Friulian language;
- Lenghis-Ladint, a software teaching tool used to teach Friulian in a multilingual context that contains a digital library as well as a wide range of exercises;
- Free&Ulli, GjatUt, Fameis and Cressi par furlan, four series of children’s books;
- INT/ART, a series of documentaries on young artists and creatives who use the Friulian language in their artistic production;
- the films Missus and Predis on the battle fought by the Friulian priests for the recognition of the Friulian language.

== Memorandums of understanding ==
Additionally, the Agency signed a series of memorandums of understanding and launched several collaboration projects with prominent Friulian entities for the promotion of the language in all sectors of society. The memorandums include several activities such as the translation of information and promotional material, the implementation of joint events and multilingual information campaigns.

Following are a few names of entities that established a collaboration with the Agency, which proves the diversity of the scope of the activities carried out: Mittelfest – a festival of music, dance, theatre and visual arts from Central European countries; Isontina Ambiente s.r.l. – the company manages the environmental services in 25 municipalities of the Province of Gorizia; Udinese Calcio S.p.A. (the local premier league soccer team); FUC – Società Ferrovie Udine-Cividale s.r.l. (the company that manages the Udine-Cividale railway services).

== European projects ==
As a partner, the Agency has taken part in several EU projects, including:

- ID-COOP – Identità e cooperativismo in territori di insediamento di minoranze storico-linguistiche (Identity and cooperative movements in territories in which historical language minorities are settled), established with the goal of promoting in an innovative way the connection between cooperative movements and historical language minorities existing in the cross-border areas that participate in the project in order to improve their competitiveness.
- RUSH – Lingue minoritarie e orizzonti plurilingui (Minority languages and multilingual horizons), which sees the collaboration among schools and organisations from Italy, Croatia and Spain, regions marked by the presence of prominent language minorities, with the aim of creating a teaching guide (using the official and minority languages of the regions involved in the project) as well as a centre for the collection and documentation of teaching resources for the circulation and sharing of multilingual educational materials.
- Eumint (Euroregioni, Migrazione e Integrazione) (Euroregions, Migration and Integration), which has the goal of consolidating the cooperation among the institutions of the cross-border area between Austria and Italy, involving the Veneto and Friuli-Venezia Giulia Regional Authorities, the Autonomous Provinces of Trento and Bolzano as well as the Austrian federal states of Tyrol and Carinthia. The main goal is to tackle the social, economic, political and cultural issues connected to the migration flows and reinforce the integration policies in the areas involved in the project.

Additionally, ARLeF is a member of the Network to promote linguistic diversity (NPLD), a pan-European network that works in the field of linguistic policies and planning, highly regarded in the European institutions such as the European Commission, the European Parliament and the Council of Europe. It is an operational platform created to support, protect and promote minority and regional languages from around Europe through an exchange of best practices and information among the experts in the sector.

On the 1st of July 2014 the Regional Council of the Friuli-Venezia Giulia Region officially joined the network. Subsequently, ARLeF was given operational tasks relating to management, organisation and support to the Friuli-Venezia Giulia Regional Authority in the NPLD activities.

== See also ==
- Languages of Italy
- Friulian language
