= Caterina Percoto =

Italian writer

Caterina Marianna Percoto (19 February 1812 – 15 August 1887 in Manzano, Friuli) was a writer from the Austrian Empire and later Austria-Hungary, best remembered for her short stories and fables in Friulian, most notably her collection of Friulian fables titled Racconti (1863).

== Biography ==
Born in a village near Udine, Caterina Percoto lived there most of her life, very much in the manner of the peasants she wrote about. All the same she published stories in Milanese reviews and was in touch with important literary figures, largely thanks to Francesco Dall'Ongaro, who became her literary mentor after receiving an essay she had written on Andrea Maffei's translation of Klopstock's Der Messias. Tommaseo, for instance, wrote a preface to her first collection of Racconti (1858). Some of her stories are in Friulan, particularly the very short ones. In these, and in her stories in Italian, she offers a humane and sensitive picture of peasant life. Like other writers associated with contemporary letteratura rusticale, such as Giulio Carcano and Cesare Correnti, she emphasizes the natural virtues of the peasants in contrast with the vices and artificiality of the urban upper classes. Though her realism is exact, its moralizing aspects link her more firmly to Manzoni than to Verga, for whom she wrote a preface to his Storia di una capinera (1871). Those stories in which she represents Austrian repression in the Friuli are amongst her most uncompromisingly realistic and most heartfelt in their patriotism.
