= Von Wartburg line =

European language border

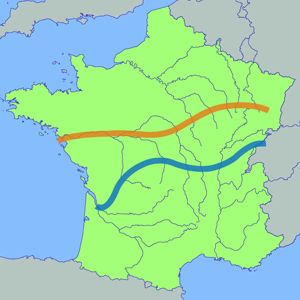
In orange, the von Wartburg line. In blue, the current border between Oïl languages in the North, and Occitan and Franco-Provençal in the South.

The von Wartburg line, also known as the Nantes–Épinal line, is the name commonly given to a language border highlighted by Walther von Wartburg in his 1939 study, Die Entstehung der romanischen Völker ('The Origins of the Romance Peoples'). This line enables a distinction between the northern and southern varieties of Gallo-Romance languages in the 9th century. It was identified for the first time by Jakob Jud.

Languages of the Gallo-Romance sprachbund: 1 Current limits of the Occitan language 2 Old limits of the Occitan language 3 Current limits of Franco-Provençal 4 Old limits of Francoprovencal 5 Southern limits of the French language in the 8th century (von Wartburg line) 6 Southern limits of the French language in the 13th century 7 Limits of Breton in the 19th century 8 Limits of Breton in the 9th century 9 Current limits of Germanic languages in France 10 Historical extent of Oïl languages 11 Historical extent of Germanic languages in France

According to Walther von Wartburg, this linguistic border is the result of Frankish settlement "north of the Loire River" and corresponds to the political and ethnic border that took form around the year 500 between the Frankish kingdom of Neustria in the north, and Aquitaine and Burgundy in the south. For other linguists, the Vulgar Latin spoken in northern Gaul was already different before the Franks' arrival.

With time, this line moved south until becoming the current border of Oïl languages, and Occitan and Franco-Provençal.

== Geographical distribution ==
The von Wartburg starts from the mouth of the Loire, follows the river until the Sologne, before following the Loire again around Cosne-Cours-sur-Loire. From there, it continues north of the Morvan, leaving to the south a significant part of Burgundy and all of Franche-Comté before reaching the south of the Vosges.

== See also ==
- Gallo-Romance languages
- Langues d'oïl
- Franco-Provençal
