= Graziadio Isaia Ascoli =

Italian linguist (1829–1907)

Graziadio Ascoli
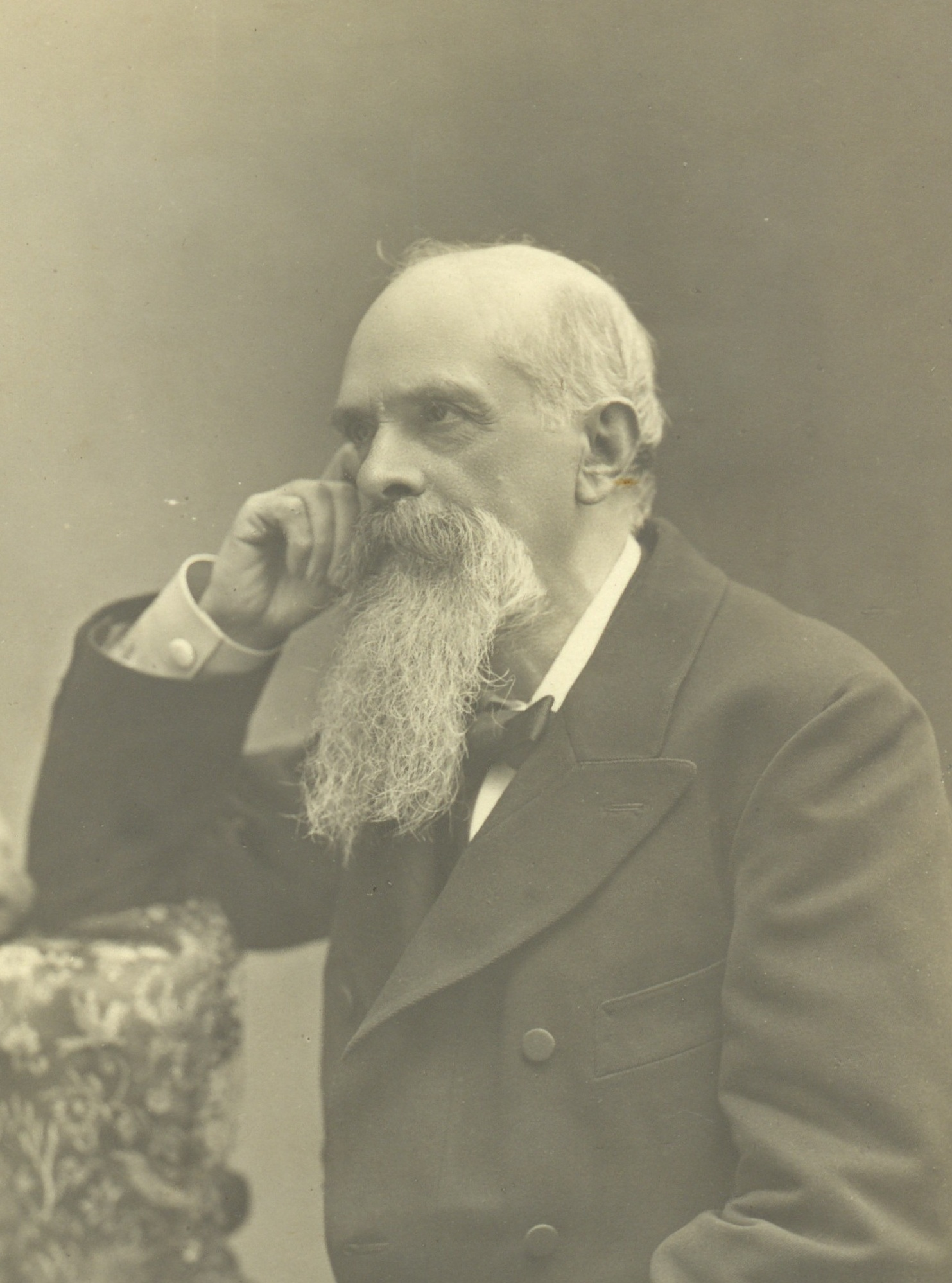
- Graziadio Isaia Ascoli.
- Born: 16 July 1829; Gorizia, Austrian Empire
- Died: 21 January 1907 (aged 77); Milan, Kingdom of Italy
- Occupation: Linguist

Graziadio Isaia Ascoli (pronounced [ɡrattsja(d)ˈdiːo izaˈiːa ˈaskoli]; 16 July 1829 – 21 January 1907) was an Italian linguist.

== Life and work ==
Ascoli was born in an Italian-speaking Jewish family in the multiethnic town of Gorizia, then part of the Austrian Empire (now in Italy). Already as a boy, he learned some of the other languages traditionally spoken in the town: German, Friulian, Slovene, and Venetian.

An autodidact, he published his first important work on the languages of the Orient, Studii orientali e linguistici, in 1854. In 1860, he was appointed a professor of linguistics at the Academy of Science and Letters (Italian: Accademia scientifico-letteraria) in Milan and introduced the study of comparative philology, Romance studies, and Sanskrit.

He made an important contribution to the study of the relationship between Indo-European and Semitic languages and was a pioneer in the study of Romani and Celtic languages.

In Italy, he is above all known for his studies of Italian dialects, which he was first to classify systematically. On the Italian language question (questione della lingua), he did not accept a standard language based on the Florentine dialect as proposed by Alessandro Manzoni, but argued for a leveling of the dialects. In 1873 he founded the journal Archivio glottologico italiano, which became a source of original scholarship on the Italian language.

He was the founder of the substratum theory, which explains instances of formation and development of languages as a result of interference with previous languages spoken by the populations in question.

in 1889 Ascoli was appointed a member of the Senate of the Kingdom of Italy. He was awarded many honorary orders, including the Prussian/German "Pour le Mérite" and the Italian "Ordine civile di Savoia" and "Ordine dei SS. Maurizio e Lazzaro"; he was also a member of many scientific academies, such as the Accademia dei Lincei (since 1875) and the Accademia della Crusca (since 1895).

== Political views ==
Ascoli considered himself foremost a Friulian and a Jew, but also an Italian patriot. One of his most lasting and politically most influential contributions was the coinage of the geographical term Venezia Giulia to denote what was hitherto known as the Austrian Littoral. Ascoli suggested that northeast Italy was composed of three historically, geographically, and culturally interconnected regions, which he called the Three Venices. According to his classification, these three historical-geographical regions were:

- Euganean Venetia (Venezia Euganea), consisting of the Venetia region properly speaking (the current region of Veneto and Friuli);
- Tridentine Venetia (Venezia Tridentina), that is that part of the County of Tyrol that lies south of the Brenner Pass (corresponding to the current Italian region of Trentino-Alto Adige);
- Julian Venetia (Venezia Giulia), which was the area of the Austrian Littoral, plus the Hungarian port of Rijeka (Fiume).

Ascoli coined these names following the internal divisions in the province of Italy during ancient Roman rule, and applied them to the 19th century. His geographical redefinition had a strong political implication: it was aimed at showing that the peripheral areas of the Austrian Empire were in fact gravitating towards Italy. His denomination was soon taken over by Italian irredentists who sought the annexation of the Trentino, the Austrian Littoral, Fiume and Dalmatia to Italy.

In World War I, the terms Venezia Giulia and Venezia Tridentina became the official names for the new territories acquired by Italy from Austria-Hungary with the treaties of Saint Germain and Rapallo. The Kingdom of Italy used Ascoli's terms to replace the previous traditional denominations, Tyrol and Austrian Littoral. The former term fell into disuse after the fall of the Fascist regime. The latter, however, still exists in the name of the Italian region Friuli-Venezia Giulia. The term "Venezia Euganea," on the other hand, never gained any significant support, although it was sporadically used during the Fascist period.

== Bibliography ==
Works published in Italian:

- G.I. Ascoli, La pasitelegrafia, Trieste, Tipografia del Lloyd Austraco, 1851.
- G.I. Ascoli, "Del nesso ario-semitico. Lettera al professore Adalberto Kuhn di Berlino", Il Politecnico, vol. 21 (1864), pp. 190–216.
- G.I. Ascoli, "Del nesso ario-semitico. lettera seconda al professore Francesco Bopp", Il Politecnico, vol. 22 (1864) pp. 121–151.
- G.I. Ascoli, "Studi ario-semitici", Memorie del Reale Istituto Lombardo, cl. II, vol. 10 (1867), pp. 1–36.
- Pier Gabriele Goidànich: ASCOLI, Graziadio Isaia, in: Enciclopedia Italiana, Roma 1929 (online su treccani.it).
- S. Morgana – A. Bianchi Robbiati (curr.), Graziadio Isaia Ascoli "milanese". Giornate di Studio. 28 Febbraio – 1 Marzo 2007, Milano, LED Edizioni Universitarie, 2009, ISBN 978-88-7916-415-3.
