= Gallo-Romance languages =

Branch of the Romance languages

Gallo-Romance
- Geographic distribution: France, San Marino, Monaco, Channel Islands; Parts of Italy, Belgium, Spain, Switzerland, parts of Maghreb, Polynesia, French America
- Linguistic classification: Indo-European: Italic; Latino-Faliscan; Latin; Romance; Italo-Western; Western; Gallo-Iberian; Gallo-Romance
- Early forms: Old Latin: Vulgar Latin; Proto-Romance; Old Gallo-Romance
- Subdivisions: Arpitan–Oïl; Occitano-Romance; Gallo-Italic; Rhaeto-Romance; Moselle Romance †

Language codes
- Glottolog: nort3208 Northwestern Shifted Romance oila1234 Oil
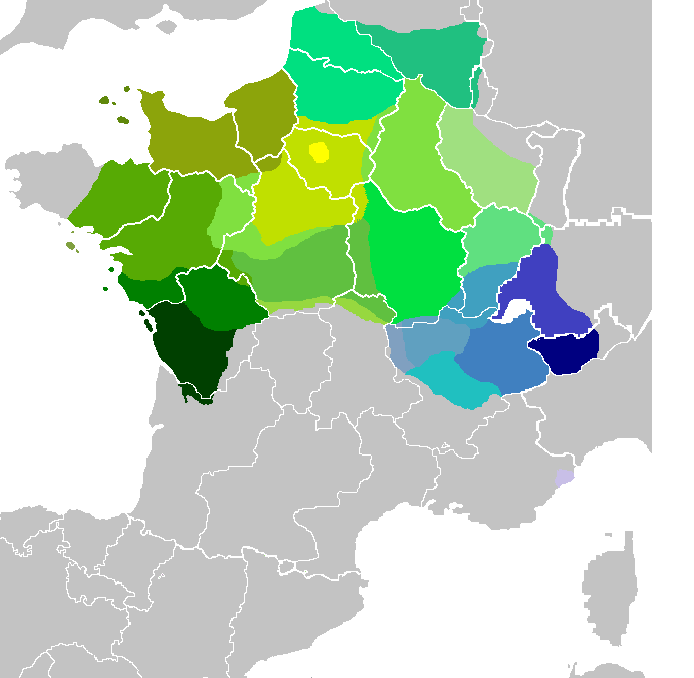
- Main Gallo-Romance languages in Europe, the languages d'Oïl (with French) in green and Arpitan in blue

- Map of native European range of the expanded Gallo-Romance languages. Sometimes these groups are either classified separately or with other linguistic groups

The Gallo-Romance branch of the Romance languages includes in the narrowest sense the langues d'oïl and Franco-Provençal. However, other definitions are far broader and variously encompass the Occitan or Occitano-Romance, Gallo-Italic or Rhaeto-Romance languages.

Old Gallo-Romance was one of the two languages in which the Oaths of Strasbourg were written in 842 AD.

== Classification ==
The Gallo-Romance group includes:

- The langues d'oïl, which include French, Orleanais, Gallo, Angevin, Tourangeau, Saintongeais, Poitevin, Bourguignon, Picard, Walloon, Lorrain and Norman.
- Franco-Provençal in east-central France, western Switzerland and the Aosta Valley region of northwestern Italy. Formerly thought of as a dialect of either the langue d'oïl or Occitan, it is linguistically a language on its own or rather a separate group of languages, as many of its dialects have little mutual intelligibility. It shares features with both French and Occitan.

Other language families often included in Gallo-Romance:

- Occitano-Romance, including languages and dialects such as Catalan and Occitan.
- Rhaeto-Romance, including Romansh of Switzerland, Ladin of the Dolomites area and Friulian of Friuli. Rhaeto-Romance can be classified as either Gallo-Romance or a separate branch within the Western Romance languages. Rhaeto-Romance is a diverse group, with the Italian varieties influenced by Venetian and Italian and Romansh by Franco-Provençal.
- Gallo-Italic, including Piedmontese, Ligurian, Lombard, Emilian, Romagnol, Judeo-Italian, Gallo-Italic of Sicily and Gallo-Italic of Basilicata. Venetian is also part of the Gallo-Italic branch according both to Ethnologue and Glottolog. Gallo-Italic can be classified as either Gallo-Romance or a separate branch of the Western Romance languages. Ligurian and Venetian, if it is considered in the category, retain the final -o and are the exceptions in Gallo-Romance.
- In addition, there are several French-based creole languages such as Haitian Creole.

In the view of some linguists (Pierre Bec, Andreas Schorta, Heinrich Schmid, Geoffrey Hull), Rhaeto-Romance and Gallo-Italic form a single linguistic unity named "Rhaeto-Cisalpine" or "Padanian", which includes also the Venetian and Istriot languages, whose Italianate features are deemed to be superficial and secondary in nature.

== Traditional geographical extension ==
How far the Gallo-Romance languages spread varies a great deal depending on which languages are included in the group. Those included in its narrowest definition (the langues d'oïl and Arpitan) were historically spoken in the northern half of France, including parts of Flanders, Alsace and part of Lorraine; the Wallonia region of Belgium; the Channel Islands; parts of Switzerland; and Northern Italy.

Today, a single Gallo-Romance language (French) dominates much of the geographic region (including the formerly-non-Romance areas of France) and has also spread overseas.

At its broadest, the area also encompasses Southern France; Catalonia, the Valencian Community, and the Balearic islands in eastern Spain; Andorra; and much of Northern Italy. The historical border between the Northern and Southern varieties of Gallo-Romance languages has been called the Von Wartburg line.

== General characteristics ==
The Gallo-Romance languages are generally considered the most innovative (least conservative) among the Romance languages. Northern France, the medieval area of the langue d'oïl from which modern French developed, was the epicentre. Characteristic Gallo-Romance features generally developed the earliest, appear in their most extreme manifestation in the langue d'oïl and gradually spread out from there along riverways and roads. The earliest vernacular Romance writing occurred in Northern France, as the development of vernacular writing in a given area was forced by the almost total inability of Romance speakers to understand Classical Latin, which was still the vehicle of writing and culture.

Gallo-Romance languages are usually characterised by the loss of all unstressed final vowels other than /-a/ (most significantly, final /-o/ and /-e/ were lost). However, when the loss of a final vowel would result in an impossible final cluster (e.g. /tr/), an epenthetic vowel appears in place of the lost vowel, usually /e/. Generally, the same changes also occurred in final syllables closed by a consonant. Franco-Provençal, however, generally preserves the original final vowel after a syllable-final cluster, such as quattuor "four" > quatro (compare French quatre). The Gallo-Romance languages also have historically used a Celtic counting system of base twenty as opposed to Latin base ten.

Furthermore, loss of /e/ in a final syllable was early enough in Primitive Old French that the Classical Latin third-person singular /t/ was often preserved: venit "he comes" > /ˈvɛːnet/ (Romance vowel changes) > /ˈvjɛnet/ (diphthongization) > /ˈvjɛned/ (lenition) > /ˈvjɛnd/ (Gallo-Romance final vowel loss) > /ˈvjɛnt/ (final devoicing). Elsewhere, final vowel loss occurred later, or unprotected /t/ was lost earlier (perhaps under Italian influence).

Other than southern Occitano-Romance, the Gallo-Romance languages are quite innovative, with French and some of the Gallo-Italian languages rivalling each other for the most extreme phonological changes compared with more conservative languages. For example, French sain, saint, sein, ceint, seing meaning "healthy, holy, breast, (he) girds, signature" (Latin sānum, sanctum, sinum, cingit, signum) are all pronounced /sɛ̃/.

In other ways, however, the Gallo-Romance languages are conservative. The older stages of many of the languages are famous for preserving a two-case system, consisting of nominative and oblique cases, which was fully marked on nouns, adjectives and determiners; was inherited almost directly from the Latin nominative and accusative cases; and preserved a number of different declensional classes and irregular forms.

In the opposite of the normal pattern, the languages closest to the oïl epicentre preserve the case system the best, and languages at the periphery (near languages that had long before lost the case system except for pronouns) lost it early. For example, the case system was preserved in Old Occitan until around the 13th century but had already been lost in Old Catalan although there were very few other differences between them.

The Occitan group is known for an innovatory /ɡ/ ending on many subjunctive and preterite verbs and an unusual development of [ð] (Latin intervocalic -d-), which, in many varieties, merged with [dz] (from intervocalic palatalised -c- and -ty-).

The following tables show two examples of the extensive phonological changes that French has undergone. (Compare modern Italian saputo, vita, which are even more conservative than the reconstructed Western Romance forms.)

Extensive reduction in French: sapv̄tvm > su /sy/ "known"
Language	Change	Form	Pronun.
Classical Latin	Basic form in the accusative case.	sapūtum	/saˈpuːtũ/
Vulgar Latin	Vowel length is replaced by vowel quality	sapūtum	/saˈputũ/
Western Romance	vowel changes, first lenition	sabudo	/saˈbudo/
Gallo-Romance	loss of final vowels	sabud	/saˈbud/
	second lenition	savuḍ	/saˈvuð/
	final devoicing	savuṭ	/saˈvuθ/
	loss of /v/ near rounded vowel	seüṭ	/səˈuθ/
Old French	fronting of /u/	seüṭ	/səˈyθ/
	loss of dental fricatives	seü	/səˈy/
French	collapse of hiatus	su	/sy/

Extensive reduction in French: vītam > vie /vi/ "life"
Language	Change	Form	Pronun.
Classical Latin	Basic form in the accusative case.	vītam	/ˈwiːtãː/
Vulgar Latin	Vowel length is replaced by vowel quality and /w/ becomes fricative/approximant	vītam	/ˈβitã/
Western Romance	vowel changes, first lenition	vida	/ˈvida/
Old French	second lenition, final /a/ lenition to /ə/	viḍe	/ˈviðə/
	loss of dental fricatives	vie	/ˈviə/
French	loss of final schwa	vie	/vi/

These are the notable characteristics of the Gallo-Romance languages:

- Early loss of all final vowels other than /a/ is the defining characteristic, as was noted above. One major exception is the Ligurian language, where apocope only occurred after nasal consonants.
- Further reductions of final vowels in langue d'oïl and many Gallo-Italic languages, with the feminine /a/ and epenthetic vowel /e/ merging into /ə/, which was often subsequently dropped.
- Early heavy reduction of unstressed vowels in the interior of a word, which is another defining characteristic. It and final vowel reduction are most of the extreme phonemic differences between the Northern and the Central Italian dialects, which otherwise share a great deal of vocabulary and syntax.
- Loss of the final vowels phonemicised the long vowels, which had been automatic concomitants of stressed open syllables. The phonemic long vowels are maintained directly in many Northern Italian dialects. Elsewhere, phonemic length was lost, but many of the long vowels had been diphthongised, which resulted in the maintenance of the original distinction. The langue d'oïl branch was again at the forefront of innovation, with at least five of the seven long vowels diphthongising (only high vowels were spared).
- Front rounded vowels are present in all branches except Catalan. /u/ usually fronts to /y/ (typically along with a shift of /o/ to /u/), and mid-front rounded vowels /ø ~ œ/ often develop from long /oː/ or /ɔː/.
- Extreme and repeated lenition occurs in many languages, especially in langue d'oïl and many Gallo-Italian languages. Examples from French: ˈvītam > vie /vi/ "life"; *saˈpūtum > su /sy/ "known"; similarly vu /vy/ "seen" < *vidūtum, pu /py/ "been able" < *potūtum, eu /y/ "had" < *habūtum. Examples from Lombard: *"căsa" > "cà" /ka/ "home, house"
- Most langue d'oïl dialects (except Norman and Picard) and Swiss Rhaeto-Romance languages and many northern Occitan dialects have a secondary palatalization of /k/ and /ɡ/ before /a/, with different results because of the primary Romance palatalisation: centum "hundred" > cent /sɑ̃/, cantum "song" > chant /ʃɑ̃/.
- Other than Occitano-Romance languages, most Gallo-Romance languages are subject-obligatory, but all other Romance languages are pro-drop languages. That is a late development triggered by progressive phonetic erosion. Old French was still a null-subject language until the loss of secondary final consonants in Middle French caused verb forms (e.g. aime/aimes/aiment; viens/vient) to be pronounced the same.

Gallo-Italian languages have a number of features in common with the other Italian languages:

- Loss of final /s/, which triggers raising of the preceding vowel (more properly, the /s/ "debuccalises" to /j/, which is monophthongised into a higher vowel): /-as/ > /-e/, /-es/ > /-i/, hence Standard Italian plural cani < canes, subjunctive tu canti < tū cantēs, indicative tu cante < tū cantās (now tu canti in Standard Italian, borrowed from the subjunctive); amiche "female friends" < amīcās. The palatalisation in the masculine amici /aˈmitʃi/, compared with the lack of palatalisation in amiche /aˈmike/, shows that feminine -e cannot come from Latin -ae, which became /ɛː/ by the 1st century AD and would certainly have triggered palatalisation.
- Use of nominative -i for the masculine plural, instead of the accusative -os.
