= Friulians =

Northern Italian ethnolinguistic minority

Furlans
- Flag of Friuli

Regions with significant populations
- Friuli-Venezia Giulia: ~1,000,000 (Note: Combined population of Gorizia, Udine, and Pordenone.)
- Brazil: ~100,000
- Argentina: ~95,000
- Canada: ~25,000
- United States: ~20,000
- Australia: ~900
- Slovenia: ~800
- Libya: (historically, sizeable portion of Italian settlers in Libya)
- Egypt: (historically)

Languages
- Friulian, Italian, Slovene; Minority: Venetian, Triestine

Religion
- Roman Catholicism

Related ethnic groups
- Ladins, Romansh

Friulians, also called Friulans or Furlans (Friulian: Furlans, Italian: Friulani, Slovene: Furlani), are a Romance ethnic group and native to Friuli region of Italy, although they have a significant diaspora community.

They natively speak the Rhaeto-Romantic language Friulian, which is closely related to Ladin, spoken primarily in South Tyrol/Alto Adige, and Romansh, native to the Canton of Grisons in Switzerland.

== Distribution ==
About 600,000 Friulians live in the historical region of Friuli and parts of Veneto. As the Friulian language's use has decreased, there are around 1 million in total, with an increasing amount speaking Italian as a first language. Some other thousands live in diaspora communities in the United States, Canada, Argentina, Brazil, Uruguay, Venezuela, Australia, and Belgium.

They traditionally speak Friulan, a distinct Rhaeto-Romance language which is the second largest recognized minority language in Italy after Sardinian. Genetically, Friulians cluster with broader Europe populations although still show the greatest genetic similarity with the other Italian populations. Friulians have served during the First World War, notably at the Battle of Vittorio Veneto, where 7,000 Friulians were captured by the Italian Army. Friulians also served in the Second World War, but only a few records remain on the topic.

=== United States ===
During the 1880s, many Italians, especially Friulians, started to move around the world. The reasons why they moved included to find work, find new professions, and some socio-political factors. The United States were the most popular location to start anew. However, many of these emigrants returned home due to the Americans importing cheap labour.

This situation changed in the last quarter of the 19th century when the U.S. welcomed about 800,000 Italians, mainly consisting of Southern Italians, Venetians, and Friulians.

Italians in the U.S. were excluded from the best-paid jobs. They had a bad reputation due to the stereotypes that were attached to them. However, this was not the case for the Friulians. They were well known for their ability of mosaicists and were considered to be highly specialized laborers.

=== Canada ===
Italy experienced a vast migration phenomenon, caused by the political and economical situation of the country, with many Friulians leaving for Canada. There are now several first-hand testimonies, literature studies, and writings by Friulian-Canadians. The reconstruction of the emigration phenomenon is more recent.

=== Argentina ===
After a short period of time, Friulian immigrants reached Argentina lands from Brazil.

The first agricultural nucleus populated by a relatively large group of Friulian peasants arose not very distant from Reconquista, in the northern part of the Santa Fe province.

Along the 1880s, the number of arrivals slowly lost consistency, and in the first years of the 1900s, the phenomenon displayed different characteristics than before. In this last period, Friulians preferred the capital, Buenos Aires, while a smaller number of emigrants settled in the other provinces' capitals, such as Córdoba or Rosario.

After World War I, emigration once again was one of the most suitable ways to solve the problems that afflicted Friulians. After 1919, Argentina and France welcomed the largest number of Friulians than any other countries.

There was a new migratory wave after World War II, a period that coincided with the Argentine economic boom. However, during the late 1970s, a movement in the opposite direction began, aggravated by the Argentine economic crisis.

From 1989 to 1991, children, grandchildren, and great-grandchildren of Italian emigrants in Argentina returned to Friuli-Venezia Giulia.

=== Brazil ===
The first news of Friulians reaching Brazil as emigrants dates back to 1872. The farmers of Friuli were the ones mostly involved in moving to Brazil.

In Casso, the westernmost point of Friuli, departures to the countryside of Brazil began in September 1877. The remarkable increase in emigration within Friuli and Veneto in the second half of the 1880s derives from the worsening of the agrarian crisis, when inflows of agricultural products from abroad led to the fall in cereal prices and the worsening of farmers' living conditions. In the case of Caneva, for example, the departures to Brazil registered a remarkable growth during 1887.

The territories of the current states of Rio Grande do Sul, Santa Catarina, Paraná, Mato Grosso do Sul, Mato Grosso, Minas Gerais, Espírito Santo, Maranhão, and Pará were the ones that received Friulian immigrants.

Based on estimates for Italian immigrants that lasted until 1915, around 84% of those who arrived in the country from Friuli remained in Brazil.

=== Australia ===
A group (totaling about 200 people) of Friulians and Venetians arrived in Sydney in April 1881, after a journey around the pacific isles. No more Friulians came for a few decades until after World War II. Some people from Friuli and parts of Croatia near Friuli immigrated to Australia. However, during the 1970s, they started moving back to Italy. Their reasons varied, including the global recession in the beginning of the 1970s, the industrial and tourism development by areas that had once seen a critical exodus, to help with the reconstruction of areas affected by the 1976 Friuli earthquake, and judicious laws aimed at encouraging returns.

=== Belgium ===
Right after the end of World War I, the migratory masses started to flow from Italy to Belgium. This was caused by the fact that Belgium needed workers to begin post-war reconstruction of the country, and started a new call for recruiting workers. Italians were the first ones who responded to the call, with 23,000 being involved.

Years later, departures were organized by Italian and Belgian authorities to help the migrants. They started a recruitment process which was managed by the Belgian employers offices, who transmitted the immigration forms to the Italian authorities. This process was dealt with by the offices in Milan and Brussels.

In 1908 a new office was created in Udine, that operated as an employment agency for overseas jobs. The Italian offices were responsible for sending their workforce to these countries. In 1922, the Provincial Employment Office in Udine had 8,306 reservations, and the office sent 4,843 workers abroad that year alone. Compared to the year before, the office managed the application of 3,411 more workers.

To speed things up, the emigration office published in 1992 the "Special guidelines for those leaving for Belgium". This pamphlet speaks volumes about the importance given to the Belgian emigration for the Friulan population.

== Friulian population stereotypes ==
Friulian stereotypes date back to literature from the 19th century. The typical Friulian is described in Il Cjant de Filologiche furlane (The Song of the Friulian Philologists) as "steadfast, honest, and hard-working", referring to the figure of the "good farmer".

The Regional Agency for Friulian Language suggests a five-dimensional model to characterise Friulian population:

1. A people of farmers, therefore attached to the land and close to nature; organised in strong family structures and small village communities; hard-working with also good entrepreneurial skills; traditionalist and true to its word;
2. A people of Christians, thus of believers, set within the great Catholic tradition, gifted with the virtues of simplicity, humbleness, austerity, ability to withstand the rigors of life with patience and determination.
3. A Nordic population: and therefore strong, serious, slow, taciturn, disciplined, with good organizational skills and sense of community, but with a background of existential sadness that is soothed by hard work but also by wine and expressed by choral singing.
4. A border people: situated in a location exposed to risks, toughened up by a very long history of invasions, plunders and battles; but also with the possibility of opening up and having positive relationships with the neighbouring peoples and other cultures, to mix with them, to welcome them and be welcomed by them;
5. A migrant people: since time immemorial, the imbalance between the population and the resources of the region has forced a number of people to leave their homeland, to seek employment and survival in other countries. Love strengthens in the pain of departure, and an idealised image of one's own country consolidates in the discomfort of being away from home. Fogolârs are recreated in the arrival communities and the language and traditions are preserved. However, it is worth underlining that this model mostly reflects a historical and social reality that is rather circumscribed: the reality of Friuli between 1870 and 1970.

== The Friulan language ==
The Friulan language is detached from other Rhaeto-Romance languages because of the influence exerted by Latin. It is considered one of the most complete languages within the Rhaeto-Romance family, thanks to its vast vocabulary. Nevertheless, studies about the Rhaeto-Romance languages show phonetic commonalities with French, which suggest unique roots. Interestingly, the same studies hold that the different dialects spoken in Friuli are not more related to each other than they are to French.

== See also ==
- Demographics of Italy
- 212705 Friûl, an asteroid named in honor of the Friuli region
