= Phonological history of French =

Phonetic changes in the French language

French exhibits perhaps the most extensive phonetic changes from Latin of any of the Romance languages. Similar changes are seen in some of the northern Italian regional languages, such as Lombard or Ligurian. Most other Romance languages are significantly more conservative phonetically, with Spanish, Italian, and especially Sardinian showing the most conservatism, and Portuguese, Romanian, Catalan, and Occitan showing moderate conservatism.

French also shows enormous phonetic changes between the Old French period and the modern language. Spelling, however, has barely changed, which accounts for the wide differences between current spelling and pronunciation. Some of the most profound changes have been:

- The loss of almost all final consonants.
- The occasional elision of final /ə/, which caused many newly-final consonants.
- The loss of the formerly strong stress that had characterized the language throughout much of its history and triggered many of the phonetic changes.
- Significant transformations in the pronunciation of vowels, especially nasal vowels.

Only some of the changes are reflected in the orthography, which generally corresponds to the pronunciation of c. 1100–1200 CE (the Old French period) rather than modern pronunciation.

This page documents the phonological history of French from a relatively technical standpoint. See also History of French § Internal phonological history for a less technical introduction.

== Overview ==
A profound change in very late spoken Latin (Vulgar Latin, the forerunner of all the Romance languages) was the restructuring of the vowel system of Classical Latin. Latin had thirteen distinct vowels: ten pure vowels (long and short versions of ⟨a, e, i, o, u⟩), and three diphthongs (⟨ae, oe, au⟩). What happened to Vulgar Latin is set forth in the table.

Essentially, the ten pure vowels were reduced at first to nine vowels /a ɛ e i ɪ ɔ o u ʊ/ in Proto-Romance. Then Italo-Western Romance shifted /ɪ ʊ/ to /e o/, yielding seven vowels /a ɛ e i ɔ o u/, and vowel length was no longer a distinguishing feature. The diphthongs ⟨ae⟩ and ⟨oe⟩ fell in with /ɛ/ and /e/, respectively. ⟨au⟩ was retained, but various languages (including Old French) eventually turned it into /ɔ/ after the original /ɔ/ fell victim to further changes.

Development of French pronunciation over time
| Form ("to sing") | Latin | Vulgar Latin^{1} | Old French | | Modern French | |
| Form ("to sing") | Latin | Vulgar Latin^{1} | spelling | pronunciation | spelling | pronunciation |
|---|---|---|---|---|---|---|
| Infinitive | cantāre | */kanˈtaːre/ | chanter | /tʃanˈtæɾ/ | chanter | /ʃɑ̃ˈte/ |
| Past Part. | cantātum | */kanˈtaːtu/ | chanté(ṭ) | /tʃanˈtæ(θ)/ | chanté | /ʃɑ̃ˈte/ |
| Gerund | cantandum | */kanˈtandu/ | chantant | /tʃanˈtant/ | chantant | /ʃɑ̃ˈtɑ̃/ |
| 1sg. indic. | cantō | */ˈkanto/ | chant | /tʃant/ | chante | /ʃɑ̃t(ə)/ |
| 2sg. indic. | cantās | */ˈkantas/ | chantes | /ˈtʃantəs/ | chantes | /ʃɑ̃t(ə)/ |
| 3sg. indic. | cantat | */ˈkantat/ | chante(ṭ) | /ˈtʃantə(θ)/ | chante | /ʃɑ̃t(ə)/ |
| 1pl. indic.^{2} | cantāmus | */kanˈtaːmos/ | chantons | /tʃanˈtuns/ | chantons | /ʃɑ̃ˈtɔ̃/ |
| 2pl. indic. | cantātis | */kanˈtaːtes/ | chantez | /tʃanˈtæts/ | chantez | /ʃɑ̃ˈte/ |
| 3pl. indic. | cantant | */ˈkantant/ | chantent | /ˈtʃantə(n)t/ | chantent | /ʃɑ̃t(ə)/ |
| 1sg. subj. | cantem | */ˈkante/ | chant | /tʃant/ | chante | /ʃɑ̃t(ə)/ |
| 2sg. subj. | cantēs | */ˈkantes/ | chanz | /tʃants/ | chantes | /ʃɑ̃t(ə)/ |
| 3sg. subj. | cantet | */ˈkantet/ | chant | /tʃant/ | chante | /ʃɑ̃t(ə)/ |
| 1pl. subj.^{2} | cantēmus | */kanˈteːmos/ | chantons | /tʃanˈtuns/ | chantions | /ʃɑ̃ˈtjɔ̃/ |
| 2pl. subj. | cantētis | */kanˈteːtes/ | chantez | /tʃanˈtæts/ | chantiez | /ʃɑ̃ˈtje/ |
| 3pl. subj. | cantent | */ˈkantent/ | chantent | /ˈtʃantə(n)t/ | chantent | /ʃɑ̃t(ə)/ |
| 2sg. impv. | cantā | */ˈkanta/ | chante | /ˈtʃantə/ | chante | /ʃɑ̃t(ə)/ |
| 2pl. impv.^{3} | cantāte | */kanˈtaːte/ | chantez | /tʃanˈtæts/ | chantez | /ʃɑ̃ˈte/ |

1. The Vulgar Latin pronunciation reconstructions reflect Italo-Western Romance verb forms.
2. French first-person plural forms (with the exception of past historic) are not necessarily inherited from Latin, instead they are probably borrowed from Frankish suffix *-ōmês, instead of yielding *chantens.
3. The French second-person plural imperative is not inherited from the Latin form with the same function, instead it is supplied by either second-person plural indicative or subjunctive present; compare chante — chantez, but aie — ayez (subjunctive present of avoir), note vouille – vouillez (alternative imperative forms of vouloir); as they have ⟨-ez⟩ instead of the expected *chanté (this form would be the past participle).

The complex but regular French sound changes have caused irregularities in the conjugation of Old French verbs, like stressed stems caused by historic diphthongization (amer, aim, aimes, aime, aiment, but amons, amez), or regular loss of certain phonemes (vivre, vif, vis, vit). Later in Modern French, these changes were limited to fewer irregular verbs. Modern French also had lost the class of rather unpredictable -ier verbs (resulting from ejection of /j/ into the infinitive suffix -āre, which still exists in some langues d'oïl), having been replaced by simple -er verbs plus ⟨-i⟩ instead, as in manier, but Old French laissier → laisser.

Vowel length became automatically determined by syllable structure, with stressed open syllables having long vowels and other syllables having short vowels. Furthermore, the stress on accented syllables became more pronounced in Vulgar Latin than in Classical Latin. That tended to cause unaccented syllables to become less distinct, while working further changes on the sounds of the accented syllables. That especially applied to the new long vowels, many of which broke into diphthongs but with different results in each daughter language.

Old French underwent more thorough alterations of its sound system than did the other Romance languages. Vowel breaking is observed to some extent in Spanish and Italian: Vulgar Latin focu(s) "fire" (in Classical Latin, "hearth") becomes Italian fuoco and Spanish fuego. In Old French, it went even further than in any other Romance language; of the seven vowels inherited from Vulgar Latin, only /i/ remained unchanged in stressed open syllables:

- The sound of Latin short e, turning to /ɛ/ in Proto-Romance, became ⟨ie⟩ in Old French: Latin mel, "honey" > OF miel
- The sound of Latin short o > Proto-Romance /ɔ/ > OF ⟨uo⟩, later ⟨ue⟩: cor > cuor > cuer, "heart"
- Latin long ē and short i > Proto-Romance /e/ > OF ei: habēre > aveir, "to have"; this later becomes /oi/ in many words, as in avoir
- Latin long ō and short u > Proto-Romance /o/ > OF ou, later eu: flōrem > flour > fleur, "flower"
- Latin a, ā > Proto-Romance /a/ > OF /e/, probably through an intervening stage of /æ/; mare > mer, "sea". That change also characterizes the Gallo-Italic languages of Northern Italy (cf. Bolognese [mɛːr]).

Furthermore, all instances of Latin long ū > Proto-Romance /u/ became /y/, the lip-rounded sound that is written ⟨u⟩ in Modern French. That occurred in both stressed and unstressed syllables, regardless of whether open or closed.

Latin ⟨au⟩ did not share the fate of /ɔ/ or /o/; Latin aurum > OF or, "gold": not *œur nor *our. Latin ⟨au⟩ must have been retained at the time such changes were affecting Proto-Romance.

Changes affecting consonants were also quite pervasive in Old French. Old French shared with the rest of the Vulgar Latin world the loss of final ⟨-M⟩. Old French also dropped many internal consonants when they followed the strongly stressed syllable; Latin petram > Proto-Romance */ˈpɛtra/ > OF pierre; cf. Spanish piedra ("stone").

Table of Old French outcomes of Latin vowels
| Letter | Classical Latin | Vulgar Latin | Proto- Western Romance | Early Old French (through early 12th c.) | | Later Old French (from late 12th c.) | |
| Letter | Classical Latin | Vulgar Latin | Proto- Western Romance | closed | open | closed | open |
|---|---|---|---|---|---|---|---|
| a | /a/ | /a/ | | ⟨a⟩ /a/ | ⟨e, ie⟩ /æ, ie/ | ⟨a⟩ /a/ | ⟨e, ie⟩ /ɛ, jɛ/ |
| ā | /aː/ | /a/ | | ⟨a⟩ /a/ | ⟨e, ie⟩ /æ, ie/ | ⟨a⟩ /a/ | ⟨e, ie⟩ /ɛ, jɛ/ |
| ae | /a͡e̞/ | /ɛ/ | | ⟨e⟩ /ɛ/ | ⟨ie⟩ /ie/ | ⟨e⟩ /ɛ/ | ⟨ie⟩ /jɛ/ |
| e | /e̞/ | /ɛ/ | | ⟨e⟩ /ɛ/ | ⟨ie⟩ /ie/ | ⟨e⟩ /ɛ/ | ⟨ie⟩ /jɛ/ |
| oe | /o͡e̞/ | /e/ | /e/ | ⟨e⟩ /e/ | ⟨ei⟩ /ei/ | ⟨e⟩ /ɛ/ | ⟨oi⟩ /oi/ > /wɛ/ |
| ē | /e̞ː/ | /e/ | /e/ | ⟨e⟩ /e/ | ⟨ei⟩ /ei/ | ⟨e⟩ /ɛ/ | ⟨oi⟩ /oi/ > /wɛ/ |
| i | /i/ | /ɪ/ | /e/ | ⟨e⟩ /e/ | ⟨ei⟩ /ei/ | ⟨e⟩ /ɛ/ | ⟨oi⟩ /oi/ > /wɛ/ |
| ī | /iː/ | /i/ | | ⟨i⟩ /i/ | | | |
| au | /a͡u/ | /aw/ | | ⟨o⟩ /ɔ/ | | | |
| o | /o̞/ | /ɔ/ | | ⟨o⟩ /ɔ/ | ⟨uo⟩ /uo/ | ⟨o⟩ /ɔ/ | ⟨ue⟩ /wɛ/ > /ø/ |
| ō | /o̞ː/ | /o/ | /o/ | ⟨o⟩ /o/ | ⟨ou⟩ /ou/ | ⟨o(u)⟩ /u/ | ⟨eu⟩ /eu/ > /ø/ |
| u | /u/ | /ʊ/ | /o/ | ⟨o⟩ /o/ | ⟨ou⟩ /ou/ | ⟨o(u)⟩ /u/ | ⟨eu⟩ /eu/ > /ø/ |
| ū | /uː/ | /u/ | | ⟨u⟩ /y/ | | | |

During the early Old French period, the digraph ⟨oi⟩ was pronounced as a falling diphthong /oi̯/. It later shifted to become a rising diphthong /o̯e/. Most of the surviving Oïl languages maintain a pronunciation as /we/, but Literary French adopted a dialectal pronunciation, /wa/. The doublet of français and François in modern French orthography demonstrates the mix of dialectal features.

In some contexts, /oi/ became /e/, still written ⟨oi⟩ in Modern French.

At some point during the Old French period, vowels with a following nasal consonant began to be nasalized. While the process of losing the final nasal consonant took place after the Old French period, the nasal vowels that characterize Modern French appeared during the period in question.

== Table of vowel outcomes ==
The following table shows the most important modern outcomes of Vulgar Latin vowels, starting from the seven-vowel system of Proto-Western Romance stressed syllables: /a/, /ɛ/, /e/, /i/, /ɔ/, /o/, /u/. The vowels developed differently in different contexts, with the most important contexts being:

- "Open" syllables (followed by at most one consonant), where most of the vowels were diphthongized or otherwise modified.
- Syllables followed by a palatal consonant. An /i/ usually appeared before the palatal consonant, producing a diphthong, which subsequently evolved in complex ways. There were various palatal sources: Classical Latin /jj/ (e.g. peior "worse"); any consonant followed by a /j/ coming from Latin short /e/ or /i/ in hiatus (e.g. balneum "bath", palātium "palace"); /k/ or /ɡ/ followed by /e/ or /i/ (e.g. pācem "peace", cōgitō "I think"); /k/ or /ɡ/ followed by /a/ and preceded by /a/, /e/ or /i/ (e.g. plāga "wound"); /k/ or /ɡ/ after a vowel in various sequences, such as /kl/, /kr/, /ks/, /kt/, /ɡl/, /ɡn/, /ɡr/ (e.g. noctem "night", veclum < vetulum "old", nigrum "black").
- Syllables preceded by a palatal consonant. An /i/ appeared after the palatal consonant, producing a rising diphthong. The palatal consonant could arise in any of the ways just described. In addition, it could stem from an earlier /j/ brought into contact with a following consonant by loss of the intervening vowel: e.g. medietātem > Proto-Romance /mejjeˈtate/ > Gallo-Romance /mejˈtat/ (loss of unstressed vowels) > Proto-French /meiˈtʲat/ (palatalization) > Old French /moiˈtjɛ/ > moitié /mwaˈtje/ "half".
- Nasal syllables (followed by an /n/ or /m/), where nasal vowels arose. Nasal syllables inhibited many of the changes that otherwise happened in open syllables; instead, vowels tended to be raised. Subsequently, the following /n/ or /m/ was deleted unless a vowel followed, and the nasal vowels were lowered; but when the /n/ or /m/ remained, the nasal quality was lost, with no lowering of the vowel. This produced significant alternations, such as masculine fin /fɛ̃/ vs. feminine fine /fin/.
- Syllables closed by /s/ followed by another consonant. By Old French times, this /s/ was "debuccalized" into /h/, which was subsequently lost, with a phonemic long vowel taking its place. These long vowels remained for centuries, and continued to be indicated by an ⟨s⟩, and later a circumflex, with alternations such as bette /bɛt/ "chard" vs. bête (formerly /bɛːt/) "beast" (borrowed from bēstiam). Sometimes the length difference was accompanied by a difference in vowel quality, e.g. mal /mal/ "bad" vs. mâle /mɑːl/ "male" (Latin māsculum < */ˈmaslə/). Phonemic length disappeared from Parisian French by the 18th century, but survived regionally (now especially in Belgian French).
- Syllables closed by /l/ followed by another consonant (although the sequence -lla- was not affected). The /l/ vocalized to /w/, producing a diphthong, which then developed in various ways.
- Syllables where two or more of the above conditions occurred simultaneously, which generally evolved in complex ways. Common examples are syllables followed by both a nasal and a palatal element (e.g. from Latin -neu-, -nea-, -nct-); open syllables preceded by a palatal (e.g. cēram "wax"); syllables both preceded and followed by a palatal (e.g. iacet "it lies"); syllables preceded by a palatal and followed by a nasal (e.g. canem "dog").

The developments in unstressed syllables were both simpler and less predictable. In Proto-Western Romance, there were only five vowels in unstressed syllables: /a/, /e/, /i/, /o/, /u/, as low-mid vowels /ɛ/, /ɔ/ were raised to /e/, /o/. These syllables were not subject to diphthongization and many of the other complex changes that affected stressed syllables. This produced many lexical and grammatical alternations between stressed and unstressed syllables. However, there was a strong tendency (especially beginning in the Middle French period, when the formerly strong stress accent was drastically weakened) to even out these alternations. In certain cases in verbal paradigms an unstressed variant was imported into stressed syllables, but mostly it was the other way around, with the result that in Modern French all of the numerous vowels can appear in unstressed syllables.

Table of modern outcomes of Vulgar Latin vowel combinations
| Gallo-Romance | Context ^{1} | Proto-French | Later Old French | Modern French | Written | Example |
Vowels not followed by /s/, /n/, /l/, /ɲ/
| /a/ | closed | /a/ | | | a | partem > part /paʁ/ "part" |
| /a/ | open | /æ/ | /ɛ/ | /ɛ/; /e/+#^{1} | e; é | mare > mer /mɛʁ/ "sea", amātum > /aiˈmɛθ/ > aimé /eˈme/ "loved" |
| /a/ | before Gallo-Romance /u, o/ or /w/ | /ɔ/ | /ɔ/, combines with next element (/w, u, o, ɣu, ɣo/) to make a new diphthong, /ɔw/ | /u/ | ou | fagvm > Gallo-Romance /faɣo/ > Old French fou /fɔw/ + diminutive -et > fouet /fwɛ/ "beech tree"; bavan (< Gaulish) > /bɔwə/ > boue /bu/ "mud" |
| /a/ | palatal + open | /iæ/ | /jɛ/ | /jɛ/; /je/+#^{1} | ie; ié | medietātem > Vulgar Latin /mejeˈtate/ > /mejˈtʲate/ > Early Old French /meiˈtiɛθ/^{3} > Late Old French /moiˈtjɛ/ > moitié /mwaˈtje/ "half"; cārum > Old French chier /tʃjɛr/ > cher /ʃɛʁ/ "dear" |
| /ɛ/ | closed | /ɛ/ | | | e | septem > sept /sɛt/ "seven" |
| /ɛ/ | open | /iɛ/ | /jɛ/ | /jɛ/; /je/+#^{1} | ie | heri > hier /jɛʁ/ "yesterday"; pedem > pied /pje/ "foot" |
| /e/ | closed | /e/ | /ɛ/ | | e | siccvm > sec /sɛk/ "dry" |
| /e/ | open | /ei/ | /oi/ > /wɛ/ | /wa/ | oi | pēram > poire /pwaʁ/; vidēre > early Old French vedeir /vəˈðeir/ > Old French vëoir /vəˈoir/ > voir /vwaʁ/ "to see" |
| /e/ | palatal + open | /iei/ | /i/ | | i | cēram > cire /siʁ/ "wax"; mercēdem > merci /mɛʁˈsi/ "mercy" |
| /i/ | all | /i/ | /i/ | | i | vītam > vie /vi/ "life"; vīllam > ville > /vil/ "town" |
| /ɔ/ | closed | /ɔ/ | | /ɔ/; /o/+#^{1} | o | portam > porte /pɔʁt/ "door"; *sottum, *sottam > sot, sotte /so/, /sɔt/ "silly" |
| /ɔ/ | open | /uɔ/ | /wɛ/ | /œ/, /ø/ ^{2} | eu \ œu | novum > neuf /nœf/ "new"; cor > *corem > cœur /kœʁ/ "heart" |
| /o/ | closed | /o/ | /u/ | | ou | subtus > /ˈsottos/ > sous /su/ "under"; surdum > sourd /suʁ/ "deaf" |
| /o/ | open | /ou/ | /eu/ | /œ/, /ø/ ^{2} | eu \ œu | nōdvm > nœud /nø/ "knot" |
| /u/ | all | /y/ | | | u | dv̄rvm > dur /dyʁ/ "hard"; nūllam > nulle /nyl/ "none (fem.)" |
| /au/ | all | /au/ | /ɔ/ | /ɔ/; /o/+#^{1} | o \ au | aurum > or /ɔʁ/ "gold" |
| /au/ | followed by /z/ | /au/ | /oː/ | /o/ | o \ au | cavsam > chose /ʃoz/ "thing" |
| /au/ | followed by Gallo-Romance /w/, /ɣu/, /ɣo/ | /ɔ/ | combining with second element to make /ɔw/ | /u/ | ou | *traucon (< Gaulish) > Gallo-Romance /trauɣo/ > Old French /trɔw/ > trou /tʁu/ "hole" |
Vowels + /n/ or /m/
| /an/ | closed | /an/ | /ã/ | /ɑ̃/ [ɒ̃] | an | annvm > an /ɑ̃/ "year"; cantum > chant /ʃɑ̃/ "song" |
| /an/ | open | /ain/ | /ɛ̃n/ | /ɛn/ | aine, aime | sānam > saine /sɛn/ "healthy (fem.)"; amat > aime /ɛm/ "(he) loves" |
| /an/ | late closed | /ain/ | /ɛ̃/ | /ɛ̃/ [æ̃] | ain, aim | sānvm > sain /sɛ̃/ "healthy (masc.)"; famem > faim /fɛ̃/ "hunger" |
| /an/ | palatal + late closed | /iain/ > /iɛn/ | /jɛ̃/ | /jɛ̃/ [jæ̃] | ien | canem > chien /ʃjɛ̃/ "dog" |
| /ɛn/ | closed | /en/ | /ã/ | /ɑ̃/ [ɒ̃] | en | dentem > dent /dɑ̃/ "teeth" |
| /ɛn/ | open | /ien/ | /jɛ̃n/ | /jɛn/ | ienn(e) | tenent > tiennent /tjɛn/ "(they) hold" |
| /ɛn/ | late closed | /ien/ | /jɛ̃/ | /jɛ̃/ [jæ̃] | ien | bene > bien /bjɛ̃/ "well"; tenet > tient /tjɛ̃/ "(he) holds" |
| /en/ | closed | /en/ | /ã/ | /ɑ̃/ [ɒ̃] | an \ en | lingua > langue /lɑ̃ɡ/ "tongue" |
| /en/ | open | /ein/ | /ẽn/ | /ɛn/ | eine | pēnam > peine /pɛn/ "sorrow, trouble" |
| /en/ | late closed | /ein/ | /ẽ/ | /ɛ̃/ [æ̃] | ein | plēnvm > plein /plɛ̃/ "full"; sinum > sein /sɛ̃/ "breast" |
| /en/ | palatal + late closed | /iein/ > /in/ | /ĩ/ | /ɛ̃/ [æ̃] | in | racēmvm > raisin /rɛzɛ̃/ "grape" |
| /in/ | closed, late closed | /in/ | /ĩ/ | /ɛ̃/ [æ̃] | in | quīnque > *cīnque > cinq /sɛ̃k/ "five"; fīnvm > fin /fɛ̃/ "fine, thin (masc.)" |
| /in/ | open | /in/ | /ĩn/ | /in/ | ine | fīnam > fine /fin/ "fine, thin (fem.)" |
| /ɔn/ | closed | /on/ | /ũ/ | /ɔ̃/ [õ] | on | pontem > pont /pɔ̃/ "bridge" |
| /ɔn/ | open | /on/, /uon/ | /ũn/, /wɛ̃n/ | /ɔn/ | onn(e) | bonam > bonne /bɔn/ "good (fem.)" |
| /ɔn/ | late closed | /on/, /uon/ | /ũ/, /wɛ̃/ | /ɔ̃/ [õ] | on | bonum > OF buen > bon /bɔ̃/ "good (masc.)"; comes > OF cuens "count (noble rank) (nom.)" |
| /on/ | closed, late closed | /on/ | /ũ/ | /ɔ̃/ [õ] | on | dōnvm > don /dɔ̃/ "gift" |
| /on/ | open | /on/ | /ũn/ | /ɔn/ | onn(e) | dōnat > donne /dɔn/ "(he) gives" |
| /un/ | closed, late closed | /yn/ | /ỹ/ | /œ̃/ > /ɛ̃/ [æ̃] | un, um | v̄nvm > un /œ̃/ > /ɛ̃/ "one"; perfv̄mvm > parfum /paʁˈfœ̃/ > /paʁˈfɛ̃/ "perfume" |
| /un/ | open | /yn/ | /ỹn/ | /yn/ | une, ume | v̄nam > une /yn/ "one (fem.)"; plv̄mam > plume /plym/ "feather" |
Vowels + /s/ (followed by a consonant)
| /as/ | closed | /ah/ | /ɑː/ | /ɑ/ [a] | -as | bassum > bas /bɑ/ "low" |
| /ɛs/ | closed | /ɛh/ | /ɛː/ | /ɛ/ | ê | festam > fête /fɛt/ "feast" |
| /es/ | closed | /eh/ | /ɛː/ | /ɛ/ | ê | bēstiam > bête /bɛt/ "beast" |
| /is/ | closed | /ih/ | /iː/ | /i/ | î | abȳssimvm > *abīsmum > abîme /abim/ "chasm" |
| /ɔs/ | closed | /ɔh/ | /oː/ | /o/ | ô | costam > côte /kot/ "coast", grossum, grossam > gros, grosse /ɡʁo/, /ɡʁos/ "fat" |
| /os/ | closed | /oh/ | /uː/ | /u/ | oû | cōnstat > *cōstat > coûte /kut/ "(it) costs" |
| /us/ | closed | /yh/ | /yː/ | /y/ | û | fv̄stem > fût /fy/ "bole" |
Vowels + /l/ (followed by a consonant, but not /la/)
| /al/ | closed | /al/ | /au/ | /o/ | au | falsvm > faux /fo/ "false"; palmam > paume /pom/ "palm" |
| /ɛl/ | closed | /ɛl/ | /ɛau/ | /o/ | eau | bellvm > beau /bo/ (but bellam > belle /bɛl/) "beautiful" |
| /ɛl/ | late closed | /jɛl/ | /jɛu/ | /jœ/, /jø/ ^{2} | ieu | melivs > /miɛʎts/ > /mjɛus/ > mieux /mjø/ "better" |
| /el/ | closed | /el/ | /ɛu/ | /œ/, /ø/ ^{2} | eu | capillvm > cheveu /ʃəˈvø/ "hair"; *filtrvm > feutre /føtʁ/ "felt" |
| /il/ | closed, late closed | /il/ | /i/ | | -il | gentīlem > gentil /ʒɑ̃ˈti/ "nice" |
| /ɔl/ | closed | /ɔl/ | /ou/ | /u/ | ou | follem > fou (but *follam > folle /fɔl/) "crazy"; colaphum > *colpum > coup /ku/ "blow" |
| /ɔl/ | late closed | /wɔl/ | /wɛu/ | /œ/, /ø/, /jœ/, /jø/ ^{3} | eu, yeu | *volet > OF vueut > veut "(he) wants" /vø/; oculus > OF uelz > yeux "eyes" /jø/ |
| /ol/ | closed | /ol/ | /ou/ | /u/ | ou | pvlsat > pousse /pus/ "(he) pushes" |
| /ul/ | closed, late closed | /yl/ | /y/ | | -ul | cv̄lvm > cul /ky/ "buttocks" |
| /aul/ | closed, late closed | /awl/ | /ou/ | /u/ | ou | cavlis > chou /ʃu/ "cabbage" |
Vowels + /i/ (from a Gallo-Romance palatal element)
| /ai/ | all | /ai/ | /ɛ/ | | ai | factvm > /fait/ > fait /fɛ/ "deed"; palātivm > palais /paˈlɛ/ "palace"; plāgam > plaie /plɛ/ "wound"; placet > /plaist/ > plaît /plɛ/ "(he) pleases"; paria > paire /pɛʁ/ "pair" |
| /ai/ | palatal + | /iai/ > /i/ | /i/ | | i | iacet > OF gist > gît /ʒi/ "(he) lies (on the ground)"; cacat > chie /ʃi/ "(he) shits" |
| /ɛi/ | all | /iɛi/ | /i/ | | i | lectvm > /lɛit/ > lit /li/ "bed"; sex > six /sis/ "six"; peior > pire /piʁ/ "worse" |
| /ei/ | all | /ei/ | /oi/ > /wɛ/ | /wa/ | oi | tēctvm > /teit/ > toit /twa/ "roof"; rēgem > /rei/ > roi /ʁwa/ "king"; nigrvm > /neir/ > noir /nwaʁ/ "black"; fēriam > /ˈfeira/ > foire /fwaʁ/ "fair" |
| /ɔi/ | all | /uɔi/ | /yi/ | /ɥi/ | ui | noctem > /nɔit/ > nuit /nɥi/ "night"; hodiē > /ˈɔje/ > hui /ɥi/ "today"; coxa > /ˈkɔisə/ > cuisse /kɥis/ "thigh" |
| /oi/ | all | /oi/ | /oi/ > /wɛ/ | /wa/ | oi | bvxitam > /ˈboista/ > boîte /bwat/ "box"; crucem > croix /kʁwa/ "cross" |
| /ui/ | all | /yi/ | /yi/ | /ɥi/ | ui | frv̄ctvm > /fruit/ > fruit /fʁɥi/ "fruit" |
| /aui/ | all | /ɔi/ | /oi/ > /wɛ/ | /wa/ | oi | gavdia > /ˈdʒɔiə/ > joie /ʒwa/ "joy" |
Vowels plus /ɲ/ (from /n/ + a Gallo-Romance palatal element)
| /aɲ/ | closed, late closed | /aɲ/ > /ain/ | /ɛ̃/ | /ɛ̃/ [æ̃] | ain | ba(l)neum > /baɲ/ > /bain/ > bain /bɛ̃/ "bath"; > sanctvm > /saɲt/ > /saint/ > saint /sɛ̃/ "holy" |
| /aɲ/ | open | /aɲ/ | /ãɲ/ | /aɲ/ | agn | montāneam > /monˈtaɲ/ > montagne /mɔ̃ˈtaɲ/ "mountain" |
| /ɛɲ/ | unattested? | | | | | |
| /eɲ/ | closed, late closed | /eɲ/ > /ein/ | /ẽ/ | /ɛ̃/ [æ̃] | ein | pinctvm > /peɲt/ > /peint/ > peint /pɛ̃/ "painted" |
| /eɲ/ | open | /eɲ/ | /ẽɲ/ | /ɛɲ/ | eign | insigniam > enseigne /ɑ̃ˈsɛɲ/ "sign" |
| /iɲ/ | closed, late closed | unattested? | | | | |
| /iɲ/ | open | /iɲ/ | /ĩɲ/ | /iɲ/ | ign | līneam > ligne /liɲ/ "line" |
| /ɔɲ/ | closed, late closed | /oɲ/ > /oin/ | /wɛ̃/ | /wɛ̃/ [wæ̃] | oin | longe > /loɲ/? > /loin/ > loin /lwɛ̃/ "far" |
| /ɔɲ/ | open | /oɲ/ | /ũɲ/ | /ɔɲ/ | ogn | *frogna (Gaulish) > frogne /fʁɔɲ/ "frown" |
| /oɲ/ | closed, late closed | /oɲ/ > /oin/ | /wɛ̃/ | /wɛ̃/ [wæ̃] | oin | pvnctvm > /poɲt/ > /point/ > point /pwɛ̃/ "point"; cvnevm > /koɲ/ > /koin/ > coin /kwɛ̃/ "wedge" |
| /oɲ/ | open | /oɲ/ | /ũɲ/ | /ɔɲ/ | ogn | verecvndiam > vergogne /vɛʁˈɡɔɲ/ "shame" |
| /uɲ/ | closed, late closed | /yɲ/ > /yin/ | /ɥĩ/ | /ɥɛ̃/ [ɥæ̃] | uin | iv̄nivm > /dʒyɲ/ > /dʒyin/ > juin /ʒɥɛ̃/ "June" |
| /uɲ/ | open | unattested? | | | | |

^1 "Context" refers to the syllable context at the Vulgar Latin or Gallo-Romance stage. The contexts are as follows:

- An "open" context is a stressed syllable followed by at most a single consonant at the Vulgar Latin stage.
- A "closed" context is any other syllable type (unstressed, or followed by two or more consonants).
- A "late closed" context is a context that is open at the Vulgar Latin (Proto-Romance) stage but becomes closed in the Gallo-Romance stage due to loss an unstressed vowel (usually /e/ or /o/ in a final syllable).
- A "palatal" context is a stressed syllable where the preceding consonant has a palatal quality, causing a yod /j/ to be generated after the preceding consonant, before the stressed vowel.

Changes that occurred due to contexts that developed during the Old French stage or later are indicated in the "Modern French" column. In particular, "+#" indicates a word-final context in modern French, which generally evolved due to loss of a final consonant in Old French or Middle French. For example, loss of /θ/ in aimé "loved" (originally /aiˈmɛθ/) occurred in Old French, while loss of /t/ in sot "silly" occurred in Middle French (hence its continuing presence in spelling, which tends to reflect later Old French).

^2 Both /œ/ and /ø/ occur in modern French, and there are a small number of minimal pairs, e.g. jeune /ʒœn(ə)/ "young" vs. jeûne /ʒøn(ə)/ [ʒøːn(ə)] "fast (abstain from food)". In general, however, /ø/ only occurs word-finally, before /z/, and usually before /t/, while /œ/ occurs elsewhere.

^3 However, the sequences */ueu/ from multiple origins regularly dissimilate to /jɛw/ (and later /jœ/, /jø/) except after labials and velars (Latin locus → /lueu/ → lieu /ljø/, but *volet → [vuoɫt] → [vueɫt] → [vueut] → veut /vø/).

^4 The changes producing French moitié /mwaˈtje/ were approximately as follows:

1. medietātem (Classical Latin form)
2. [medjeˈtaːtẽː] (pronunciation c. 1st century BC)
3. [mejjeˈtaːtẽː] (1st century AD: [dj] > [jj])
4. [mɛjjɛˈtaːteː] (2nd century AD, loss of nasalization)
5. [mejˈtaːde] (c. 3rd–6th century AD: loss of vowel quantity, new lengthening under stress, raising of [ɛ] to [e] in unstressed syllables, loss of intertonic [e]; first lenition of intervocalic obstruents, causing voicing of the second [t]; the first [t] is preceded by the consonant [j] and so remains voiceless)
6. [mejˈtʲaːde] (c. 3rd–6th century AD: progressive palatalization in clusters of [j] + consonant)
7. [mei̯ˈtieðe] (5th–7th century AD: Bartsch's law, changing [aː] into [ie] after a palatal or palatalized consonant; second lenition of intervocalic stops, changing [d] into [ð] between vowels)
8. [mei̯ˈtieð] (7th century AD: loss of final unstressed [e])
9. [mei̯ˈtieθ] (7th century AD: final devoicing)
10. [mei̯ˈtieθ] (9th century AD, Early Old French)
11. [mei̯ˈtie] (12th century AD: loss of dental fricatives)
12. [moi̯ˈtie] (12th century AD, Later Old French: dissimilation of the diphthong [ei̯] to [oi̯])
13. [mweˈtje] (12th-13th century AD, Late Old French: replacement of falling diphthongs with rising diphthongs)
14. [mwɛˈtje] (13th century AD)
15. [mwaˈtje] (18th century AD, Classical French and Modern French) ⟨moitié⟩

== Chronological history ==
=== To Proto-Romance ===
- Loss of /h/.
- Loss of final /m/ (except in monosyllables: Modern French rien < rem).
- /ns/ > /s/. The preceding vowel was long as a result of compensatory lengthening (already in Classical Latin).
- /rs/ > /ss/ in some words (dorsum > Vulgar Latin *dossu > Modern French dos) but not others (ursum > Modern French ours).
- Fusion of the diphthongs ae and oe to /ɛ(ː)/ and /e(ː)/ respectively (it is disputed whether the fusion of ae initially produced a short or long vowel, or postdated the neutralization of Latin vowel length). The diphthong /au/ was retained.
- Development of Latin /w/ and intervocalic /b/ to a voiced labial fricative. The original phonetic realization of this sound was probably bilabial [β] (found today in Spanish as an allophone of /b/), but it eventually became labiodental [v] in French, and so will be transcribed /v/ below.
- Introduction of prosthetic short /i/ before words beginning with /s/ + consonant, which would later become closed /e/ with the Italo-Western vowel change (Spanish espina, Modern French épine "thorn, spine" < espine < spīnam).
- Vulgar Latin unstressed vowel loss: Loss of intertonic (unstressed and in an interior syllable) vowels between /k/, /ɡ/ and /r/, /l/.
- Final /-er/ > /-re/, /-or/ > /-ro/ (Spanish cuatro, sobre < quattuor, super).
- Reduction of /e/ and /i/ in hiatus to /j/, which would eventually be followed by palatalization of the resulting consonant + /j/ sequences.
- Affrication of /tj/ (2nd–3rd centuries AD).
- Gemination of /kj/ to /kkj/.

=== To Proto-Italo-Western Romance ===
The following sound changes are shared among Italo-Western Romance languages, but must be dated later than Proto-Romance in the strict sense (assuming a tree model of descent), because they are absent from some dialects of Sardinian. (The merger of Latin /u oː/ to /o/ is also generally absent from Eastern/Balkan Romance.)

- Reduction of ten-vowel system to the seven vowels /a ɛ e i ɔ o u/ (see table). In unstressed syllables, /ɛ ɔ/ become /e o/, resulting in only five distinct unstressed vowels.
- Palatalization of /k/, /ɡ/ before the front vowels /ɛ e i/ (around the fifth century AD). For simplicity, the outcomes can be transcribed as /kʲ/, /ɡʲ/; the steps involved in their subsequent phonetic development are debated.

=== To Old Gallo-Romance, c. 600 ===
- Further changes involving palatalized sounds:
  - /kʲ/ and /tj/ merge as an affricate /tsʲ/ (treated as a single sound). The double version of this affricate, /ttsʲ/, is the regular outcome of /kkj/, from earlier /kj/, from unstressed Latin /ki/ or /ke/ + vowel.
  - /j/, /dj/, /ɡj/, /ɡʲ/ have all merged as /j/ by this point. (A merge of some or all of these sounds is also widely seen in other Romance languages, but some languages show divergent developments in at least some words, particularly for /dj/.)
  - /ɡn/ and /nj/ become /ɲ/.
  - /ɡl/ and /kl/ become /ʎ/. The intermediate steps are disputed.
  - /kt/ > /jt/ and /ks/ > /js/; first going through /xt/ and /xs/, respectively.
- First lenition (did not happen in a small area around the Pyrenees): chain shift involving intervocalic singleton consonants. Voiced stops and unvoiced fricatives become voiced fricatives, while unvoiced stops become voiced stops. Specifically, intervocalic /d ɡ/ > [ð ɣ] (Latin intervocalic /b/ had already become /v/); intervocalic /s f/ > [z v], and intervocalic /p t k tsʲ/ > /b d ɡ dzʲ/. The dating is debated; it is sometimes placed as early as the 3rd century AD, but was probably not completed until later; it seems to have been complete in Gaul by the end of the sixth century. Consonants before /r/ are lenited, also, and /pl/ > /bl/. Final /t/ and /d/ are lenited when preceded by a vowel.
  - *malefatius > Early Old French [maɫvais].
- First unstressed vowel loss: Loss of intertonic (unstressed and in an interior syllable) vowels except /a/ when pretonic. That occurred at the same time as the first lenition, and individual words inconsistently show one change before the other. Hence manica > manche but grānica > grange. carricāre becomes either charchier or chargier in Old French. However, in some analyses, the standard for central French was initially for lenition to occur before the unstressed vowel loss, and patterns of the order being reversed, resulting in voiceless consonants, were loaned from the more Frankish-influenced Northern dialects of Normandy, Champagne and Lorrain, eventually spreading to some other words by analogy, leading to known cases of divergent development, such as grange and granche, and venger and (re)vencher (the latter both from Latin vindicāre).
- Vowels /e/ and /o/ are raised to /i/ and /u/, when preceding a syllable containing /i/ or /j/: illī > il, mōvī > mui, dēbuī > /ˈdiwwi/ > dui /ˈdyj/ (see also metaphony). The traces of this process were later deleted in the nominative plurals, due to analogy.

=== To Early Old French, c. 840 ===
Evidence of 9th century French phonology is relatively limited, being based largely on two short documents, the Oaths of Strasbourg, written in 842 in what was likely a deliberately Latinized, archaic form of Romance, and the Sequence of Saint Eulalia, written around 880 in some Romance vernacular of north central France, not directly ancestral to modern French (the modern French form chose requires palatalization of /ka/ to have taken place before monophthongization of [au̯], whereas the Sequence's "cose" shows only the latter of these two sound changes, as in modern Picard). Nevertheless, the following sound changes may be identified as having taken place before or around this period:

- Diphthongization of open-mid vowels /ɛ, ɔ/ in stressed open syllables (where the vowels had likely been allophonically lengthened to [ɛː, ɔː]), and also in stressed closed syllables if followed by a palatal sound (often later absorbed). They remain unchanged in other kinds of closed syllables, hence semper > sempre [ˈsɛmprə] (Eulalia line 10) and mort(u)a > morte [ˈmɔrtə] (Eulalia line 18). Unstressed /ɛ, ɔ/ did not exist, having merged with /e, o/. The diphthongs resulting from this sound change are variously transcribed by modern linguists as [iɛ, uɔ] or [jɛ, wɔ]. Old French assonances and rhymes suggest that diphthongization initially produces falling diphthongs such as [ie̯, uo̯] or [iɛ̯, uɔ̯], with [ie̯] later evolving into a rising diphthong ([jɛ, je]) and [uo̯] later evolving into a front rounded vowel [œ, ø] (possibly with [ue̯] or [wɛ, we] as intermediate steps). However, Porter 1960 reconstructs the rising diphthongs [jɛ, wɔ] as occurring already in Eulalia.
  - In stressed open syllables: Latin bona, caelum > Early Old French buona, ciel (Eulalia lines 1, 6)
  - Followed by a palatal in stressed closed syllables: peior >> /ˈpɛjro/ > /ˈpiejro/ >> pire "worst"; noctem > /ˈnɔjte/ > /ˈnuojte/ >> /nujt/ nuit; but tertium > /ˈtɛrtsʲo/ >> tierz.
  - Diphthongization in the contexts described above predates the earliest Old French texts, but the exact date of this sound change for northern Gallo-Romance languages is uncertain. Although diphthongization of /ɛ, ɔ/ is a widespread sound change in Romance languages (suggesting it arose relatively early, possibly within a shared community of Late Latin speakers) the conditions in which it occurs are not uniform between languages: for example, /ɛ, ɔ/ diphthongize in both closed and open stressed syllables in Romanian and Spanish, and nowhere in Portuguese. Some linguists date diphthongization to the 6th or 7th century, while others argue it occurred as early as the 3rd or 4th century; Loporcaro (2015) argues the early dating has not been established. Diphthongization affects the vowels in some loanwords from Germanic, such as Germanic *medu > Old French mied, mies "mead".
- Second lenition of intervocalic voiced stops (not in all Gallo-Romance):
  - Between vowels, singleton [b d ɡ] (from Latin [p t k]) become [v ð ɣ]. As before, intervocalic [br dr ɡr] are also affected: patrem, capra, sacrāmentum > [ˈpaːdre, ˈkaːbra, saɡraˈmento] > EOF [ˈpæðrə, ˈtʃie̯vrə, saɣraˈment] > French père, chèvre, serment. Cf. soure [sovrə] 'over' (Eulalia, line 12). The labialized velar [ɡʷ] (from Latin [kʷ] between vowels) becomes [jw] after stressed front vowels, as in sequit > *[ˈsiejwet] > siut, or with metathesis, suit. This can be strengthened to [i̯v] when followed by a vowel or by [r], as in sequere > *[ˈsiejwrə] > sivre~siure [ˈsivrə]~[ˈsiwrə]. Northern and eastern dialects show [w] rather than [jw] in this context, hence sequere, sequit > seure~sieure, seut~sieut.
  - This lenition does not affect [d] that had come into contact with a preceding consonant via intertonic vowel loss, even in cases where that preceding consonant eventually becomes lost or vocalized, as in adcubitāre > French accouder, *subitānum > French soudain, *placitāre > French plaider, adjūtāre > French aider. (Pope 1952 interprets forms such as OF aidier, sodain, bondir as showing voicing of [t] to [d] by progressive assimilation after [j, β, b].)
    - In contrast, the glide that develops from diphthongization of [eː] (see below) does not protect a following consonant, as seen in monēta > [moˈneːda] > [moˈnei̯ðə] > Old French moneie, monoie.
- Palatalization of velars before /a/:
  - [k, ɡ] before /a/ become palatal affricates [tʃ, dʒ] (late fifth to early sixth century). Very few words fail to palatalize: cavea >> cage, not **chage.
  - [ɣ] before /a/ becomes a palatal glide [i̯] when preceded by an unrounded vowel.
    - [ɣ] also becomes a palatal glide [i̯] in the suffixes -īcum and -(i)ācum (amīcum > ami, Tornācum > Tournai, but not in the words caecum > cieu and graecum > grieu).
- [pʲ] and [fʲ] become [tʃ]; [bʲ] and [vʲ] become [dʒ]; [mʲ] becomes [ndʒ]. This development was also seen in Occitan and Ligurian.
- When not preceded by a vowel, /j/ becomes [dʒ]. The ultimate source can be Late Latin /dj/, /ɡj/, /ɡ(e, i)/, or word-initial /j/:
  - diurnum > EOF jorn [dʒurn], Georgius > OF Georges, argentum > OF argent [arˈdʒent], iacet > OF gist [dʒist].
- Where intertonic vowel loss had brought [j] into contact with following [d r t n], it palatalized them to [dʲ rʲ tʲ nʲ] (as indicated by the development of a following /a/ in a stressed originally open syllable). The preceding vowel develops to a diphthong ending in the glide [i̯]. Examples:
  - impeiorāre > [empejˈraːre] > [empei̯ˈrʲaːre] > [empei̯ˈrie̯r] > OF empoirier "to worsen" (compare peior > [ˈpɛjro] > [ˈpie̯i̯rʲe] > pire)
  - medietātem > [mejeˈtaːte] > [mejˈtaːde] > [mei̯ˈtʲaːðe] > [mei̯ˈtie̯θ] > moitié
- The glide [i̯] develops between a vowel and a following palatalized consonant in some cases:
  - Before double [ssʲ] (from /ssj/, /stj/, /skj/, or /sk(e,i)/). This will ultimately develop to [i̯s] (spelled "iss"), merging with original /ks/.
    - messiōnem > meisson, pisciōnem > peisson, nāscentem > naissant
  - Before single [zʲ] or [dzʲ] (from intervocalic /sj/, /tj/, /k(e,i)/). This will ultimately develop to [i̯z] (spelled "is").
    - mānsiōnem > maison, ratiōnem > raison, placēre > plaisir
  - Before [rʲ] (which ultimately develops to [i̯r], spelled "ir") and also before certain clusters ending in [rʲ]:
    - corium > cuir, ostrea > uistre
  - Before syllable-final [ɲ]. This will ultimately develop to [i̯n] (spelled "in"): ivngit > */ˈjonjet/ > [dʒoɲt] > [dʒoi̯nt] joint
- But a glide typically does not develop between a vowel and the following consonants:
  - [tʃ], [dʒ] (which are possibly double [ttʃ], [ddʒ] in intervocalic position)
  - [tsʲ] (which is possibly double [ttsʲ] in intervocalic position)
    - faciat > [ˈfattsʲat] > OF face. (This word occurs in the Oaths of Strasbourg with the spelling ⟨fazet⟩, which is transcribed as [fatsət] by Rickard (2003:22) and Alkire & Rosen (2010:325).)
  - double [ddz(ʲ)], which develops to Old French [dz] (as in OF doze, treze, seze, from [doddze], [treddze], [seddze])
  - [ʎ] (although in writing [ʎ] was represented by "il" or "ill").
- Morphemic [-arʲ-] in inherited words becomes [-ie̯r-] instead of [-ai̯r-], hence operārium > [obˈraːrʲo] > [obˈrie̯ro] (not *[obˈrai̯ro]) >> ouvrier "worker", but ārea >> aire "area" did not participate.
- Diphthongization of /e, o/ and fronting of /a/ in stressed, originally open syllables. In other words, these changes affect long [aː, eː, oː], which were either allophones of /a, e, o/ (if it is assumed that diphthongization preceded degemination and final vowel apocope) or distinct phonemes (if degemination and final vowel apocope preceded diphthongization). There is disagreement about the relative ordering of these sound changes. Diphthongization does not affect vowels followed by a palatal glide or palatalized sound. This diphthongization has been dated to the fourth century, seventh century, or mid-eighth century; it did not occur in all Gallo-Romance.
  - [oː] becomes [ou̯], as in *bellātiōrem > bellezour (Eulalia line 2).
  - [eː] becomes [ei̯] when not preceded by a palatal sound, as in concrēdere > concreidre (Eulalia line 21).
    - After a palatal or palatalized consonant, [eː] evolves instead to /i/ (likely via simplification of [ie̯i̯]; see below). Examples: cēra > OF cire, pagēnsem > OF païs, placēre > OF plaisir, iacēre > OF gesir
  - [aː], when not followed by a nasal or preceded by a palatal sound, becomes a vowel that can be transcribed as /æ/. Its actual phonetic quality is debated: in Early Old French, it is usually written ⟨e⟩ but does not assonate with either /ɛ/ or /e/. It evolves later in French to [ɛ] in a closed syllable, [e] in an open one. A diphthong such as [aɛ̯] may have been a stage in its development, but alternatively it may have simply developed by fronting of [aː] to [æː], resulting in a phonemic distinction between the four vowel qualities /a/, /æ/, /ɛ/ and /e/. Another common interpretation supposes that [aː] evolved to /eː/ or /ɛː/, a distinctively long vowel in contrast to short /ɛ/ and /e/, although this would be the only phonemic length contrast in the Early Old French vowel system.
    - Before a nasal, [aː] evolves instead to /ai̯/ when not preceded by a palatalized consonant: manum, amat > OF main, aime
    - After a palatalized consonant (including the affricates [tʃ, dʒ, tsʲ] as well as [tʲ, dʲ, nʲ, rʲ]), [aː] evolves instead to [ie̯]. This is known as Bartsch's law, and can be dated to the sixth or seventh century. Examples: *cugitāre > [kujeˈtaːre] > [kujeˈdaːre] > [kujˈdaːre] > [kui̯ˈdʲaːre] >> [kui̯ˈdie̯r] OF cuidier "to think", mansiōnātam > [mazʲoˈnaːda] > [mazʲˈnʲaːda] > [mai̯zˈnie̯ðə] > OF maisniée "household".
- Other vowel changes:
  - /u/ > /y/ (sixth or seventh century). (This shift, along with the later /o/ > /u/, is an areal feature common to most Gallo-Romance languages.)
  - [au̯] > [ɔ]. This takes place after the palatalization of velars before /a/.
  - [ie̯i̯, uo̯i̯], from Proto-Italo-Western Romance *[ɛ, ɔ] before a palatal glide, are simplified to [i, ui̯] (eighth century). (Alternatively, Pope 1952 explains the development of the second as [ue̯j] > [ye̯j] > [yi̯j] > [yi̯].)
    - lectum > *[liejtə] > lit, noctem > *[nuojtə] > nuit, peior > */ˈpiejrə/ > pire
    - Compare the development of [eː] to [i] when preceded by a palatal or palatalized consonant, described above.
  - Similarly, [ai̯] becomes [i] when preceded by a palatal consonant: iacet > OF gist [d͡ʒist], cacat > OF chie [ˈtʃiə].
  - Second unstressed vowel loss (complete by around 700 AD):
    - In unstressed final syllables, all vowels except /a/ are lost, unless this loss would result in an impermissible final cluster. In that case, the vowel is retained as [ə]: mortem > mort, but vincere > veintre (Eualia).
    - Unstressed /a/ becomes [ə] in final syllables and in open word-medial syllables.
- Other consonant changes:
  - /h/ (one of the first consonants lost from Classical Latin) is reintroduced in borrowings from Germanic languages.
  - Single intervocalic [dzʲ] is eventually deaffricated to [zʲ], upon which it merges with the outcome of /sj/. There is conflicting evidence of the date of this sound change. The consonant derived from Latin /k/ before a front vowel seems to have still been a palatalized affricate [dzʲ] or [i̯dz] when the following vowel was lost in a final syllable, resulting in word-final [i̯ts] in Early Old French (spelled "iz"), later simplified to [i̯s]. In contrast, the consonant derived from Latin /t/ + yod seems to have become a palatalized fricative by the time the following vowel was lost in a final syllable, resulting in word-final [i̯s] in Early Old French. In the Sequence of Saint Eulalia, the letter ⟨z⟩ may represent [dz] in the words "domnizelle" and "bellezour" (from Latin *domnicella and *bellatiorem).
    - picem > EOF peiz, nucem > EOF noiz, crucem > EOF croiz, pacem > EOF paiz, vocem > EOF voiz
    - palatium > EOF palais, pretium > EOF pris
  - Degemination of obstruents: At some point after the lenition of single intervocalic [b d ɡ dzʲ] to [v ð ɣ zʲ~i̯z], geminate obstruents are simplified to single consonants. This change is variously dated from the 7th-9th century. Since diphthongization of /ɛ ɔ/, diphthongization of /e, o/ and fronting of /a/ (discussed above) occur only in originally open syllables, some analysts assume that degemination must postdate all of these sound changes. However, it is possible that the distinction at the time of these sound changes was not in the length of the consonant, but in the length of the vowel.
  - Intervocalic /v/ (probably still pronounced as bilabial [β]) is lost when followed, or sometimes when preceded by a rounded vowel:
    - *nūba > [ˈnuβa] > French nue, *habūtum > [əˈy] > French eu, *bibūtum > [bəˈy] > French bu
  - [ɣ] is lost in contexts where it did not evolve to [j]; namely, when either the preceding or the following vowel was rounded:
    - locāre > [loˈɣaːre] > French louer, rūga > French rue
  - Obstruents are devoiced when final or when followed by a voiceless obstruent, including after vowel loss.
  - /s/ is affricated to [ts] after palatal [ɲ] or [ʎ] (dolēs > duels "you hurt" but colligis > */ˈkɔljes/ > cuelz, cueuz "you gather"; iungis > */ˈjonjes/ > joinz "you join"; fīlius > filz "son": ⟨z⟩ in such words represents [ts]).
  - Palatal [ɲ] is depalatalized to [n] when not followed by a vowel (ie. when final or followed by a consonant).
    - In first-person verb forms, it may remain palatal when final because of the influence of the palatalized subjunctives.
    - [ɲ] > [i̯n] when depalatalisinɡ (cuneum > /ˈkonʲo/ > coin, balneum > /ˈbanjo/ > bain but montāneam > /monˈtanja/ > montagne.)
  - Palatal [ʎ] is depalatalized to [l] when followed by a consonant, but not when word-final (oculus > ueilz [ˈu̯eʎts] > ['u̯elts]).

=== To Old French, c. 1100 ===
- Loss of /f/, /p/, /k/ before final /s/, /t/. (dēbet > Strasbourg Oaths dift /deift/ > OF doit.)
- Loss of /θ/ and /ð/. When it results in a hiatus of /a/ with a following vowel, the /a/ becomes a schwa /ə/.
- Word-final /rn/, /rm/ > /r/ (diurnum > EOF jorn > OF jor; vermem > EOF verm > OF ver; dormit > OF dort).
- Deletion or vocalization of /l/ (> [ɫ]) before consonants:
  - [ɫ] is simply deleted after /i/ (filz /ˈfilts/ > fiz [ˈfits]).
  - [ɫ] is also deleted after rounded vowels [ou̯], [u], and [y] (multum > [moɫt] > molt~mult [mut]).
  - [ɫ] becomes [u̯] after the remaining vowels (alterum > [aɫtrə] > autre [au̯trə]).
    - However, /æ/ (< /a/ in open syllables) and /ɛ/ when affected by this process, become the sequences [i̯eu̯] and [ɛ̯au̯], respectively (pālus > [pæɫs] > pieus [pi̯eu̯s], and bellus > [bɛɫs] > beaus [bɛ̯au̯s]).
- [ei̯] > [oi̯] (blocked by nasalization; see below).
- [ou̯] > [eu̯], however this is blocked if a labial consonant follows, in which case the segment remains [ou̯], ultimately becoming [u] later. (lupa > OF louve.)
- [uo̯] > [ue̯] (blocked by nasalization; see below).
- [u̯ou̯] > [u̯eu̯] > [eu̯] after labials and velars, but [i̯eu̯] elsewhere (Latin locus → /lueu/ → lieu /ljø/, but *volet → [vuoɫt] → [vueɫt] → [vueut] → veut /vø/).
- /a/ develops allophone [ɑ] before /s/, which later develops into a separate phoneme.
- Loss of /s/ before voiced consonant (passing first through /h/), with lengthening of preceding vowel. That produces a new set of long vowel phonemes, as is described more completely in the following section.

=== To Late Old French, c. 1250–1300 ===
Changes here affect oral and nasal vowels alike, unless otherwise indicated.

| change | condition | notes |
|---|---|---|
| /o/ > /u/ | everywhere | |
| [ɔu̯] > /u/ | everywhere | afterward, ⟨ou⟩ is a common spelling of /u/, regardless of origin. |
| [ue̯], [eu̯] > /œ/ | everywhere | Nasal /ũẽ̯/ segments, for which there had dialectal variation with nasal /ũ/ previously, are all shifted (or returned) to /ũ/ (ultimately becoming /ɔ̃/) before this can occur; e.g. Latin bonum > OF buen > LOF bon. |
| Rising diphthongs develop when the first element of diphthong is /u/, /y/, /i/.; Stress shifts to second element. | everywhere | Hence [yi̯] > [ɥi] |
| [oi̯] > /we/ | everywhere | Later, /we/ > /ɛ/ in some words like français; note doublet François. |
| [ai̯] > /ɛ/ | everywhere | afterward, ⟨ai⟩ is a common spelling of /ɛ/, regardless of origin. |
| /e/ > /ɛ/ | In closed syllables. | |
| Deaffrication: /ts/ > /s/; /tʃ/ > /ʃ/; /dʒ/ > /ʒ/ | everywhere | |
| Phonemicization of /a/ vs. /ɑ/ | [ɑ] was initially an allophone of /a/ before /s/, /z/ that was phonemicized when /ts/ > /s/. | *[ˈtʃatsə] > /ʃas(ə)/, chasse ("he hunts").; *[ˈtʃɑsə] > /ʃɑs(ə)/, châsse ("reliquary, frame"); Later losses of /s/ produced further minimal pairs. |
| syllable-final consonant loss; fusion with or compensatory lengthening of preceding vowels | word-internal syllable-final position | Consonants in coda position word-internally underwent weakening and loss (Gess 1996). This affected /S/ ([z] before voiced consonants and [s] before voiceless ones), /N/ (=nasal consonants), and to some extent the most sonorous coda consonant, /r/. Syllable-final /s/ reduced to [h] before deleting. Borrowings into English suggest that the process occurred first when the following consonant was voiced but not when it was unvoiced (this explains the English pronunciations isle vs. feast). This process was accompanied by compensatory lengthening of the preceding vowel. Preconsonantal ⟨s⟩ was retained as a marker of vowel length (sometimes non-etymologically) until being substituted by ⟨ˆ⟩. Syllable-final nasal consonants nasalized and then were absorbed into the preceding vowels, leading to phonemic nasal vowels. Where syllable-final /r/ was weakened and lost word-internally, it was mostly later restored with the notable exception of morphemic -er. |

=== To Middle French, c. 1500 ===
Changes here affect oral and nasal vowels alike, unless otherwise indicated.

- ⟨ei⟩ /ei/ > /ɛ/ (the [ei̯] diphthong is maintained in Quebec French: neige "snow" [nei̯ʒ(ə)] or [naɪ̯ʒ(ə)]).
- Loss of final consonants before a word beginning with a consonant. That produces a three-way pronunciation for many words (alone, followed by a vowel, followed by a consonant), which is still maintained in the words six "six" and dix "ten" (and until recently neuf "nine"), e.g. dix /dis/ "ten" but dix amis /diz aˈmi/ "ten friends" and dix femmes /di ˈfam(ə)/ "ten women".
- Subject pronouns start to become mandatory because of loss of phonetic differences between inflections.
- Medieval apical s, as in saint, merges into deaffricated ⟨c⟩ as in ceint, thus merging soft ⟨c⟩ and ⟨s⟩.

=== To Early Modern French, c. 1700 ===
- ⟨au⟩ /au/ > [ɔː] > /o/ in Late Middle French (around the 16th century).
- ⟨eau⟩ /ɛau/ > [e̯au̯] > [e̯o] in Later Middle French > /o/ (from around the end of the 16th century to the mid-17th century).
- Loss of most phonemically lengthened vowels (preserved in Belgian, Acadian French and Quebec French).
- Loss of final consonants in a word standing alone. That produces a two-way pronunciation for many words (in close connection with a following word that begins with a vowel), often still maintained: nous voyons /nu vwaˈjɔ̃/ "we see" vs. nous avons /nuz aˈvɔ̃/ "we have". That phenomenon is known as liaison.
- ⟨oi⟩ /we/ > /wa/ (see above – To Late Old French) or /ɛ/ (étoit > était; the spelling was not changed until the 19th century). This also affects certain other instances of /we ~ o̯e/; e.g. moelle /mwal/, poêle /pwɑl/.
  - Change into /ɛ/ is relatively rare in standard French, it occurs notably in the imperfect tense suffixes (-ais, -ait, and -aient), the adjectival suffix -ois > -ais, as well as other few words, e.g. connoître > connaître.
  - The pronunciation /we/ is preserved in some forms of Quebec and Acadian French, especially by old speakers.
- Instances of /h/ were again deleted in the late seventeenth century. The phoneme /h/ had been reintroduced to the language through the absorption of loanwords, primarily of Germanic origin, and these are the /h/ instances that were lost this time around. However a Germanic ⟨h⟩ usually disallows liaison: les halles /le.al(ə)/, les haies /le.ɛ/, les haltes /le.alt(ə)/, whereas a Latin ⟨h⟩ allows liaison: les herbes /lezɛrb(ə)/, les hôtels /lezotɛl/.

=== To Modern French, c. 2000 ===
- /r/ becomes a uvular sound ("Guttural R"), realized as either a trill /ʀ/ or fricative /ʁ/, in most accents. The alveolar trill is maintained in Acadia, Louisiana, some parts of Québec and in Francophone Africa.
- Merger of /ʎ/ (spelled ⟨il⟩ in œil and travail) into /j/, which had begun in the seventeenth and eighteenth centuries, reaches completion around the beginning of the nineteenth century (see Mouillé)
- Elision of final /ə/, and occasionally of /ə/ elsewhere, unless a sequence of three consonants would be produced (such constraints operate over multiword sequences of words that are syntactically connected). Occitan French tends to be more conservative, while the elision of final /ə/ does not occur in Francophone Africa.
- Changing use of liaison, which overall becomes rarer.
- In Metropolitan French, gradual merging of /œ̃/ and /ɛ̃/, both are realized as [æ̃], but the distinction is maintained in Southern France, Switzerland, Belgium, Quebec and Francophone Africa.
- In Metropolitan French, loss of the phoneme /ɑ/, merged with /a/, both are realized as [ä], but the distinction is maintained in French Switzerland, Belgium, Quebec and Francophone Africa.
- In Metropolitan French, loss of the phoneme /ə/, merged with /ø/, both are realized as [ø], but the distinction is maintained in Quebec French.
- In Metropolitan French, loss of the phoneme /ɛː/, merged with /ɛ/, both are realized as [ɛ], but the distinction is maintained in Northern French, Switzerland, Belgium, Quebec and Francophone Africa.
- In Metropolitan French, merger of /ɔ/ into /o/ when word-final, but the distinction is maintained in Belgian French.

== Loss of final consonants ==
The loss (apocopation) of final consonants does not just affect French and all other langues d'oïl, but also some dialects of Franco-Provençal and Occitan. This process began in the late 12th century CE, and this might have to do with the variable pronunciation of final consonants.

- The first known consonant to be affected was /s/ and it occurred before consonants. Prior to this, /f/ and /s/ were voiced to /v/ and /z/ before words starting in a vowel.
- Final consonants outside of consonant clusters could be retained before a word starting in vowel, at pause, or in monosyllabic words (sec [sɛk] vs. cerf [sɛːʁ]).
- /l/ could vocalize or delete in word-final position, but this process is unpredictable, due to later analogy and restoration of this consonant.
  - /l/ usually does not change after low and mid vowels, except through analogy with the respective plural forms. (caballus > cheval instead of stereotypical chevau, but capillus > chevel > cheveu based on its plural cheveus).
  - /l/ tends to be unpronounced after high vowels as of 13th century, however, most words have restored this consonant in Classical French (fil [fi] > [fil], but cul [ky] remains as such).

== Nasalization ==
Nasalization of vowels before /n/ or /m/ occurred gradually over several hundred years, beginning with the low vowels, possibly as early as 900, and finishing with the high vowels, possibly as late as c. 1300. Numerous changes occurred afterwards that are still continuing.

The following steps occurred during the Old French period:

- Nasalization of /a/, /e/, /ɔ/ before /n/ or /m/ (originally, in all circumstances, including when a vowel followed).
- Nasalization occurs before and blocks the changes /ei/ > /oi/ and /ou/ > /eu/. However, the sequence /õĩ/ occurs because /oi/ has more than one origin: coin "corner" < cvnevm. The sequences /ĩẽn/ or /ĩẽm/, and /ũẽn/ or /ũẽm/, also occur, but the last two occur in only a few words, in each case alternating with a non-diphthongized variant: om or uem (ModF on), and bon or buen (ModF bon). The version without the diphthong apparently arose in unstressed environments and is the only one that survived.
- Lowering of /ẽ/ and /ɛ̃/ to [æ̃] but not in the sequences /jẽ/ and /ẽj/: bien, plein. The realization of /ẽ/ to [æ̃] probably occurred during the 11th or early 12th century and did not affect Old Norman or Anglo-Norman. Ultimately [æ̃] merged into /ã/.
- Nasalization of /i/, /u/, /y/ before /n/ or /m/.
- It is not clear if the third-person plural ending -ent contained a nasalized schwa /ə̃/; although the n is consistently kept in writing, by Early Modern French at the latest it had become non-nasal /ə/.

The following steps occurred during the Middle French period:

- Lowering of /ũ/ > /õ/ > /ɔ̃/. (/ũ/ usually comes from original /oN/, as original /u/ became /y/.)
- Denasalization of vowels before /n/ or /m/ followed by a vowel or semi-vowel. (Examples like femme /fam/ "woman" < OF /ˈfãmə/ < fēminam and donne /dɔn/ "(he) gives" < OF /ˈdũnə/ < dōnat, with lowering and lack of diphthongization before a nasal even when a vowel followed, show that nasalization originally operated in all environments.)
- Deletion of /n/ or /m/ after remaining nasal vowels (when preceding a consonant or word-final): dent /dɑ̃/ "tooth" < */dãt/ < OFr dent /dãnt/ < EOFr */dɛ̃nt/ < dentem.

The following steps occurred during the Modern French period:

- /ĩ/ > /ẽ/ > /ɛ̃/ > [æ̃] ([ẽɪ̯̃] in Quebec French). That also affects diphthongs such as /ĩẽ/ > /jẽ/ > /jɛ̃/ (bien /bjɛ̃/ "well" < bene); /ỹĩ/ > /ɥĩ/ > /ɥɛ̃/, (juin /ʒɥɛ̃/ "June" < iūnium); /õĩ/ > /wẽ/ > /wɛ̃/, (coin /kwɛ̃/ "corner" < cuneum). Also, /ãĩ/ > /ɛ̃/, (pain /pɛ̃/ "bread" < pānem); /ẽĩ/ > /ɛ̃/, (plein /plɛ̃/ "full" < plēnum).
- /ã/ > /ɑ̃/ > [ɒ̃], but the [ã] sound is maintained in Quebec French.
- /ɔ̃/ > [õ] ([õʊ̯̃] in Quebec French)
- /ỹ/ > /ø̃/ > /œ̃/ ([ɚ̃] in Quebec French). In the 20th century, this sound has low functional load and has tended to merge with /ɛ̃/.

That leaves only four nasal vowels: /ɛ̃/, /ɑ̃/, /ɔ̃/, and /œ̃/, the last often no longer being distinguished from the first.

== See also ==
- Bartsch's law
- History of French § Internal phonological history

== Bibliography ==
- Alkire, Ti; Rosen, Carol (2010). Romance Languages: A Historical Introduction. Cambridge: Cambridge University Press. doi:10.1017/CBO9780511845192. ISBN 978-0-521-88915-5.
- Boyd-Bowman, Peter (1980), From Latin to Romance in Sound Charts, Georgetown University Press, ISBN 978-0878400775
- Brittain, Margaret S. (1900). Historical Primer of French Phonetics and Inflection. Oxford: Clarendon Press.
- Gess, Randall (1996) Optimality Theory in the Historical Phonology of French. PhD dissertation, University of Washington
- Buckley, Eugene (2009). "Phonetics and phonology in Gallo-Romance palatalisation". Transactions of the Philological Society. 107: 31–65. doi:10.1111/j.1467-968X.2008.00212.x.
- Chapman, Carol (1997). "Diminutive plural infixation and the 'West Franconian' problem". In Jacek Fisiak (ed.). Linguistic Reconstruction and Typology. Mouton de Gruyter.
- Fought, John (1979). "The 'Medieval Sibilants' of the Eulalia-Ludwigslied Manuscript and Their Development in Early Old French". Language. 55 (4): 842–858. doi:10.2307/412747. JSTOR 412747.
- Harris, Martin (1988), "French", in Harris, Martin; Vincent, Nigel (eds.), The Romance Languages, Oxford University Press, pp. 209–245, ISBN 978-0195208290
- Kerkhof, Peter Alexander (2018). Language, law and loanwords in early medieval Gaul: Language contact and studies in Gallo-Romance phonology (Thesis). hdl:1887/66116.
- Kibler, William (1984), Introduction to Old French, Modern Language Association of America, ISBN 978-0873522922
- Loporcaro, Michele (2015). Vowel Length from Latin to Romance. Oxford University Press.
- Politzer, Robert L. (1954). "On the Development of Latin Stops in Aragonese". WORD. 10 (1): 60–65. doi:10.1080/00437956.1954.11659513.
- Pope, Mildred Katharine (1952), From Latin to French, with Especial Consideration of Anglo-Norman, Manchester University Press, ISBN 0719001765
- Porter, L. C. (1960). "The "Cantilène de Sainte Eulalie": Phonology and Graphemics". Studies in Philology. 57 (4): 587–596. ISSN 0039-3738. JSTOR 4173323.
- Price, Glanville (1971), The French language: present and past (reprinted with corrections 1979 ed.), Jameson Books, ISBN 0-7131-5703-8
- Recasens, Daniel (2020). "Palatalizations in the Romance languages". Oxford Research Encyclopedias. doi:10.1093/acrefore/9780199384655.013.435. ISBN 978-0-19-938465-5.
- Repetti, Lori (2016). "Palatalization". In Ledgeway, Adam; Maiden, Martin (eds.). The Oxford guide to the Romance languages. Oxford University Press. pp. 658–668. doi:10.1093/acprof:oso/9780199677108.001.0001. ISBN 978-0-19-967710-8.
- Rickard, Peter (2003) [2nd edition first published 1989]. A History of the French Language (2nd ed.). Routledge. ISBN 9781134838783.
- Vaissière, Jacqueline (1996), "From Latin to Modern French: on diachronic changes and synchronic Variations" (PDF), AIPUK, Arbetisberitche, Institut für Phonetik und digitale Sprachverarbeitung, Universität Kiel, vol. 31, pp. 61–74
