= History of French =

Overview of the history of the French language

French is a Romance language (meaning that it is descended primarily from Vulgar Latin) that specifically is classified under the Gallo-Romance languages.

The discussion of the history of a language is typically divided into "external history", describing the ethnic, political, social, technological, and other changes that affected the languages, and "internal history", describing the phonological and grammatical changes undergone by the language itself.

== External social and political history ==
=== Roman Gaul (Gallia) ===
Before the Roman conquest of what is now France by Julius Caesar (58–52 BC), much of present France was inhabited by Celtic-speaking people referred to by the Romans as Gauls and Belgae. Southern France was also home to a number of other remnant linguistic and ethnic groups including Iberians along the eastern part of the Pyrenees and western Mediterranean coast, the remnant Ligures on the eastern Mediterranean coast and in the alpine areas, Greek colonials in places such as Marseille and Antibes, and Vascones and Aquitani (Proto-Basques) in much of the southwest. The Gaulish-speaking population is held to have continued speaking Gaulish even as considerable Romanisation of the local material culture occurred, with Gaulish and Latin coexisting for centuries under Roman rule and the last attestation of Gaulish to be deemed credible having been written in the second half of the 6th century about the destruction of a pagan shrine in Auvergne.

The Celtic population of Gaul had spoken Gaulish, which is moderately well attested and appears to have had wide dialectal variation including one distinctive variety, Lepontic. The French language evolved from Vulgar Latin (a Latinised popular Italic dialect called sermo vulgaris), but it was strongly influenced by Gaulish in its grammar. Examples include sandhi phenomena (liaison, resyllabification, lenition), the loss of unstressed syllables and the vowel system (such as raising /u/, /o/ → /y/, /u/, fronting stressed /a/ → /e/, /ɔ/ → /ø/ or /œ/). Syntactic oddities attributable to Gaulish include the intensive prefix ro- ~ re- (cited in the Vienna glossary, 5th century) (cf. luire "to glimmer" vs. reluire "to shine"; related to Irish ro- and Welsh rhy- "very"), emphatic structures, prepositional periphrastic phrases to render verbal aspect and the semantic development of oui "yes", aveugle "blind".

Some sound changes are attested: /ps/ → /xs/ and /pt/ → /xt/ appears in a pottery inscription from la Graufesenque (1st century) in which the word paraxsidi is written for paropsides. Similarly, the development -cs- → /xs/ → /is/ and -ct- → /xt/ → /it/, the latter being common to much of Western Romance languages, also appears in inscriptions: Divicta ~ Divixta, Rectugenus ~ Rextugenus ~ Reitugenus, and is present in Welsh, e.g. *seχtan → saith "seven", *eχtamos → eithaf "extreme". For Romance, compare:

- Latin fraxinus "ash (tree)" → OFr fraisne (mod. frêne), Occitan fraisse, Catalan freixe, Portuguese freixo, Romansch fraissen (vs. Italian frassino, Romanian frasin, Spanish fresno).
- Latin lactem "milk" → French lait, Welsh llaeth, Portuguese leite, Catalan llet, Piemontese lait, Liguro leite (vs. Italian latte, Occitan lach, Lombardo làcc, Romansch latg, Spanish leche).

Both changes sometimes had a cumulative effect in French: Latin capsa → *kaχsa → caisse (vs. Italian cassa, Spanish caja) or captīvus → *kaχtivus → Occitan caitiu, OFr chaitif (mod. chétif "wretched, feeble", cf. Welsh caeth "bondman, slave", vs. Italian cattivo, Spanish cautivo).

In French and the adjoining folk dialects and closely related languages, some 200 words of Gaulish origin have been retained, most of which pertaining to folk life. They include:

- land features (bief "reach, mill race", combe "hollow", grève "sandy shore", lande "heath");
- plant names (berle "water parsnip", bouleau "birch", bourdaine "black alder", chêne "oak", corme "service berry", gerzeau "corncockle", if "yew", vélar/vellar "hedge mustard");
- wildlife (alouette "lark", barge "godwit", loche "loach", pinson "finch", vandoise "dace", vanneau "lapwing");
- rural and farm life, most notably: boue "mud", cervoise "ale", charrue "plow", glaise "loam", gord "kiddle, stake net", jachère "fallow field", javelle "sheaf, bundle, fagot", marne "marl", mouton "sheep", raie "lynchet", sillon "furrow", souche "tree stump, tree base", tarière "auger, gimlet", tonne "barrel";
- some common verbs (braire "to bray", changer "to change", craindre "to fear", jaillir "to surge, gush").; and
- loan translations: aveugle "blind", from Latin ab oculis "eyeless", calque of Gaulish exsops "blind", literally "eyeless" (vs. Latin caecus → OFr cieu, It. cieco, Sp. ciego, or orbus → Occ. òrb, Venetian orbo, Romanian orb).

Other Celtic words were not borrowed directly but brought in through Latin, some of which had become common in Latin, braies "knee-length pants", chainse "tunic", char "dray, wagon", daim "roe deer", étain "tin", glaive "broad sword", manteau "coat", vassal "serf, knave". Latin quickly took hold among the urban aristocracy for mercantile, official and educational reasons but did not prevail in the countryside until some four or five centuries later since Latin was of little or no social value to the landed gentry and peasantry. This eventual spread of Latin can be attributed to social factors in the Late Empire such as the movement from urban-focused power to village-centred economies and legal serfdom.

=== Franks ===
In the 3rd century, Western Europe started to be invaded by Germanic tribes from the north and the east, and some of the groups settled in Gaul. In the history of the French language, the most important groups are the Franks in much of northern France, the Alemanni in the modern German/French border area (Alsace), the Burgundians in the Rhône (and the Saone) Valley, the Suebi in the Spanish autonomous community of Galicia and Northern Portugal, the Vandals in Southern Andalusia, and the Visigoths in much of southern France as well as Spain. The Frankish language had a profound influence on the Latin spoken in their respective regions by altering both the pronunciation (especially the vowel system phonemes: e, eu, u, short o) and the syntax. It also introduced a number of new words (see List of French words of Germanic origin). Sources disagree on how much of the vocabulary of modern French (excluding French dialects) comes from Germanic words and range from just 500 words (≈1%) (representing loans from ancient Germanic languages: Gothic and Frankish) to 15% of the modern vocabulary (representing all Germanic loans up to modern times: Gothic, Frankish, Old Norse/Scandinavian, Dutch, German and English) to even higher if Germanic words coming from Latin and other Romance languages are taken into account. (Note that according to the Académie française, only 5% of French words come from English.)

Changes in lexicon/morphology/syntax:

- The name of the language itself, français, comes from Old French franceis/francesc (compare Medieval Latin franciscus) from the Germanic frankisc "french, frankish" from Frank ('freeman'). The Franks referred to their land as Franko(n), which became Francia in Latin in the 3rd century (then an area in Gallia Belgica, somewhere in modern-day Belgium or the Netherlands). The name Gaule ("Gaul") was also taken from the Frankish *Walholant ("Land of the Romans/Gauls").
- Several terms and expressions associated with their social structure (baron/baronne, bâtard, bru, chambellan, échevin, félon, féodal, forban, gars/garçon, leude, lige, maçon, maréchal, marquis, meurtrier, sénéchal).
- Military terms (agrès/gréer, attaquer, bière ["stretcher"], dard, étendard, fief, flanc, flèche, gonfalon, guerre, garder, garnison, hangar, heaume, loge, marcher, patrouille, rang, rattraper, targe, trêve, troupe).
- Colours derived from Frankish and other Germanic languages (blanc/blanche, bleu, blond/blonde, brun, fauve, gris, guède).
- Other examples among common words are abandonner, arranger, attacher, auberge, bande, banquet, bâtir, besogne, bille, blesser, bois, bonnet, bord, bouquet, bouter, braise, broderie, brosse, chagrin, choix, chic, cliché, clinquant, coiffe, corroyer, crèche, danser, échaffaud, engage, effroi, épargner, épeler, étal, étayer, étiquette, fauteuil, flan, flatter, flotter, fourbir, frais, frapper, gai, galant, galoper, gant, gâteau, glisser, grappe, gratter, gredin, gripper, guère, guise, hache, haïr, halle, hanche, harasser, héron, heurter, jardin, jauger, joli, laid, lambeau, layette, lécher, lippe, liste, maint, maquignon, masque, massacrer, mauvais, mousse, mousseron, orgueil, parc, patois, pincer, pleige, rat, rater, regarder, remarquer, riche/richesse, rime, robe, rober, saisir, salon, savon, soupe, tampon, tomber, touaille, trépigner, trop, tuyau and many words starting with a hard g (like gagner, garantie, gauche, guérir) or with an aspired h (haine, hargneux, hâte, haut)
- Endings in -ard (from Frankish hard: canard, pochard, richard), -aud (from Frankish wald: crapaud, maraud, nigaud), -an/-and (from old suffix -anc, -enc: paysan, cormoran, Flamand, tisserand, chambellan) all very common family name affixes for French names.
- Endings in -ange (Eng. -ing, Grm. -ung; boulange/boulanger, mélange/mélanger, vidange/vidanger), diminutive -on (oisillon)
- Many verbs ending in -ir (2nd group, see French conjugation) such as affranchir, ahurir, choisir, guérir, haïr, honnir, jaillir, lotir, nantir, rafraîchir, ragaillardir, tarir, etc.
- The prefix mé(s)- (from Frankish "missa-", as in mésentente, mégarde, méfait, mésaventure, mécréant, mépris, méconnaissance, méfiance, médisance)
- The prefix for-, four- as in forbannir, forcené, forlonger, (se) fourvoyer, etc. from Frankish fir-, fur- (cf German ver-; English for-) merged with Old French fuers "outside, beyond" from Latin foris. Latin foris was not used as a prefix in Classical Latin, but appears as a prefix in Medieval Latin following the Germanic invasions.
- The prefix en-, em- (which reinforced and merged with Latin in- "in, on, into") was extended to fit new formations not previously found in Latin. Influenced or calqued from Frankish *in- and *an-, usually with an intensive or perfective sense: emballer, emblaver, endosser, enhardir, enjoliver, enrichir, envelopper:
- The syntax shows the systematic presence of a subject pronoun in front of the verb, as in the Germanic languages: je vois, tu vois, il voit. The subject pronoun is optional, function of the parameter pro-drop, in most other Romance languages (as in Spanish veo, ves, ve).
- The inversion of subject-verb to verb-subject to form the interrogative is characteristic of the Germanic languages but is not found in any major Romance language, except Venetian and French (Vous avez un crayon. vs. Avez-vous un crayon?: "Do you have a pencil?").
- The adjective placed in front of the noun is typical of Germanic languages. The word order is more frequent in French than in the other major Romance languages and is occasionally compulsory (belle femme, vieil homme, grande table, petite table). When it is optional, it can change the meaning: grand homme ("great man") and le plus grand homme ("the greatest man") vs. homme grand ("tall man") and l'homme le plus grand ("the tallest man"), certaine chose vs. chose certaine. In Walloon, the order "adjective + noun" is the general rule, as in Old French and North Cotentin Norman.
- Several words are calqued or modelled on corresponding terms from Germanic languages (bienvenue, cauchemar, chagriner, compagnon, entreprendre, manoeuvre, manuscrit, on, pardonner, plupart, sainfoin, tocsin, toujours).

Frankish had a determining influence on the birth of Old French, which partly explains that Old French is the earliest-attested Romance language, such as in the Oaths of Strasbourg and Sequence of Saint Eulalia. The new speech diverged so markedly from the Latin that it was no longer mutually intelligible. The Old Low Frankish influence is also primarily responsible for the differences between the langue d'oïl and langue d'oc (Occitan) since different parts of Northern France remained bilingual in Latin and Germanic for several centuries, which correspond exactly to the places in which the first documents in Old French were written. Frankish shaped the popular Latin spoken there and gave it a very distinctive character compared to the other future Romance languages. The very first noticeable influence is the substitution of a Germanic stress accent for the Latin melodic accent, which resulted in diphthongisation, distinction between long and short vowels and the loss of the unaccentuated syllable and of final vowels: Latin decima > F dîme (> E dime. Italian decima; Spanish diezmo); Vulgar Latin dignitate > OF deintié (> E dainty. Occitan dinhitat; Italian dignità; Spanish dignidad); VL catena > OF chaiene (> E chain. Occitan cadena; Italian catena; Spanish cadena). On the other hand, a common word like Latin aqua > Occitan aigue became Old French ewe > F eau 'water' (and évier sink) and was likely influenced by the OS or OHG word pronunciation aha (PG *ahwo).

In addition, two new phonemes that no longer existed in Vulgar Latin returned: [h] and [w] (> OF g(u)-, ONF w- cf. Picard w-), e.g. VL altu > OF halt 'high' (influenced by OLF *hauh; ≠ Italian, Spanish alto; Occitan naut); VL vespa > F guêpe (ONF wespe; Picard wespe) 'wasp' (influenced by OLF *waspa; ≠ Occitan vèspa; Italian vespa; Spanish avispa); L viscus > F gui 'mistletoe' (influenced by OLF *wihsila 'morello', together with analogous fruits, when they are not ripe; ≠ Occitan vesc; Italian vischio); LL vulpiculu 'little fox' (from L vulpes 'fox') > OF g[o]upil (influenced by OLF *wulf 'wolf'; ≠ Italian volpe). Italian and Spanish words of Germanic origin borrowed from French or directly from Germanic also retained [gw] and [g]: It, Sp. guerra 'war'. These examples show a clear result of bilingualism, which frequently altered the initial syllable of the Latin.

There is also the converse example in which the Latin word influenced the Germanic word: framboise 'raspberry' from OLF *brambasi (cf. OHG brāmberi > Brombeere 'mulberry'; E brambleberry; *basi 'berry' cf. Got. -basi, Dutch bes 'berry') conflated with LL fraga or OF fraie 'strawberry', which explains the shift to [f] from [b], and in turn the final -se of framboise turned fraie into fraise (≠ Occitan fragosta 'raspberry', Italian fragola 'strawberry'. Portuguese framboesa 'raspberry' and Spanish frambuesa are from French).

Philologists such as Pope (1934) estimate that perhaps 15% of the vocabulary of Modern French still derives from Germanic sources, but the proportion was larger in Old French, as the language was re-Latinised and partly Italianised by clerics and grammarians in the Middle Ages and later. Nevertheless, many such words like haïr "to hate" (≠ Latin odiare > Italian odiare, Spanish odiar, Occitan asirar) and honte "shame" (≠ Latin vĕrēcundia > Occitan vergonha, Italian vergogna, Spanish vergüenza) remain common.

Urban T. Holmes Jr. estimated that German was spoken as a second language by public officials in western Austrasia and Neustria as late as the 850s and that it had completely disappeared as a spoken language from those regions only in the 10th century, but some traces of Germanic elements still survive, especially in dialectal French (Poitevin, Norman, Burgundian, Walloon, Picard etc.).

=== Normans and terms from the Low Countries ===
In 1204 AD, the Duchy of Normandy was integrated into the Crown lands of France, and many words were introduced into French from Norman of which about 150 words of Scandinavian origin are still in use. Most of the words are about the sea and seafaring: abraquer, alque, bagage, bitte, cingler, équiper (to equip), flotte, fringale, girouette, guichet, hauban, houle, hune, mare, marsouin, mouette, quille, raz, siller, touer, traquer, turbot, vague, varangue, varech. Others pertain to farming and daily life: accroupir, amadouer, bidon, bigot, brayer, brette, cottage, coterie, crochet, duvet, embraser, fi, flâner, guichet, haras, harfang, harnais, houspiller, marmonner, mièvre, nabot, nique, quenotte, raccrocher, ricaner, rincer, rogue.

Likewise, most words borrowed from Dutch deal with trade or are nautical in nature: affaler, amarrer, anspect, bar (sea-bass), bastringuer, bière (beer), blouse (bump), botte, bouée, bouffer, boulevard, bouquin, cague, cahute, cambuse, caqueter, choquer, diguer, drôle, dune, équiper (to set sail), frelater, fret, grouiller, hareng, hère, lamaneur, lège, manne, mannequin, maquiller, matelot, méringue, moquer, plaque, sénau, tribord, vacarme, as are words from Low German: bivouac, bouder, homard, vogue, yole, and English of this period: arlequin (from Italian arlecchino < Norman hellequin < OE *Herla cyning), bateau, bébé, bol ("bowl"), bouline, bousin, cliver, chiffe/chiffon, drague, drain, est, groom, héler, lac (replacing Old French lai), merlin, mouette, nord, ouest, potasse, rade, rhum, sonde, sud, turf, yacht.

=== Langue d'oïl ===
The area of langues d'oïl

For the period until around 1330, some linguists refer to the oïl languages collectively as Old French (ancien français). The earliest extant text in French is the Oaths of Strasbourg from 842; Old French became a literary language with the chansons de geste that told tales of the paladins of Charlemagne and the heroes of the Crusades.

The medieval Italian poet Dante, in his Latin De vulgari eloquentia, classified the Romance languages into three groups by their respective words for "yes": Nam alii oc, alii si, alii vero dicunt oil, "For some say oc, others say si, others say oïl". The oïl languages – from Latin hoc ille, "that is it" – occupied northern France, the oc languages – from Latin hoc, "that" – southern France, and the si languages – from Latin sic, "thus" – the Italian and Iberian Peninsulas. Modern linguists typically add a third group within France around Lyon, the "Arpitan" or "Franco-Provençal language", whose modern word for "yes" is ouè.

The Gallo-Romance group in the north of France, the langue d'oïl like Picard, Walloon and Francien, were influenced by the Germanic languages spoken by the Frankish invaders. From the time period of Clovis I, the Franks extended their rule over northern Gaul. Over time, the French language developed from either the Oïl language found around Paris and Île-de-France (the Francien theory) or from a standard administrative language based on common characteristics found in all Oïl languages (the lingua franca theory).

Langue d'oc used oc or òc for "yes" and is the language group in the south of France and northernmost Spain. The languages, such as Gascon and Provençal, have relatively little Frankish influence.

The Middle Ages also saw the influence of other linguistic groups on the dialects of France.

Modern French, which was derived mainly from the langue d'oïl, acquired the word si to contradict negative statements or respond to negative questions, from cognate forms of "yes" in Spanish and Catalan (sí), Portuguese (sim), and Italian (sì).

From the 4th to the 7th centuries, Brythonic-speaking peoples from Cornwall, Devon and Wales travelled across the English Channel for reasons of trade and of flight from the Anglo-Saxon invasions of England. They established themselves in Armorica, and their language became Breton in more recent centuries, which gave French bijou "jewel" (< Breton bizou from biz "finger") and menhir (< Breton maen "stone" and hir "long").

Attested since the time of Julius Caesar, a non-Celtic people who spoke a Basque-related language inhabited the Novempopulania (Aquitania Tertia) in southwestern France, but the language gradually lost ground to the expanding Romance during a period spanning most of the Early Middle Ages. Proto-Basque influenced the emerging Latin-based language spoken in the area between the Garonne and the Pyrenees, which eventually resulted in the dialect of Occitan called Gascon. Its influence is seen in words like boulbène and cargaison.

Vikings from Scandinavia invaded France from the 9th century onwards and established themselves mostly in what would be called Normandy. The Normans took up the langue d'oïl spoken there, but Norman French remained heavily influenced by Old Norse and its dialects. They also contributed many words to French related to sailing (mouette, crique, hauban, hune etc.) and farming.

After the 1066 Norman Conquest of England, the Normans' language developed into Anglo-Norman, which served as the language of the ruling classes and commerce in England until the Hundred Years' War, when the use of French-influenced English had spread throughout English society.

Around then, many words from Arabic (or from Persian via Arabic) entered French, mainly indirectly through Medieval Latin, Italian and Spanish. There are words for luxury goods (élixir, orange), spices (camphre, safran), trade goods (alcool, bougie, coton), sciences (alchimie, hasard), and mathematics (algèbre, algorithme). It was only after the 19th-century development of French colonies in North Africa that French borrowed words directly from Arabic (toubib, chouia, mechoui).

=== Middle French ===
The first political state to implement Old French as an administrative language was the Kingdom of Jerusalem following the War of the Lombards of the 13th century, the nobility replaced Latin with Outremer French—a koiné of Parisian, Norman, and Picard dialects—to codify the Assises de Jérusalem. This administrative model "rebounded" to Europe through Louis IX, who, after his stay in the Levant (1250–1254), professionalized the French chancery. This trajectory reached its legal peak with the Ordinance of Villers-Cotterêts (1539), where Francis I mandated French as the exclusive language for all legal acts and official communications, effectively ending the official role of Latin and centralizing the state around the Parisian standard. Nevertheless, the first notarized document in Middle French was redacted in the Aosta city in 1532, when in Paris Latin was still in use, while the Aosta Valley as a whole adopted French as the official language in 1536, three years before France itself.

With the imposition of a standardised chancery dialect and the loss of the declension system, the dialect is referred to as Middle French (moyen français). The first grammatical description of French, the Tretté de la Grammaire française by Louis Maigret, was published in 1550. Many of the 700 words of Modern French that originate from Italian were introduced in this period, including several denoting artistic concepts (scenario, piano), luxury items and food. The earliest history of the French language and its literature was also written in this period: the Recueil de l'origine de la langue et poesie françoise, by Claude Fauchet, published in 1581.

=== Modern French ===
The French language of the 17th and 18th centuries, sometimes referred to as Classical French (français classique), followed a period of unification, regulation and purification. Many linguists simply refer to the French language from the 17th century to today as Modern French (français moderne).

The Académie française ('French Academy'), founded in 1634 by Cardinal Richelieu, has been an official body whose goal has been to purify and preserve the French language. The group of 40 members is known as the Immortals, not, as some erroneously believe, because they are chosen to serve for the extent of their lives (which they are), but because of the inscription engraved on the official seal given to them by their founder Richelieu: À l'immortalité ('to [the] Immortality [of the French language]'). The foundation still exists and contributes to the policing of the language and to the adaptation of foreign words and expressions. Some recent modifications include the change from software to logiciel, packet-boat to paquebot, and riding-coat to redingote. The word ordinateur for computer, however, was created not by the Académie but by a linguist appointed by IBM (see ordinateur on the French-language Wikipedia).

From the 17th to the 19th centuries, France was the leading land power in Europe; together with the influence of the Enlightenment, French was therefore the lingua franca of educated Europe, especially with regards to the arts, literature and diplomacy. Monarchs like Frederick II of Prussia and Catherine the Great of Russia spoke and wrote in excellent French. The Russian, German and Scandinavian courts spoke French as their main or official language and regarded their national languages as the language of the peasants. The spread of French to other European countries was also aided by the emigration of persecuted Huguenots.

In the 17th and the 18th centuries, French established itself permanently in the Americas. There is an academic debate about how fluent in French the colonists of New France were. Less than 15% of colonists (25% of the women – chiefly filles du roi – and 5% of the men) were from the Paris region and presumably spoke French, but most of the rest came from north-western and western regions of France in which French was not the usual first language. It is not clearly known how many among those colonists understood French as a second language, and how many among them, nearly all of whom natively spoke an oïl language, could understand and be understood by those who spoke French because of interlinguistic similarity. In any case, such a linguistic unification of all the groups coming from France happened (either in France, on the ships, or in Canada) that many sources noted that all "Canadiens" spoke French (King's French) natively by the end of the 17th century, well before the unification was complete in France. Today, French is the language of about 10 million people (not counting French-based creoles, which are also spoken by about 10 million people) in the Americas.

Through the Académie, public education, centuries of official control and the media, a unified official French language has been forged, but there remains a great deal of diversity today in terms of regional accents and words. For some critics, the "best" pronunciation of the French language is considered to be the one used in Touraine (around Tours and the Loire Valley), but such value judgments are fraught with problems, and with the ever-increasing loss of lifelong attachments to a specific region and the growing importance of the national media, the future of specific "regional" accents is often difficult to predict. The French nation-state, which appeared after the 1789 French Revolution and Napoleon I's empire, unified the French people in particular through the consolidation of the use of the French language. Hence, according to the historian Eric Hobsbawm, "the French language has been essential to the concept of 'France', although in 1789 50% of the French people did not speak it at all, and only 12 to 13% spoke it 'fairly' – in fact, even in oïl language zones, out of a central region, it was not usually spoken except in cities, and, even there, not always in the faubourgs [approximatively translatable to "suburbs"]. In the North as in the South of France, almost nobody spoke French." Hobsbawm highlighted the role of conscription, invented by Napoleon, and of the 1880s public instruction laws, which allowed to mix the various groups of France into a nationalist mold, which created the French citizen and his consciousness of membership to a common nation, and the various patois were progressively eradicated.

==== Issues ====
There is some debate in today's France about the preservation of the French language and the influence of English (see Franglais), especially with regard to international business, the sciences and popular culture. There have been laws (see Toubon law) enacted to require all print ads and billboards with foreign expressions to include a French translation and to require quotas of French-language songs (at least 40%) on the radio. There is also pressure, in differing degrees, from some regions as well as minority political or cultural groups for a measure of recognition and support for their regional languages.

Once the key international language in Europe, being the language of diplomacy from the 17th to the mid-20th centuries, French lost most of its international significance to English in the 20th century, especially after World War II, with the rise of the United States as a dominant global superpower. A watershed was the Treaty of Versailles, which ended World War I and was written in both French and English. A small but increasing number of large multinational firms headquartered in France use English as their working language even in their French operations. Also, to gain international recognition, French scientists often publish their work in English.

Those trends have met some resistance. In March 2006, President Jacques Chirac briefly walked out of an EU summit after Ernest-Antoine Seilliere began addressing the summit in English. In February 2007, Forum Francophone International began organising protests against the "linguistic hegemony" of English in France and in support of the right of French workers to use French as their working language.

French remains the second most-studied foreign language in the world, after English, and is a lingua franca in some regions, notably in Africa. The legacy of French as a living language outside Europe is mixed: it is nearly extinct in some former French colonies (Southeast Asia), but the language has changed to creoles, dialects or pidgins in the French departments in the West Indies even though its people are educated in Standard French. On the other hand, many former French colonies have adopted French as an official language, and the total number of French speakers has increased, especially in Africa.

In the Canadian province of Quebec, different laws have promoted the use of French in administration, business and education since the 1970s. Bill 101, for example, obliges most children whose parents did not attend an English-speaking school to be educated in French. Efforts are also made such as by the Office québécois de la langue française to reduce the variation of French spoken in Quebec and to preserve the distinctiveness of Quebec French.

There has been French emigration to the United States, Australia and South America, but the descendants of those immigrants have been so assimilated that few of them still speak French. In the United States, efforts are ongoing in Louisiana (see CODOFIL) and parts of New England (particularly Maine) to preserve French there.

== Internal phonological history ==
French has radically transformative sound changes, especially compared to other Romance languages such as Spanish, Portuguese, Italian and Romanian:

Latin	Written French	Spoken French	Italian	Catalan	Spanish	Portuguese	Romanian
canis "dog"	chien	/ʃjɛ̃/	cane	ca	can	cão	câine
octō "eight"	huit	/ɥit/	otto	vuit	ocho	oito	opt
pirum "pear"	poire	/pwaʁ/	pera	pera	pera	pera	pară
adiūtāre "to help"	aider	/ɛde/	aiutare	ajudar	ayudar	ajudar	ajuta
iacet "it lies (e.g. on the ground)"	gît	/ʒi/	giace	jeu	yace	jaz	zace

Extensive reduction in French: sapv̄tvm > su /sy/ "known"
Language	Change	Form	Pronun.
Classical Latin	–	sapv̄tvm	/saˈpuːtũː/
Vulgar Latin	Vowel length is replaced by vowel quality	sapv̄tvm	/saˈputũ/
Western Romance	vowel changes, first lenition	sabudo	/saˈbudo/
Gallo-Romance	loss of final vowels	sabud	/saˈbud/
	second lenition	savuḍ	/saˈvuð/
	final devoicing	savuṭ	/saˈvuθ/
	loss of /v/ near rounded vowel	seüṭ	/səˈuθ/
Old French	fronting of /u/	seüṭ	/səˈyθ/
	loss of dental fricatives	seü	/səˈy/
French	collapse of hiatus	su	/sy/

Extensive reduction in French: vītam > vie /vi/ "life"
Language	Change	Form	Pronun.
Classical Latin	–	vītam	/ˈwiːtãː/
Vulgar Latin	Vowel length is replaced by vowel quality	vītam	/ˈβitã/
Western Romance	vowel changes, first lenition	vida	/ˈvida/
Old French	second lenition, final /a/ lenition to /ə/	viḍe	/ˈviðə/
	loss of dental fricatives	vie	/ˈviə/
French	loss of final schwa	vie	/vi/

=== Vowels ===
The Vulgar Latin (Note: For the purposes of this article, "Vulgar Latin" refers specifically to the spoken Latin that underlies French, Spanish, Italian and Portuguese, which is technically termed Proto-Italo-Western-Romance.) underlying French and most other Romance languages had seven vowels in stressed syllables (/a ɛ e i ɔ o u/, which are similar to the vowels of American English pat/pot pet pate peat caught coat coot respectively), and five in unstressed syllables (/a e i o u/). Portuguese and Italian largely preserve that system, and Spanish has innovated only in converting /ɛ/ to /je/ and /ɔ/ to /we/, which resulted in a simple five-vowel system /a e i o u/. In French, however, numerous sound changes resulted in a system with 12–14 oral vowels and 3–4 nasal vowels (see French phonology).

Perhaps the most salient characteristic of French vowel history is the development of a strong stress accent, which is usually ascribed to the influence of the Germanic languages. It has led to the disappearance of most unstressed vowels and to pervasive differences in the pronunciation of stressed vowels in syllables that were open or closed syllables (a closed syllable is here a syllable that was followed by two or more consonants in Vulgar Latin, and an open syllable was followed by at most one consonant). It is commonly thought that stressed vowels in open syllables were lengthened, and most of the long vowels were then turned into diphthongs. The loss of unstressed vowels, particularly those after the stressed syllable, ultimately produced the situation in Modern French in which the accent is uniformly found on the last syllable of a word. (Conversely, Modern French has a stress accent that is quite weak, with little difference between the pronunciation of stressed and unstressed vowels.)

==== Unstressed vowels ====
Vulgar Latin had five vowels in unstressed syllables: /a e i o u/. When they occurred word-finally, all were lost in Old French except for /a/, which turned into a schwa (written e):

Latin	Vulgar Latin	French
factam "done (fem.)"	/fákta/	faite
noctem "night"	/nɔ́kte/	nuit
dīxī "I said"	/díksi/	dis
octō "eight"	/ɔ́kto/	huit
factvm "done (masc.)"	/fáktu/	fait

A final schwa also developed when the loss of a final vowel produced a consonant cluster that was then unpronounceable word-finally, usually consisting of a consonant followed by l, r, m or n (VL = Vulgar Latin, OF = Old French):

- popvlvm "people" > peuple
- inter "between" > VL */entre/ > entre
- patrem "father" > père (Note: Note that a final schwa appears even though the t was eventually lost.)
- asinvm "donkey" > OF asne > âne
- insvlam "island" > OF isle > île

The final schwa was eventually lost as well but has left its mark in the spelling and in the pronunciation of final consonants, which normally remain pronounced if a schwa followed but are often lost otherwise: fait "done (masc.)" /fɛ/ vs. faite "done (fem.)" /fɛt/.

Intertonic vowels (unstressed vowels in interior syllables) were lost entirely except for a in a syllable preceding the stress, which (originally) became a schwa. The stressed syllable is underlined in the Latin examples:

- popvlvm "people" > peuple
- asinvm "donkey, ass" > OF asne > âne
- angelvm "angel" > ange
- presbyter "priest" > VL */prɛ́sbetre/ > OF prestre > prêtre
- qvattvordecim "fourteen" > VL */kwattɔ́rdetsi/ > quatorze
- Stephanvm "Stephen" > VL */estɛ́fanu/ > OF Estievne > Étienne
- septimānam "week" > VL */settemána/ > semaine
- *parabolāre "to speak" > VL */parauláre/ > parler
- sacramentvm "sacrament" > OF sairement > serment "oath" (Note: The word has been respelled in Modern French, but the Old French result shows that a in an intertonic syllable preceding the stress was originally preserved as a schwa.)
- adiv̄tāre "to help" > aider
- disiēiv̄nāre "to break one's fast" > OF disner > dîner "to dine"

==== Stressed vowels ====
As noted above, stressed vowels developed quite differently depending on whether they occurred in an open syllable (followed by at most one consonant) or a closed syllable (followed by two or more consonants). In open syllables, the Vulgar Latin mid vowels /ɛ e ɔ o/ all diphthongized, becoming Old French ie oi ue eu respectively (ue and eu later merged), while Vulgar Latin /a/ was raised to Old French e. In closed syllables, all Vulgar Latin vowels originally remained unchanged, but eventually, /e/ merged into /ɛ/, /u/ became the front rounded vowel /y/ and /o/ was raised to /u/. (The last two changes occurred unconditionally, in both open and closed and in both stressed and unstressed syllables.)

This table shows the outcome of stressed vowels in open syllables:

Vulgar Latin	Old French	Modern French spelling	Modern French pronunciation	Examples
/a/	e	e, è	/e/, /ɛ/	mare "sea" > mer, talem "such" > tel, nāsvm "nose" > nez, natvm "born" > né
/ɛ/	ie	ie	/je/, /jɛ/	heri "yesterday" > hier, *melem "honey" > miel, pedem "foot" > pied
/e/	oi	oi	/wa/	pēra pear > poire, pilvm "hair" > poil, viam "way" > voie
/i/	i	i	/i/	fīlvm "wire" > fil, vīta "life" > vie
/ɔ/	ue	eu, œu	/ø/, /œ/	*corem "heart" > OF cuer > cœur, novvm "new" > OF nuef > neuf
/o/	eu	eu, œu	/ø/, /œ/	hōra "hour" > heure, gvla "throat" > gueule
/u/	u	u	/y/	dv̄rvm "hard" > dur

This table shows the outcome of stressed vowels in closed syllables:

Vulgar Latin	Old French	Modern French spelling	Modern French pronunciation	Examples
/a/	a	a	/a/	partem "part" > part, carrvm "carriage" > char, vaccam "cow" > vache
/ɛ/	e	e	/ɛ/	terram "land" > terre, septem "seven" > VL /sɛtte/ > OF set > sept /sɛt/ (Note: The p is etymological only.)
/e/	e	e	/ɛ/	siccvm dry > sec
/i/	i	i	/i/	vīllam "estate" > ville "town"
/ɔ/	o	o	/ɔ/, /o/	portum "port" > port, sottvm "foolish" > sot
/o/	o	ou	/u/	cvrtvm "short" > court, gvttam "drop (of liquid)" > OF gote > goutte
/u/	u	u	/y/	nv̄llvm "none" > nul

==== Nasal vowels ====
Latin n that ended up not followed by a vowel after the loss of vowels in unstressed syllables was ultimately absorbed into the preceding vowel, which produced a series of nasal vowels. The developments are somewhat complex (even more so when a palatal element is also present in the same cluster, as in punctum "point, dot" > point /pwɛ̃/). There are two separate cases, depending on whether the n originally stood between vowels or next to a consonant (whether a preceding stressed vowel developed in an open syllable or closed syllable context, respectively). See the article on the phonological history of French for full details.

==== Long vowels ====
Latin s before a consonant ultimately was absorbed into the preceding vowel, which produced a long vowel (indicated in Modern French spelling with a circumflex accent). For the most part, the long vowels are no longer pronounced distinctively long in Modern French (although long ê is still distinguished in Quebec French). In most cases, the formerly-long vowel is pronounced identically to the formerly short vowel (mur "wall" and mûr "mature" are pronounced the same), but some pairs are distinguished by their quality (o /ɔ/ vs. ô /o/).

A separate later vowel lengthening operates allophonically in Modern French and lengthens vowels before the final voiced fricatives /v z ʒ ʁ vʁ/ (e.g. paix /pɛ/ "peace" vs. pair [pɛːʁ] "even").

==== Effect of palatalised consonants ====
Late Vulgar Latin of the French area had a full complement of palatalised consonants, and more developed over time. Most of them, if preceded by a vowel, caused a /j/ sound (a palatal approximant, as in the English words you or yard) to appear before them, which combined with the vowel to produce a diphthong and eventually developed in various complex ways. A /j/ also appeared after them if they were originally followed by certain stressed vowels in open syllables (specifically, /a/ or /e/). If the appearance of the /j/ sound produced a triphthong, the middle vowel was dropped.

Examples show the various sources of palatalized consonants:

1. From Latin e or i in hiatus:
  - bassiāre "to lower" > VL */bassʲare/ > OF baissier > baisser (Note: Here, /j/ appeared both before and after the palatalized sound, but Old French infinitives in -ier were later converted to end in -er.)
  - palātium "palace" > VL */palatsʲu/ > palais
2. From Latin c or g followed by a front vowel (i.e. e or i):
  - pācem "peace" > VL */patsʲe/ > paix
  - cēra "wax" > VL */tsʲera/ > */tsjejra/ > cire (Note: Stressed /e/ in an open syllable normally developed to Early Old French ei and later oi. In this case, however, the /j/ produced by Vulgar Latin /tsʲ/ produced a triphthong /jej/, which was simplified to /i/ by dripping the middle vowel /e/.)
3. From Latin sequences such as ct, x, gr:
  - factvm "done" > Western Vulgar Latin */fajtʲu/ > fait
  - laxāre "to release" > Western Vulgar Latin */lajsʲare/ > OF laissier > laisser "to let" (Note: See the note above about baisser.)
  - nigrvm "black" > Western Vulgar Latin */nejrʲu/ > Early Old French neir > noir (Note: The resulting sequence ei developed the same way as ei from the stressed open /e/.)
  - noctem "night" > Western Vulgar Latin */nɔjtʲe/ > */nwɔjtʲe/ > */nujtʲe/ nuit (Note: VL /ɔ/ normally became diphthongal /wɔ/ in open syllables and later Old French ue. However, the diphthongization of /ɔ/ and /ɛ/ also occurred in closed syllables when a palatalized consonant followed, and the resulting triphthong was simplified by dropping the middle vowel.)
4. From Latin c or g followed by /a/ except after a vowel:
  - canem "dog" > pre-French */tʃʲane/ > chien
  - carricāre "to load" > Western Vulgar Latin */karregare/ > */kargare/ > pre-French */tʃʲardʒʲare/ > OF chargier
5. From Latin consonantal i:
  - pēior /pejjor/ "worse" > Western Vulgar Latin */pɛjrʲe/ > pre-French */pjɛjrʲe > pire (Note: The triphthong reduction here produced /i/ by deleting the middle vowel /ɛ/.)
  - iacet "he lies (on the ground)" > pre-French */dʒʲatsʲet/ > */dʒjajtst/ > OF gist > gît (Note: The triphthong resulted from the combined effects of the two palatalised consonants and was then reduced to /i/ by dropping the middle vowel /a/.)

==== Effect of l ====
In Old French, l before a consonant became u and produced new diphthongs, which eventually resolved into monophthongs: falsam "false" > fausse /fos/. See the article on the phonological history of French for details.

=== Consonants ===
The sound changes involving consonants are less striking than those involving vowels. In some ways, French is actually relatively conservative. For example, it preserves initial pl-, fl-, cl-, unlike Spanish, Portuguese and Italian: plovēre "to rain" > pleuvoir (Spanish llover, Portuguese chover, Italian piovere).

==== Lenition ====
Consonants between vowels were subject to a process called lenition, a type of weakening. That was more extensive in French than in Spanish, Portuguese or Italian. For example, /t/ between vowels went through the following stages in French: /t/ > /d/ > /ð/ > no sound. However, in Spanish only the first two changes happened; in Brazilian Portuguese, only the first change happened, and in Italian, no change happened. Compare vītam "life" > vie with Italian vita, Portuguese vida, Spanish vida [biða]. This table shows the outcomes:

Vulgar Latin	French	Examples
/t/, /d/	no sound	vītam "life" > vie; cadēre "to fall" > OF cheoir > choir
/k/, /g/	/j/ or no sound	pacāre "to pay" > payer; locāre "to put, to lease" > louer "to rent"
/p/, /b/, /f/, /v/	/v/ or no sound	*sapēre "to be wise" > savoir "to know"; dēbēre "to have to" > devoir; *sapv̄tvm "known" > OF seü > su
/s/	/z/	cavsam "cause" > chose "thing"
/tsʲ/	/z/	potiōnem "drink" > VL */potsʲone/ > poison "poison"

==== Palatalization ====
As described above, Late Vulgar Latin of the French area had an extensive series of palatalized consonants that developed from numerous sources. The resulting sounds tended to drop a /j/ before and/or after them, which formed diphthongs that later developed in complex ways.

Latin e and i in hiatus position (directly followed by another vowel) developed into /j/ in Vulgar Latin and then combined with the preceding consonant to form a palatalized consonant. All consonants could be palatalized in that fashion. The resulting consonants developed as follows (some developed differently when they became final as a result of the early loss of the following vowel):

Vulgar Latin	French, non-final	French, final	Examples
*/tj/ > */tsʲ/	(i)s		potiōnem "drink" > poison "poison"; palātivm "palace" > palais
*/kj/, */ttj/, */kkj/, */ktj/ > */ttsʲ/	c, ss	OF z > s	*faciam "face" > face; bracchivm "arm" > OF braz > bras, *pettiam "piece" > pièce, *dīrectiāre "to set, to erect" > OF drecier > dresser (Note: Note that no /j/ was dropped before the palatalized consonant in this case.)
*/dj/, */gj/ > */jj/	i		*gavdiam "joy" > joie; medivm "middle" > mi; exagium "balance" > essai
*/sʲ/	(i)s		basiāre "to kiss" > baiser
*/ssʲ/	(i)ss	(i)s	bassiāre "to lower" > baisser
*/lʲ/	ill	il	paleam "straw" > paille; *tripālivm "instrument of torture" > travail "work" (Note: No /j/ was dropped before the palatalized consonant; the i in il(l) is purely a spelling construct, which probably stems from the consonant originally being pronounced geminated, as it still is in modern Italian.)
*/nʲ/	gn	(i)n	*montāneam "mountainous" > montagne "mountain"; balnevm "bath" > VL */banju/ > bain (Note: No /j/ was dropped before the palatalized consonant except word-finally, which probably stems from the consonant originally being pronounced geminated, as it still is in modern Italian.)
*/rʲ/	(i)r or (ie)r (Note: A /j/ was dropped before the consonant as expected except that VL */arʲ/ > ier.)		āream "threshing floor, open space" > aire; operārivm "worker" > ouvrier
*/mʲ/, */mnʲ/ (Note: VL mn simplified to m (in contrast to other Western Romance languages which generally merge it with the outcome of nn), so these two had the same outcome under palatalization.)	ng /◌̃ʒ/	?	vīndēmia "vintage" > OF vendenge > vendange; somniāre "to dream" > OF songier > songer
*/pʲ/	ch /ʃ/	?	sapiam "I may be wise" > (je) sache "I may know"
*/bʲ/, */vʲ/, */fʲ/	g /ʒ/		*rabiam "rage" > rage; rvbevm "red" > rouge

c followed by e or i developed into Vulgar Latin */tsʲ/, which was lenited to */dzʲ/ between vowels (later -is-). The pronunciation /ts/ was still present in Old French but was later simplified to /s/:

- centvm "hundred" > cent
- placēre "to please" > plaisir "pleasure"
- pācem "peace" > OF pais > paix

g before e or i developed originally into Vulgar Latin */j/, which subsequently became /dʒʲ/ when it was not between vowels. The pronunciation /dʒ/ was still present in Old French but was later simplified to /ʒ/. Between vowels, /j/ often disappeared:

- gentēs "people" > gents > gents
- rēgīna "queen" > OF reïne > reine
- quadrāgintā "forty" > quarante
- legere "to read" > pre-French */ljɛjrʲe/ > lire (Note: See above.)

c and g before a except after a vowel developed into /tʃʲ/ and /dʒʲ/, respectively. Both /tʃ/ and /dʒ/ persisted the Old French but were later subsequently simplified to /ʃ/ and /ʒ/:

- carrvm "chariot" > char
- gambam "leg" > jambe
- manicam "sleeve" > */manka/ > manche
- siccam "dry (fem.)" > sèche

In various consonant combinations involving c or g + another consonant, the c or g developed into /j/, which proceeded to palatalize the following consonant:

- factvm "done" > fait
- laxāre "to release" > OF laissier "to let" > laisser
- vetvlam "old" > veclam > OF vieille
- articvlvm "joint" > VL */arteklu/ > orteil "toe"
- vigilāre "to keep watch" > OF veillier > veiller

In some cases, the loss of an intertonic vowel led to a similar sequence of /j/ or palatalized consonant + another consonant, which was palatalized in turn:

- medietātem "half" > */mejjetate/ > */mejtʲat/ > moitié
- cōgitāre "to think" >> *cv̄gitāre > */kujetare/ > Western Vulgar Latin */kujedare/ > pre-French */kujdʲare/ > OF cuidier > cuider
- *mānsiōnātam "household" > OF maisniée
- *impēiorāre "to worsen" > OF empoirier

==== Changes to final consonants ====
As a result of the pre-French loss of most final vowels, all consonants could appear word-finally except /tʃ/ and /dʒ/, which were always followed by at least a schwa, stemming from either a final /a/ or a prop vowel. In Old French, however, all underlying voiced stops and fricatives were pronounced voiceless word-finally. That was clearly reflected in Old French spelling: the adjectives froit "cold" (feminine froide), vif "lively" (feminine vive), larc "large" (feminine large) and the verbs, je doif "I must" vs. ils doivent "they must", je lef "I may wash" vs. ils levent "they (may) wash". Most of the alternations have since disappeared (partly because of morphological reshaping and partly because of respelling once most final consonants had been lost, as described below), but the adjectival alternation vif vs. vive (and similarly for other adjectives in -f) has remained.

In the Middle French, most final consonants became gradually lost. That proceeded in stages:

1. The loss of final consonants when appearing before another word beginning with a consonant. This stage is preserved in the words six and dix, which are pronounced /sis/ /dis/ standing alone but /si/ /di/ before a word beginning with a consonant and /siz/ /diz/ before a word beginning with a vowel. If the word ended in a stressed vowel followed by /s/ (as, for example, in plurals), the same process apparently operated as elsewhere when an /s/ preceded a consonant, with a long vowel resulting. (This situation is still found, for example, in Jèrriais, a dialect of the Norman language, which preserves long vowels and has words ending in a vowel lengthening that vowel in the plural.)
2. Loss of final consonants before a pause. That left a two-way pronunciation for most words, with final consonants pronounced before a following vowel-initial word but not elsewhere, and is the origin of the modern phenomenon of liaison.
3. Loss of final consonants in all circumstances. The process is still ongoing, which causes a gradual loss of liaison, especially in informal speech, except in certain limited contexts and fixed expressions.

The final consonants that are normally subject to loss are /t/, /s/, /p/, sometimes /k/ and /r/, rarely /f/ (in clé < the earlier and still occasional clef). The consonants /l/ and /ʎ/ were normally preserved, but /m/, /n/, /ɲ/ and /ʃ/ did not occur (the voiced obstruents /d z b g v ʒ/ also did not occur). A more recent countervailing tendency, however, is the restoration of some formerly-lost final consonants, as in sens, now pronounced /sɑ̃s/ but formerly /sɑ̃/, as still found in the expressions sens dessus dessous "upside down" and sens devant derrière "back to front". The restored consonant may stem from the liaison pronunciation or the spelling, and it serves to reduce ambiguity. For example, /sɑ̃/ is also the pronunciation of cent "hundred", sang "blood" and sans "without" (among others).

== Effect of substrate and superstrate languages ==
French is noticeably different from most other Romance languages. Some of the changes have been attributed to substrate influence, which is from Gaulish (Celtic), or superstrate influence, which is from Frankish (Germanic). In practice, it is difficult to say with confidence which sound and grammar changes were caused by substrate and superstrate influences, since many of the changes in French have parallels in other Romance languages or are changes that are undergone by many languages in their process of development. However, the following are likely candidates.

In phonology:

- The reintroduction of the consonant /h/ at the beginning of a word is caused by Frankish influence and occurs mostly in words borrowed from Germanic. The sound no longer exists in Standard Modern French (it survives dialectally, particularly in the regions of Normandy, Picardy, Wallonia and Louisiana), but a Germanic h usually disallows liaison: les halles /le.al/, les haies /le.ɛ/, les haltes /le.alt/, but a Latin h allows liaison: les herbes /lezɛrb/, les hôtels /lezotɛl/.
- The reintroduction of /w/ in Northern Norman, Picard, Walloon, Champenois, Bourguignon and Bas-Lorrain is caused by Germanic influence. All Romance languages have borrowed Germanic words containing /w/, but all languages south of the isogloss, including the ancestor of Modern French ("Central French"), converted it to /ɡw/, which usually developed subsequently into /ɡ/. English has borrowed words from Norman French (1066 – c. 1200 AD) and Standard French (c. 1200–1400 AD), which sometimes results in doublets like warranty and guarantee or warden and guardian.
- The occurrence of an extremely-strong stress accent led to the loss of unstressed vowels and the extensive modification of stressed vowels (diphthongization), which is likely caused by Frankish influence and possibly Celtic influence since both languages had a strong initial stress (tela -> TEla -> toile) This feature also no longer exists in Modern French, but its influence remains in the uniform final word stress in Modern French since the strong stress caused all vowels after it to be ultimately lost.
- Nasalization resulting from compensatory vowel lengthening in stressed syllables was caused by Germanic and/or Celtic stress accent. Among Romance languages, it occurs primarily in French, Occitan, Arpitan and Portuguese, all of which have possible Celtic substratums. However, scattered dialects of Romance languages, including Sardinian, Spanish and Lombard, also have the phenomenon as an allophonic (though not phonemic) property. Among the four Romance languages in which it is prominent beyond divergent dialects, the only one for which it is undebatably phonemic is French
- The development of front-rounded vowels /y/, /ø/, and /œ/ may be caused by Germanic influence, as few Romance languages other than French have such vowels, but Gallo-Romance languages have them and share a Germanic influence. At least one sound, /y/, still exists in Celtic languages. A number of other scholars, most famously including Romance linguist Ascoli, have attributed the French sound to the Celtic substratum. The attribution of the sounds to Celtic influence actually predates the emergence of academic linguistics as early as the 1500s, when it was attested as being called "Gaulish u". Among Romance languages, its distribution strongly correspondent with areas of suspected Celtic substratum: French, Arpitan, Occitan, Romansch and Gallo-Italic dialects, along with some dialects of Portuguese. The change may have occurred around the same time as a similar fronting of long [u] to [y] in the British Celtic languages. On the other hand, scholars such as Posner and Meyer-Lübke acknowledge the possibility of Celtic influence but see the development as internally motivated.
- The lenition of intervocalic consonants (see above) may be caused by Celtic influence. A similar change happened in Celtic languages about the same time, and the demarcation between Romance dialects with and without this change (the La Spezia–Rimini Line) corresponds closely to the limit of Celtic settlement in ancient Rome. The lenition also affected words that were borrowed from Germanic (haïr < hadir < *hatjan; flan < *fladon; (cor)royer < *(ga)rēdan; etc.), which suggests that the tendency persisted for some time after it had been introduced.
- The devoicing of word-final voiced consonants in Old French was caused by Germanic influence (e.g. grant/grande, blont/blonde, bastart/bastarde).

In other areas:

- Various words may have shifted gender under the influence from words of the same meaning or with a similar sound in Gaulish, as a result of the Celtic substrate. A connectionist model predicting shifts in gender assignment for common nouns more accurately predicted historical developments when the Gaulish genders of the same words were considered in the model. The loss of the neuter may have been accelerated in French also because Gaulish neuters were very hard to distinguish and were possibly lost earlier than Latin neuters. In comparison, Romanian retains the neuter gender and Italian retains it for a couple of words. Portuguese, Sardinian, Catalan and Spanish also retain remnants of the neuter outside nouns in demonstrative pronouns and the like, but they have lost the neuter for nouns.
- The development of verb-second syntax in Old French in which the verb must come in the second position in a sentence, regardless of whether the subject precedes or follows the verb, was probably caused by Germanic influence.
- The first-person plural ending -ons (Old French -omes, -umes) is likely derived from the Frankish termination -ōmês, -umês (vs. Latin -āmus, -ēmus, -imus, and -īmus; cf. OHG -ōmēs, -umēs).
- The use of the letter k in Old French, which was replaced by c and qu during the Renaissance, was caused by Germanic influence. Typically, k was not used in Latin and other Romance languages. Similarly, the use of w and y also diminished.
- The impersonal pronoun on "one, you, they" but more commonly replacing nous "we" (or "us") in colloquial French (first-person plural pronoun, see Ingvaeonic nasal spirant law), from Old French (h)om, a reduced form of homme "man", was a calque of the Germanic impersonal pronoun man "one, you, they" reduced form of mann "man" (cf Old English man "one, you, they", from mann "man"; German man "one, you, they" vs. Mann "man").
- The expanded use of avoir "to have" over the more customary use of tenir "to have, hold" in other Romance languages was likely the influence from the Germanic word for "have", which has a similar form (cf. Frankish *habēn, Gothic haban, Old Norse hafa, English have).
- The increased use of auxiliary verbal tenses, especially the passé composé, is probably caused by Germanic influence. Unknown in Classical Latin, the passé composé begins to appear in Old French in the early 13th century, after the Germanic and the Viking invasions. Its construction is identical to the one seen in all other Germanic languages at the time and earlier: "verb "be" (être) + past participle" when there is movement, indication of state or change of condition but ""have" (avoir) + past participle" for all other verbs. The passé composé is not universal to the Romance language family since only languages known to have Germanic superstrata display that type of construction, and they do so in varying degrees. The languages nearest to Germanic areas show constructions most similar to those seen in Germanic. Italian, Spanish and Catalan are other Romance languages with this type of compound verbal tense.
- The heightened frequency of si ("so") in Old French correlates to Old High German so and thanne; and the construction of French aussi (Old French ausi, alsi "in like manner") is likely a calque or borrowing of the Frankish *allswā (whence German also and English also).
- The tendency in Old French to use adverbs to complete the meaning of a verb, as in lever sur ("raise up"), monter en amont ("mount up"), aller avec ("go along/go with"), traire avant ("draw forward"), etc., is likely to be of Germanic origin.
- The lack of a future tense in conditional clauses is likely caused by Germanic influence.
- The reintroduction of a vigesimal system of counting by increments of 20 (soixante-dix "70" lit. "sixty-ten"; quatre-vingts "80" lit. "four-twenties"; quatre-vingt-dix "90" lit. "four-twenty-ten") is caused by North Germanic influence and first appeared in Normandy, in northern France. From there, it spread south after the formation of the French Republic and replaced the typical Romance forms, which are still used today in Belgian and Swiss French. The current vigesimal system was introduced by the Vikings and adopted by the Normans, who popularised its use (compare Danish tresindstyve, literally 3 times 20, or 60; English four score and seven for 87). Pre-Roman Celtic languages in Gaul also made use of a vigesimal system, but it largely vanished early in French linguistic history or became severely marginalised in its range. The Nordic vigesimal system may possibly derive ultimately from the Celtic. Old French also had treis vingts, cinq vingts (compare Welsh ugain "20", deugain "40", pedwar ugain "80", lit. "four-twenties").

== See also ==
- Gaulish
- History of the English language
- History of the Italian language
- History of the Portuguese language
- History of the Spanish language
- Influence of French on English
- Language policy in France
- List of French words of Germanic origin
- Old Frankish
- Old French
- Reforms of French orthography
- Vulgar Latin
- Canadian French
