= Bartsch's law =

Phonetic law affecting the langues d'oïl

In historical linguistics, Bartsch's law or the Bartsch effect (French: loi de Bartsch, pronounced [lwa də baʁtʃ] or effet de Bartsch) is the name of a sound change that took place in the early history of the langues d'oïl (c. 5th–6th centuries AD), for example in the development of Old French. It is named for the German medievalist Karl Bartsch.

== Description ==
Bartsch's law was a phonetic change affecting the open central vowel [a] in northern Gallo-Romance dialects in the 5th and 6th centuries. This vowel, inherited from Vulgar Latin, underwent fronting and closure in stressed open syllables when preceded by a palatal or palatalized consonant. The result of this process in Old French was the diphthong [ie]:

Latin laxāre /lakˈsaːre/ > Old French laissier [lajˈsier] (modern French laisser "let")
Latin cārum /ˈkaːrum/ > Old French chier [ˈtʃier] (modern French cher, Walloon tchîr "dear")

Note that [ie] is also the outcome of the diphthongization of [ɛ] in stressed, open syllables:

Latin pedem /ˈpedem/ > [ˈpɛdɛ] > [ˈpieðɛ] > Old French pie [ˈpie] (modern French pied "foot")

The chronology of Bartsch's law relative to the more general diphthongization of [a] to [aɛ] (responsible, for example, for the final vowels in mare > mer "sea" or portāre > porter "carry") has not been conclusively established. According to one view, diphthongization took place first, and Bartsch's law is seen as a further segmentation of the diphthong [aɛ] caused by the preceding palatal/palatalized consonant, followed by simplification of the resulting triphthong:

IPA: [ˈa] > [ˈaɛ̯] > [ˈia̯ɛ̯] > [ˈiɛ̯] > [ˈie̯]
Romanicist notation: á > áę > íaę > íę > íẹ

According to a second view, Bartsch's law affected the simple vowel [a], causing it to change to [e], which then diphthongized to [ie]:

IPA: [a] > [e] > [ˈie̯]
Romanicist notation: a > ẹ > íẹ

Support for the second hypothesis comes the fact that palatal consonants triggered the same change [a] > [e] in unstressed word-initial syllables:

Latin caballum /kaˈballum/ > [tʃeˈvallo] > Old French cheval [tʃəˈval] "horse"

== Further development ==
Subsequent changes have obscured the effects of Bartsch's law in modern French. The accent shifted to the second element of the diphthong [ie], and the first element underwent glide formation:

in IPA: [ˈie̯] > [ˈi̯e] > [je]
in Romanist notation: íẹ > iẹ́ > yẹ

The glide [j] was then lost in most words, either absorbed by the preceding palatal consonant, or eliminated by analogical pressure (e.g. in many verbs of the -er conjugation):

Old French chier [ˈtʃier] > [ʃjer] > modern French cher [ʃɛr] "dear"
Old French laissier [lajˈsier] > [lajˈsjer] > modern French laisser [lɛˈse] or [leˈse] "let"

The glide was only retained if subsequent nasalization took place, as in Modern French chien [ʃjɛ̃] "dog" (not *chen *[ʃɛ̃] or *[ʃɑ̃]). Contrast Walloon tchén [tʃɛ̃].

Consequently, the vowel "e" in these words, which is due to Bartsch's law, is now indistinguishable from the "e" that resulted from the general diphthongization of [a] (as in the words mer "sea", porter "carry", mentioned above). The diphthong [ie] is still visible in the spelling of words like chien "dog" (< canem) and moitié "half" (< Proto-Western Romance [mejˈtade] < Latin medietātem).
