= Linguistic boundary of Moselle =

The linguistic boundary in the French department of Moselle (Lorraine region) is a subset of the wider Romance-Germanic language border that stretches through Belgium, France, Switzerland and Italy.

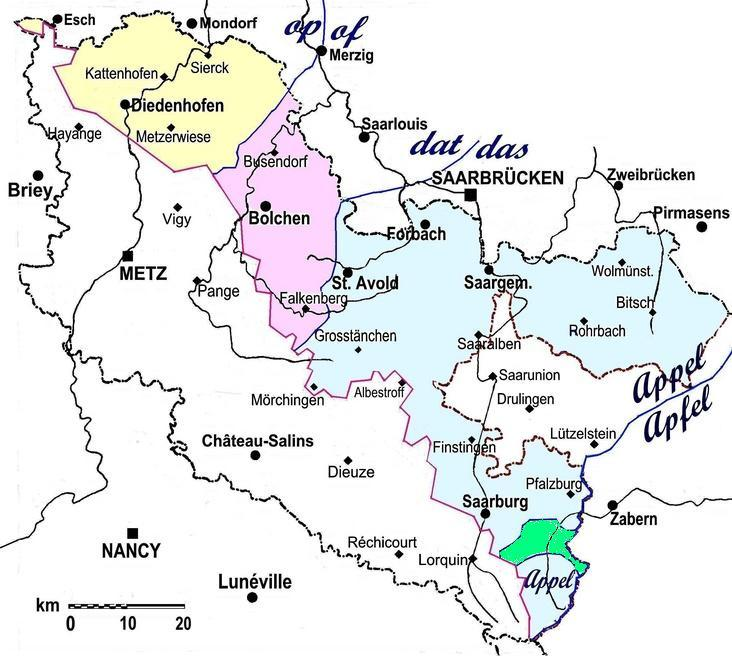

== Localities ==
At the end of the nineteenth century:

- German area : Rédange, Russange, Volmerange-les-Mines, Nondkeil, Rochonvillers, Angevillers, Algrange, Volkrange, Veymerange, Florange, across Suzange and Serémange-Erzange, across Uckange, Bertrange, Guénange, Volstroff, Luttange, Hombourg-Budange, across Ébersviller, Piblange, Drogny, Bockange, Rurange-lès-Mégange, Mégange, Guinkirchen, Brecklange, Volmerange-lès-Boulay, Loutremange, Helstroff, Brouck, Bannay, Morlange, Marange-Zondrange, Fouligny, Guinglange, Elvange, Créhange, Mainvillers, Faulquemont, Adelange, Eincheville, Viller, Harprich, Morhange, Racrange, Rodalbe, Bermering, Virming, Francaltroff, Léning, across Albestroff, Réning, Insming, Vittersbourg, Givrycourt, Munster, Lhor, Loudrefing, Mittersheim, Berthelming, Saint-Jean-de-Bassel, Gosselming, Haut-Clocher, Langatte, Sarrebourg, Buhl-Lorraine, Schneckenbusch, Brouderdorff, Plaine-de-Walsch, Hartzviller, Troisfontaines, Walscheid, Soldatenthal, Wassersoupe.
- French/Romanic area : Audun-le-Tiche, Ottange, Bure, Tressange, Havange, Fontoy, Nilvange, Marspich, across Suzange and Serémange-Erzange, Rémelange, Fameck, across Uckange, Richemont, Bousse, Rurange-lès-Thionville, Montrequienne, Mancy, Altroff, Aboncourt, Saint-Bernard, Villers-Bettnach, Burtoncourt, Nidange, Épange, Hinckange, Northen, Condé, Varize, Vaudoncourt, Bionville-sur-Nied, Raville, Servigny-lès-Raville, Hémilly, Arriance, Many, Thonville, Suisse, Landroff, Baronville, Rhode, Pévange, Zarbeling, Lidrezing, Bénestroff, Vahl-lès-Bénestroff, Montdidier, across Albestroff, Torcheville, Guinzeling, Lostroff, Cutting, Rorbach-lès-Dieuze, Angviller-lès-Bisping, Bisping, Desseling, Fribourg, Rhodes, Kerprich-aux-Bois, Bébing, Imling, Hesse, Nitting, Voyer, Abreschviller.

Former boundary (1630)

== See also ==
- Linguistic boundary of Brittany
