= Abreschviller =

- Commune
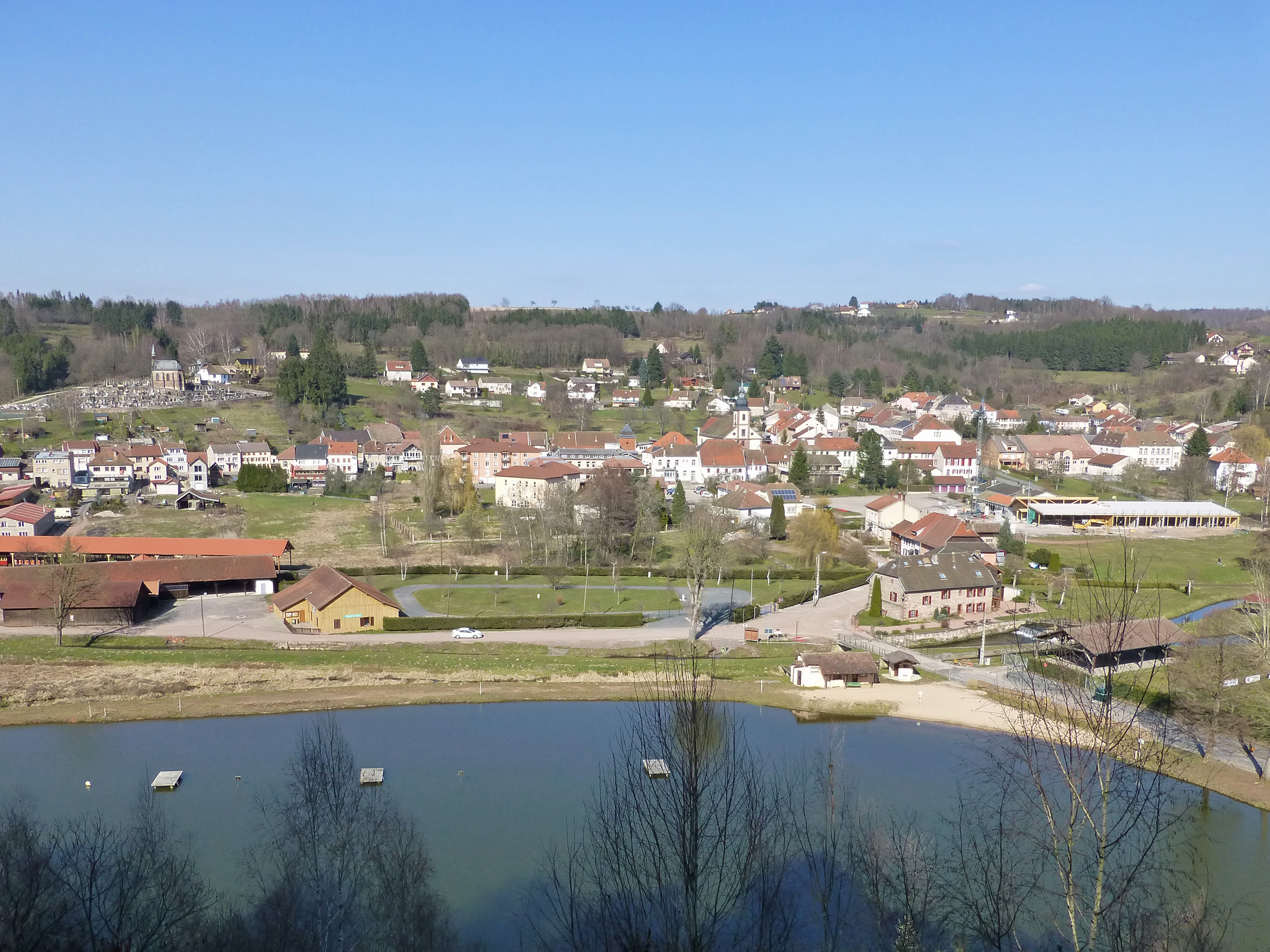
- A general view of Abreschviller

- Coat of arms
- Location of Abreschviller
- Location within France Location within Grand Est
- Coordinates: 48°38′16″N 7°05′51″E
- Country: France
- Region: Grand Est
- Department: Moselle
- Arrondissement: Sarrebourg-Château-Salins
- Canton: Phalsbourg
- Intercommunality: Sarrebourg-Moselle Sud

Government
  - Mayor (2020–2026): Emmanuel Riehl
- Area^{1}: 41.29 km^{2} (15.94 sq mi)
- Elevation: 350 m (1,150 ft)
- Highest elevation: 986 m (3,235 ft)
- Lowest elevation: 273 m (896 ft)
- Population (2023): 1,428
  - Density: 34.58/km^{2} (89.57/sq mi)
- Demonym(s): Abreschvillois, Abreschvilloises
- Time zone: UTC+01:00 (CET)
  - Summer (DST): UTC+02:00 (CEST)
- INSEE/Postal code: 57003 /57560
- ^{1} French Land Register data, which excludes lakes, ponds, glaciers > 1 km^{2} (0.386 sq mi or 247 acres) and river estuaries.

Abreschviller (French pronunciation: [abʁɛʃvilɛʁ]; German: Alberschweiler) is a commune in the Moselle department in Grand Est in northeastern France.

== Geography ==
Abreschviller is a small, long-drawn-out, village in the Vosges mountains, surrounded by vast forests. It is located 15 kilometers south of Sarrebourg, and 25 kilometers from Phalsbourg, at the border between Lorraine and Alsace.

The village is crossed by the Red Saar. The highest point of the commune is the Grossmann forest house at 968 meters above sea level.

== History ==
The origin of this village is rather recent. However this location was populated since the Antiquity.

In 1660, there were only 48 houses there.

The counts of Dabo (or Dachsbourg), with the concessions they granted them, the rights to exploit the forests of their domain, attracted French families who built houses on the banks of the Red Saar and populated Abreschviller gradually.

In the course of the 17th and 18th centuries, fifteen sawmills and two paper mills were built on the village territory.

=== Chèchs ===
Many workers came from all over the region to work in the forest of Abreschviller. They arrived on Monday and left on Saturday.

The forestry workers were called the "Chèchs" (the bags). The population recognized them, when they crossed the numerous villages before reaching Abreschviller, since they were used to walking with a stick and carrying their week's supply bag in an original way. Hence the name "Chèchs" (the bags).

== Population ==
Historical population

Year	Pop.	±% p.a.
1793	1,302	—
1800	1,248	−0.60%
1806	1,607	+4.30%
1821	1,771	+0.65%
1831	1,915	+0.78%
1836	1,980	+0.67%
1841	2,082	+1.01%
1846	1,936	−1.44%
1851	1,867	−0.72%
1856	1,659	−2.33%
1861	1,737	+0.92%
1871	1,679	−0.34%
1875	1,568	−1.70%
1880	1,563	−0.06%
1885	1,444	−1.57%
1890	1,399	−0.63%
1895	1,537	+1.90%
1900	1,573	+0.46%

Year	Pop.	±% p.a.
1905	1,527	−0.59%
1910	1,525	−0.03%
1921	1,355	−1.07%
1926	1,299	−0.84%
1931	1,268	−0.48%
1936	1,271	+0.05%
1946	1,419	+1.11%
1954	1,459	+0.35%
1962	1,353	−0.94%
1968	1,421	+0.82%
1975	1,381	−0.41%
1982	1,309	−0.76%
1990	1,233	−0.74%
1999	1,285	+0.46%
2007	1,486	+1.83%
2012	1,527	+0.55%
2017	1,427	−1.35%
2023	1,428	+0.01%

Source: EHESS (1793-1999) and INSEE

== Sights ==
=== Civilian and industrial buildings ===
- Forest railway: this small tourist train, linking the center of the village to the hamlet of Grand-Soldat, welcomes about 30 000 tourists per year.

=== Historical monuments ===
- Old castle: vestiges of a feudal castle having belonged to the counts of Dabo. Located on the rock of Schlossfels, in the Streitwald forest.
- Franco-German military cemetery.
- Devil's rock: a remarkable sand-stone rock with a sculpture of the devil on it. It is surrounded by many folk tales.

== Cultural events and festivities ==
The Abreschviller - Saint-Quirin hill climb race takes place every year at the end of April, or the beginning of May.

== Notable people ==
Alexandre Chatrian (1826-1890): He was a French writer, known for his literary collaboration with Emile Erckmann. Alexandre Chatrian was born in Abreschviller.

Pierre Marie Bournique (1888-1911): He was also known as Pierre Marie. He was born in Abreschviller and was a pilot from Lorraine as well as a pioneer of French aviation.

== See also ==
- Communes of the Moselle department
