= Linguistic boundary of Brittany =

Language border

Lower Brittany (in various colours) and Upper Brittany in grey

The language boundary in Brittany is the language border between the part of Brittany where Breton (a Celtic language) is spoken and the area in Brittany where Gallo (a Romance language) is spoken. The existence of this linguistic border led to differentiate the Celtic-speaking Lower Brittany (West) from the Romance-speaking Upper Brittany (East).

The farthest eastern extension of the Breton language was in the ninth century, when the linguistic border was located near Nantes and Rennes. Breton declined inexorably in favor of the Gallo gradually moving westward along a Binic-Guérande line. The border can now be traced along a line from Plouha to Rhuys. The linguistic unification of France, completed after World War II, made somewhat obsolete the linguistic aspect of the distinction between Upper and Lower Brittany, although many people still consider it valid in terms of toponymy, culture and identity.

== History ==
Decline of the Breton language from the 10th to the 20th century.

Place-names are one form of evidence for the linguistic boundary during the Early Middle Ages, suggesting that it was much farther to the east than it is now, near Nantes and Rennes. For example, Pleugueneuc, in Ille-et-Vilaine, combines the Breton element plou (parish) with the name 'Guehenoc'.

The distinction of two Brittanys was made at least as early as the 15th century, when the names used were Britannia gallicana (Gallic Brittany) and Britannia britonizans (Brittonic Brittany). At that time, it appears that Lower Brittany had a separate fiscal status. Since then, the boundary between them has changed slowly as a result of the long retreat of the Breton language.

Under the ancien régime, the boundary between the two was generally in line with the province's division into nine bishoprics, with those of Rennes, Dol, Nantes, St Malo and St Brieuc considered to form Upper Brittany, while Tréguier, Vannes, Quimper and Saint-Pol-de-Léon formed Lower Brittany.

In 1588, the historian Bertrand d'Argentré defined the boundary as running from the outskirts of Binic southwards to Guérande, leaving the towns of Loudéac, Josselin, and Malestroit in Upper Brittany. In 1886, Paul Sébillot noted that the boundary was deeper into what had been Breton territory, the line then running from Plouha on the north coast to Batz-sur-Mer in the south, on the Bay of Biscay.

The boundary between 'Upper' and 'Lower' Brittany is now a purely imaginary line and has no administrative or other status. However, having been based on linguistic areas, the boundary does correspond very roughly to administrative borders. The town of Ploërmel is one point where the two meet.

In area, Upper Brittany now takes in something over half of the 35,000 square kilometres of the whole of Brittany, but it has some 2.5 million people, compared with Lower Brittany's 1.6 million. In the early 20th century, about 60% of the population had lived in the Breton-speaking areas.

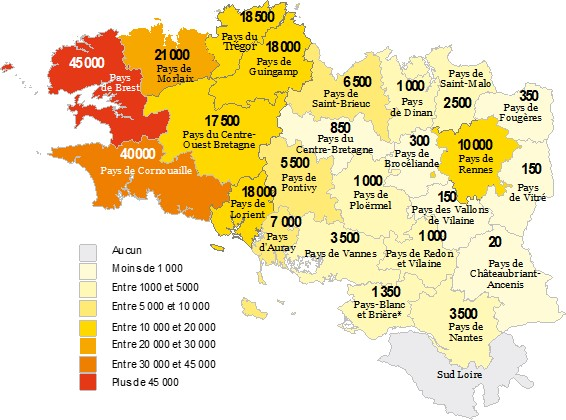

== See also ==
- Linguistic boundary of Moselle
