= Gallo language =

Oïl language spoken in eastern Brittany, France

Gallo
- Galo
- Native to: France
- Region: Upper Brittany (Côtes-d'Armor, Ille-et-Vilaine, Loire-Atlantique, Morbihan) and parts of Anjou and Maine (Mayenne and Maine-et-Loire)
- Native speakers: from 29,060 (est. 1999) to 200,000 (est. 2008; 2013); 197,000 (est. 2018); 132,000 (est. 2024)
- Language family: Indo-European: Italic; Latino-Faliscan; Latin; Romance; Italo-Western; Western; Gallo-Iberian?; Gallo-Romance; Gallo-Rhaetian?; Arpitan–Oïl; Oïl; Armorican zone; Gallo
- Writing system: Latin script

Language codes
- ISO 639-3: –
- ELP: Gallo
- Linguasphere: 51-AAA-hb
- IETF: fr-gallo

Gallo (endonym galo) is one of the Oïl languages spoken in Upper Brittany, in western France. It is traditionally spoken in Ille-et-Vilaine, Loire-Atlantique, and the eastern parts of Morbihan and Côtes-d'Armor, on the eastern side of the Breton linguistic boundary running roughly from Plouha to the Pénerf river. The eastern limit of Gallo is less clearly defined, owing to the existence of a dialect continuum with neighboring Oïl languages such as Mayennais, Norman, and Angevin. Some linguists therefore consider Gallo to extend into areas adjacent to historic Brittany, particularly within the broader region of the Armorican Massif.

Because there are no universally accepted criteria for distinguishing languages from dialects, there is no full consensus regarding the status of Gallo. Although it is primarily an oral language, it has been the subject of academic research and standardization efforts, and books in Gallo are published on a regular basis. Unlike Breton, however, Gallo does not benefit from a long tradition of political or institutional advocacy. Both languages were nevertheless jointly recognized as "languages of Brittany" by the Regional Council of Brittany in 2004.

As a Romance language, Gallo is very different from Breton, which is a Celtic language. Speakers are referred to as gallésants or Gallo speakers. The term "Gallo" originates from the Breton language; its use by speakers themselves is relatively recent, although it is attested in the press as early as the beginning of the 20th century. Many speakers simply use the term "patois", although this label is often regarded as pejorative.

Despite some initiatives to promote the teaching of Gallo in schools and universities, the language is endangered. Speakers are generally elderly, and intergenerational transmission is very weak. Gallo is classified as seriously endangered by UNESCO. Estimates of the number of speakers vary widely, with between 3 percent and 8 percent of the local population reported as being able to speak the language.

== Definition ==
=== Names ===
Upper Brittany, shown in blue, separated from Lower Brittany by the Breton linguistic boundary as it stood in 1952.

The term Gallo derives from the Breton word gall, meaning "foreigner (of a Romance-speaking background)", itself originating from a Celtic root.

The term can be compared with the Scottish Gaelic word gall, which also means "foreigner", and more specifically "a Scot who does not speak Gaelic" or "an inhabitant of southern Scotland", where the traditional language is Scots rather than Scottish Gaelic.

The feminine form "gallèse" derives from the Breton gallez, the feminine form of gall. The Trésor de la langue française records several derived variants, including "gallot", "gallec", "gallek", "gallais", "gallic", and "gallou", as well as the feminine "gallote". These terms may refer not only to the language itself, but also to people from Upper Brittany and to cultural features associated with the language and its speakers.

The term gallo was initially used by Breton speakers, which partly explains why it has historically been little used by Gallo speakers themselves. A survey conducted in 1986 by Henriette Walter showed that only slightly more than 4 percent of speakers in the Côtes-d'Armor reported having always used the term, and that about one third of them perceived it as carrying a rather pejorative meaning. According to this survey, the term "patois" was by far the most commonly used designation. Although the word gallo has been attested for a long time, with its first written occurrence dating to 1358, it is therefore largely a relatively recent denomination.

Gallo is also referred to as "langue gallèse" (Gallo language) or "Britto-Romance".

The term "Britto-Romance" was coined in 1978 by the linguist Alan-Joseph Raude to emphasize that Gallo is "a Romance idiom spoken by Bretons". According to him, the designation "patois" is inappropriate because it denotes "an inferior vernacular variety of a language of culture", a concept that is sociological rather than linguistic.

Another linguist, Jean-Paul Chauveau, similarly considers the term "patois" to be generic, as it can be applied to any variety of speech in France that differs from French. In this sense, it "denies any specific identity to the language to which it is applied".

The term "patois" is generally perceived as pejorative, although it may retain an affective or familiar connotation for some Gallo speakers.

Gallo should not be confused with the Gallo-Romans, nor with the term "Gallo-Romance", which refers to the Romance varieties spoken in former Roman Gaul that later gave rise to the Oïl languages, including both Gallo and French. In Breton, until around 1960, the term Gallaoued did not specifically denote the French (Fransizien), but rather local Romance-language speakers, such as inhabitants of market towns who had shifted to French.

=== Classification ===
Gallo is part of the Oïl languages, a linguistic group that occupies roughly the northern half of France. This group includes a wide range of more or less clearly defined and differentiated varieties that share a Latin origin and a Germanic influence derived from Old Frankish, the language of the Franks. Among the Oïl languages, in addition to Gallo, are Picard, Norman, French (that is, Francien as spoken in Île-de-France and the Orléanais), Poitevin, Champenois, Romance Lorrain, Berrichon, Northern Burgundian, and others.

Gallo, like the other Oïl languages, is neither Old French nor a deformation of modern French. The historical developments are largely shared, including the influence of Frankish on vocabulary and syntax, the loss of the nominative versus oblique case distinction, and the loss of pronunciation of many final letters. Gallo has evolved continuously since the medieval period, and an earlier stage referred to as "Old Gallo" can therefore be identified.

Moreover, because Old French itself was only weakly standardized, medieval writers used terms and constructions characteristic of their own regions. As a result, traces of Old Gallo can be found in medieval writings from Upper Brittany.

The Oïl languages belong to the group of Gallo-Romance languages, which also includes Franco-Provençal, spoken in particular around Savoy. The Gallo-Romance languages are themselves part of the wider group of Romance languages, which also includes, among others, Italian, Spanish, and Romanian. The Romance languages in turn belong to the larger Indo-European language family.

Breton has influenced Gallo through a limited number of lexical borrowings. However, the use of the preposition "pour" as an auxiliary verb has been identified as being of Celtic origin. The relationship between Breton and Gallo has been compared to that between the two languages of Scotland: Scots and Scottish Gaelic.

Comparison with other languages of France.
Gallo (Oïl language)	Norman (Oïl language)	Poitevin (Oïl language)	Picard (Oïl language)	Tourangeau (Oïl language)	French (Oïl language)	Occitan (Langue d'oc) written in the classical standard	Breton (Brittonic language)
Le monde vienent su la térre librs tertous e s'entrvalent en drets e dignetë. Il lou apartient d'avair de la rézon e de l'esprit e il ont de s'entrenchevi côme feraent dés freres.	Touos les houmes nâquissent libes et parêles dauns leus taête et en dreits. Il ount byin de l'obiche et de l'ingamo et deivent faire d'aveu leus prochan coume si ch'teit pour yeus.	Le munde trtouts avant naeçhu libres trtouts parélls den la dégnetai é den lés dréts. L'avant de l'aeme é de la cunsience é le devant coméyà e trtouts fratrnaument.	Tous ches ètes humains is sont nès libes et égals in dignitè et pi in droéts. Is sont dotès d'roaison et pis d'conschienche et pis is doévtte foaire ches uns invers ches eutes dins un esprit d'fratérnitè.	Tertos les houms naissont libĕrs, ansement is aont les meimĕs dreits e la meimĕ dighnitaiy. Is aont coumĕ dounaison ieun antendouerĕ e ieunĕ airzon e is deivont s'ajidair les ieuns les outĕrs coumĕ des frairĕs.	Tous les êtres humains naissent libres et égaux en dignité et en droits. Ils sont doués de raison et de conscience et doivent agir les uns envers les autres dans un esprit de fraternité.	Totes los èssers umans naisson liures e egals en dignitat e en dreches. Son dotats de rason e de consciéncia e se devon comportar los unes amb los autres dins un esperit de fraternitat.	Libr ha par an eil re ouzh ar re all eo ganet tout an dud, koulz diwar-bouez an droedoù hag an dignite. Rezon ha skiant zo dezho ha rankout a reont beviñ an eil asambles gant egile, e-ser kaout ur spered a vreudeuriezh.

== Geography ==
=== Linguistic area ===
Map of the Oïl languages according to Marie-Rose Simoni-Aurembou.

The linguistic area of Gallo is difficult to define. To the west, the linguistic boundary of Brittany is clearly identifiable, as it separates a Celtic language from a Romance variety. By contrast, the boundary between Gallo and the other Oïl languages is less clearly defined, owing to the existence of a dialect continuum. Traditionally, the Oïl-speaking area has often been divided according to the limits of historical regions. However, these boundaries do not always correspond to linguistic realities.

Some authors rely on traditional regions to define the Gallo area, while introducing qualifications. Walther von Wartburg, Hans-Erich Keller, and Robert Geuljans conventionally equate the Gallo area with the departmental boundaries of Ille-et-Vilaine and Loire-Atlantique, while adding northern Anjou. Hervé Abalain likewise restricts Gallo to Upper Brittany, but extends it to the western fringe of Mayenne and Maine-et-Loire. He further groups Gallo, Angevin, Norman, and the varieties of Mayenne and Sarthe into a single set, which he terms the western Oïl languages.

Defining the limits of Gallo is further complicated by a lack of detailed cartography for the central varieties of the Oïl domain. The speech forms of Maine, Touraine, and the Orléanais are situated between Paris and more clearly identified Oïl languages such as Gallo or Norman. These varieties tend to be marginalized and lack a strong linguistic identity. Some scholars therefore consider north-central France to constitute a central zone without clear internal boundaries. In this perspective, Marcel Cohen regarded Maine as an indeterminate area in which Gallo, Angevin, and Orléanais intermingle, and consequently declined to draw boundaries between them.

Marie-Rose Simoni-Aurembou considers Gallo to be an "Oïl variety", comparable to Norman or Poitevin, bordered to the east by a set of "Oïl variations" such as Angevin. According to her, Gallo does not extend beyond the limits of historical Brittany, except in the south, where Poitevin extends northward toward the Loire, without actually reaching it.

Finally, some authors disregard traditional boundaries altogether and rely exclusively on linguistic criteria to define the Oïl languages. Jean-Paul Chauveau, drawing in particular on lexical influences, groups Gallo, Angevin, and Mayennais into a broad area known as the "Pays d'Ouest", which he subdivides into three zones: a western zone including Côtes-d'Armor, Morbihan, and western Ille-et-Vilaine; an eastern zone comprising Sarthe, Mayenne, and eastern Ille-et-Vilaine; and a southern zone including Loire-Atlantique and Maine-et-Loire. This last zone lacks cohesion, as the area north of the Loire aligns more closely with the Mayenne group, while the area south of the river shows Poitevin influence. Chauveau does not define a clear boundary between Gallo and Poitevin, but instead identifies a threshold marked by the Loire.

The languages of Brittany and neighboring regions according to several authors:

According to Hervé Abalain.

According to Jean-Paul Chauveau.

According to Pierre Bonnaud.

According to Marie-Rose Simoni-Aurembou.

=== Boundary between Gallo and Breton ===
The modern western boundary of Gallo is clearly defined, as it bears no resemblance to Breton. The linguistic frontier between the two languages was compared to the "Great Wall of China" by the historian Pierre-Michel-François Chevalier in 1845. In 1952, Francis Gourvil traced this boundary between Plouha, on the western coast of the Bay of Saint-Brieuc, and the Pénerf River near the Rhuys Peninsula. Between these two points, he drew the line through Senven-Léhart, Quintin, Mûr-de-Bretagne, Saint-Gérand, Réguiny, and Sulniac.

The linguistic boundary has shifted over the centuries, as evidenced by toponymy. Place names beginning with Car-, Ker-, or Tre- and parish names illustrate the successive retreats of Breton from its maximum territorial extent. Breton and Gallo coexisted in central Brittany during the period of Middle Breton (1100–1650).

However, the boundary remained relatively stable during the Middle Breton period (1100–1650). Toponymy, particularly place names beginning with Ker-, indicates this boundary in the 12th century, and maps from the 17th century show essentially the same line. The earlier retreat of Breton in the Guérande Peninsula began during this period and continued until the early 20th century. In this area, Breton was not replaced by Gallo but by French, specifically a regional variety similar to that spoken in the rest of Lower Brittany until the 1980s.

=== Boundary between Gallo and neighboring Oïl languages ===
Illustration of the dialect continuum showing variations in the pronunciation of the vowel [ɛ] in the word “haie” (a, è, é, éï, etc.). White areas represent regions where the word was not recorded.

To the east, Gallo borders Norman, Mayennais, and Angevin, the latter two belonging to the same linguistic group as Gallo, and Poitevin to the south. All these varieties are part of the Oïl languages and share a common Latin origin. It is not possible to draw clear boundaries between them other than historical ones. They form a dialect continuum, meaning that they overlap and blend across several regions before encountering linguistic borders where they come into contact with entirely different languages.

The Oïl language continuum extends, for example, from the border with Breton to Belgium, where it meets Dutch and its Flemish dialects. Within this range, one moves progressively from Gallo to Mayennais, Norman, Champenois, Picard, and others. Administrative and linguistic boundaries rarely coincide.

The word for "today" provides an illustrative example of this overlap. Most Gallo speakers use the term anet, but in the easternmost part of Upper Brittany, along the borders with Mayenne and Maine-et-Loire, speakers use anui, a form also found in Mayennais, Angevin, and Norman. Conversely, a form similar to the Gallo anet is attested in Ernée in Mayenne.

Varieties located within the Oïl continuum therefore overlap, and Angevin and Gallo speakers may understand each other to some extent and use similar vocabulary. By contrast, varieties located at the extremes of the continuum are not mutually intelligible. Gallo, for example, contrasts sharply with Walloon, which is also an Oïl language but is not understood by Gallo speakers.

The varieties linguistically closest to Gallo are those of Maine, Anjou, and the southern part of Manche, located south of the Joret line and comparable to the dialects of southern Calvados and western Orne in western Normandy.

While the transition toward Mayennais, Angevin, and Norman is gradual, the transition with Poitevin to the south is more abrupt. A dense bundle of isoglosses crosses the former Marches of Brittany and Poitou, near the present-day boundary between Loire-Atlantique and Vendée, marking a zone of rapid transition from Gallo to Poitevin.

One emblematic feature of this rapid transition is the use in Poitevin of the subject personal pronouns "i" for the first person and "le" for the third person, as opposed to the Gallo system "je" and "il". This pronoun system is found south of a line placing certain communes in southern Loire-Atlantique (Legé, Corcoué-sur-Logne, Touvois) within the Poitevin domain, while some communes in northwestern Vendée (Noirmoutier-en-l'Île, Bouin, Bois-de-Céné in the Breton Marsh) align more closely with Gallo with respect to this feature.

=== Regional variations ===
Pronunciation of the pronoun “moi” (“me”) by region.

Formation of the plural of the word “chapeau” (“hat”) by region.

It is not easy to group the regional variations of Gallo into clearly defined dialects. Depending on the criteria chosen, the geographical definition of potential dialects can vary considerably. Using demonstrative pronouns as a criterion, for example, the following variations can be distinguished:

- The "Ille-et-Vilaine" form: le sien (masc.), la siene (fem.).
- The "Côtes-d'Armor" form: lu, li (masc.), lë, yelle (fem.).
- The "Morbihan" form: le ci (masc.), la celle (fem.).
- Southern Loire-Atlantique follows the Poitevin model: qho-la (masc.), qhelle-la (fem.).

From a phonological perspective, three further groups can be identified:

- The northern group (Rennes, Saint-Malo, Saint-Brieuc), characterized by the reduction of final diphthongs: ɛw in chatèo reduced to ɛ, aw in journao reduced to a, and aj in masculine words such as travail reduced to aː. This group also distinguishes between different diphthongs in the singular and plural: un chapè, dés chapiaos.
- The central group (Gallo-speaking Morbihan, Guérande, Pays de la Mée), characterized by the voicing of t to d and the replacement of o with u.
- The southern group (Pays de Retz, Vignoble nantais), closer to Poitevin, features past participles in aj instead of ə. It is also marked by the voicing of s to z, the replacement of final u with ø, voiced final consonants, and the pronunciation of the cluster lj as j (thus ljəv is pronounced jəv).

Numerous additional regional divisions can be added based on pronunciation. For example, the "ai" of mai, corresponding to French "oi" in moi, is pronounced a around Rennes, aj in Loire-Atlantique, and me or ɛ along the border with the Breton-speaking area. This distribution does not apply to all words: for instance, the ɛ area extends eastward for the "ai" in vair ("voir"), and words such as vaizin ("voisin") and baire ("boire") are generally pronounced vejzɛ̃ and bejʁ, or vajzɛ̃ and bajʁ.

The infinitive ending of verbs in -er also shows differences in pronunciation. In general, Gallo speakers pronounce this ending as ə (for example, manjer mɑ̃ʷʒə for "manger"), except around the Loire estuary and the English Channel, where -er is pronounced as in French. Around Cancale and Corcoué, the ending is pronounced aj. This distribution does not apply to past participles and common nouns ending in -é, such as mangé or blé, whose pronunciation follows other regional patterns. In some places, such as Abbaretz, the pronunciation of the past participle differs depending on whether it is used with the auxiliary yètr ("être") or avair ("avoir"). The word bllë ("blé"), for its part, can be pronounced blé, blë, byé, byë, byè, byëy, or byay depending on the region. The appearance of l in bllë is relatively recent and mainly affects the northern coast and the Rennes area. It probably entered Gallo under the influence of French, which led to increased palatalization of words.

Differences in pronunciation sometimes lead to lexical variation, as with the word ouézè (plural ouéziaos in some areas). In Gallo, it may be pronounced ouazé, ouazéo, ouézè, ouézéo, or ouéziao, except in a small area northwest of Rennes, where a g is added at the beginning: gaziao. This addition likely serves to avoid hiatus and facilitate pronunciation, and recalls the transformation of Celtic w into g in Latin-based languages (for example, waspa "waste" gave rise to French gaspiller). Finally, around Vannes, "bird" is said as pichon, a word derived from Latin pipione, equivalent to French pigeon.

== History ==
=== Celtic, Latin, and Germanic roots ===
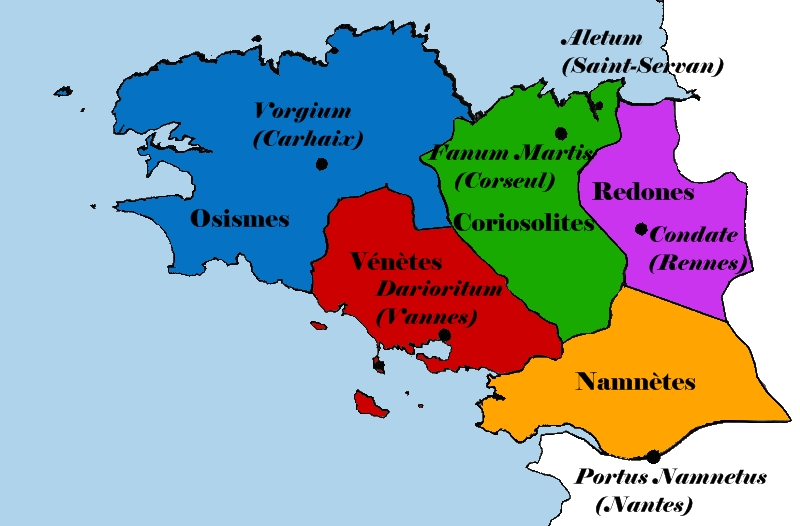
The Gaulish peoples of Armorica.

The Celts from north of the Alps and Central Europe settled in Armorica and other areas, often close to European coastlines, around the 8th century BC (archaeological remains have been found at sites such as Roquepertuse, Entremont, and Ensérune). Several peoples emerged there, including the Redones and the Namnetes. They spoke varieties of the Gaulish language and maintained significant economic ties with the British Isles. The conquest of Armorica by Julius Caesar in 56 BC led to a degree of Romanization of the population, but only the upper social strata truly adopted Latin culture. Gaulish continued to be spoken in the region until the 6th century, especially in sparsely populated rural areas. Thus, when the Britto-Romans, arriving from Great Britain, settled in western Armorica, they encountered a population that had retained certain aspects of Gaulish culture, although it was Christian and composed of Roman citizens. The integration of the Bretons therefore proceeded relatively smoothly. The first small Breton kingdoms, such as Cornouaille and Domnonée, emerged in the 5th century.

In contrast to the rural areas of western Armorica, the cities of Nantes and Rennes were genuine Roman cultural centers. Following the barbarian invasions of the 5th and 6th centuries, these two cities, as well as the regions east of the Vilaine River, came under Frankish domination. Franks also settled within the Celtic domain, where pockets of Gallo-Roman population already existed, for example around Vannes and Saint-Brieuc. Settlement in Armorica during the Merovingian period was therefore diverse, combining Bretons from Great Britain assimilated with Gaulish tribes, Latinized urban populations, and Germanic groups.

The boundary between the Breton kingdoms and the Frankish kingdom was unstable and difficult to define, particularly because wars between Franks and Bretons were frequent between the 6th and 9th centuries. Before the 10th century, Breton was spoken by at least part of the population as far east as Pornic and Roz-sur-Couesnon. Beyond this lay the Breton March, a Romance-speaking frontier zone established by the Frankish kings, which later shifted eastward to include the Avranchin and the Cotentin following the Treaty of Compiègne.

Nevertheless, according to most toponymists, Brittonic place names do not extend east of the Couesnon River. This casts doubt on the idea that Breton was ever widely spoken east of this river during the 9th or 10th century.

=== Emergence of Gallo ===
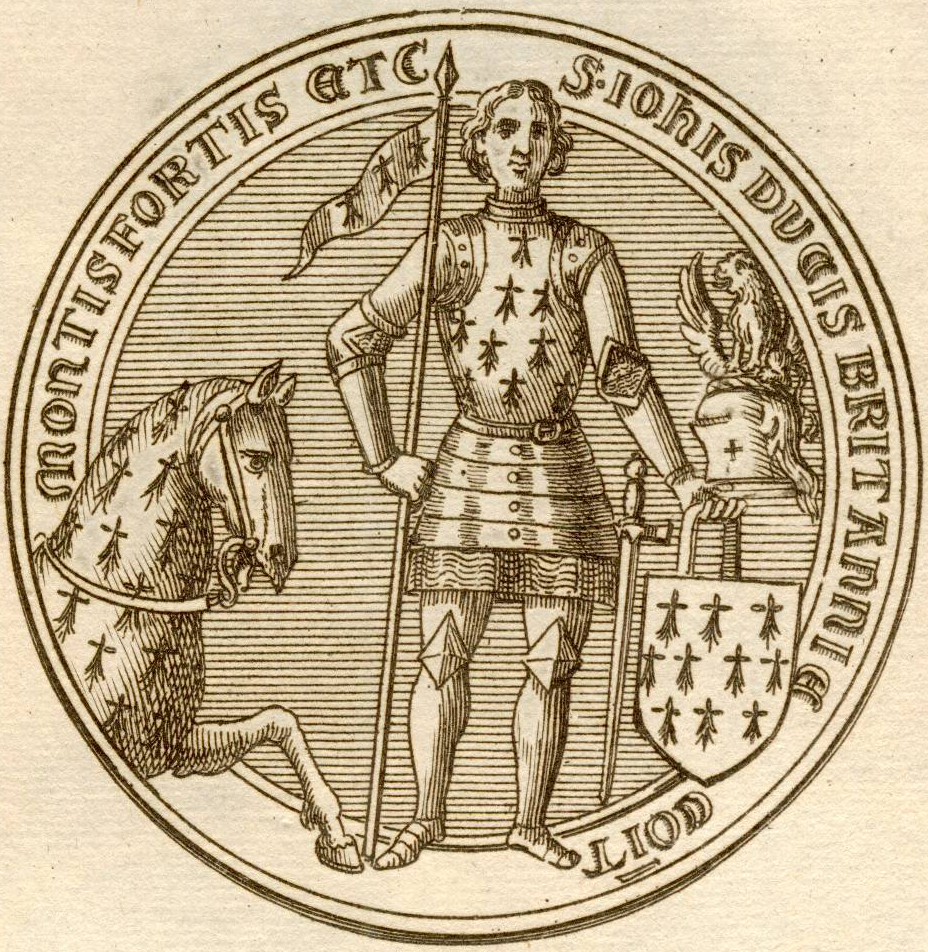
John IV, Duke of Brittany, whose administration mentions the term "gallo" for the first time.

The Latinized population of Upper Brittany spoke the Vulgar Latin of Gaul, a language influenced by Gaulish, particularly in vocabulary and pronunciation. The palatalization of [k] to [ʃ], for example from cantare to chanter, and the spirantization of [b] to [v], as in faba becoming fève, probably date from this period. Latin grammatical declensions and the neuter gender began to disappear as early as the Gallo-Roman period, while articles started to be used.

The Franks introduced a new language, Old Frankish, but they did not impose it on the Gallo-Romans, and Latin continued to be used until the early 9th century. For roughly three hundred years, northern France thus experienced a period of Latin/Frankish bilingualism. During this time, the Franks gradually adopted Latin as the written and religious language. Like the Gauls before them, they influenced the language's evolution by contributing Germanic vocabulary and modifying pronunciation.

The Vikings who invaded Brittany in the 10th century also introduced some Old Norse vocabulary, which can still be found in contemporary Gallo. In fact, all of these Old Norse-derived words are also found in Norman, an Oïl language that contains even more of them. As with Standard French, these terms are more likely borrowings from Norman, since they are all shared with that language, whereas the reverse is not true. Examples include bouette or boite "fishing bait" (from Old Norse beita), biter or abiter "to touch" (Old Norse bíta "to bite"), bruman "newlywed, son-in-law" (Old Norse bruðmaðr), falle "bird's crop" (Old Norse falr), jenotte "earthnut" (Old Norse *jarðhnot), ha "dogfish" (Old Norse há), mielle "sandy ground, dune" (Old Norse melr), and mucre "damp, moldy" (Old Norse mykr). Exceptions include a few terms used for navigation and early maritime techniques in the Loire estuary and valley, which are direct borrowings from Old Norse, such as gueurde "rope used to hoist part of a sail" and guiroie, which later became French girouette ("weather vane").

The Oïl languages appeared in a more or less stabilized written form around the 11th century. At that time, differences between regional varieties were probably less pronounced than today. Lexical borrowing between dialects was frequent, and there are few written records of regional varieties, since scribes used a kind of common interdialectal literary language throughout northern France. The language of the court and of literature began to diverge sharply from regional speech from the 13th century onward, while these varieties also underwent independent phonetic changes and increasingly diverged from one another.

The earliest written traces of Gallo date from the 12th century. The Aiquin, the only Breton chanson de geste, contains several terms specific to contemporary Gallo, such as s'aroter "to set off" and lours "their". The Livre des Manières by Stephen de Fougères also contains many features characteristic of Gallo, including terms such as enveier ("to send"), il deit ("he must"), and chasteaus ("castles"; in modern Gallo: chatiaos).

A text from the Chronicles of Saint-Denis written in the 13th century mentions "Bretons who speak Breton", implying for the first time the existence of Bretons who did not speak the Breton language. The term "gallo" itself was first used in 1358, in a document issued by Duke John IV to his treasurer Georges Gicquel: "nostre general recepveur en Bretaigne gallou, salut."

The designation "Gallo Brittany" or its synonym Upper Brittany subsequently appears regularly in medieval texts.

=== Retreat of Breton ===
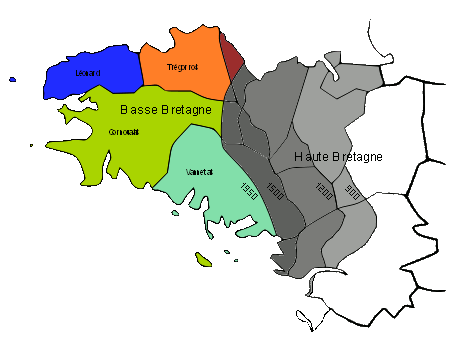
Map illustrating contemporary Breton-speaking Brittany and its dialects in color. The retreat of Breton is symbolized by the gray gradient.

When Insular Bretons settled in western Armorica, urban centers as well as the countryside east of a Trieux–Laïta line remained strongly Romanized. While Breton quickly became dominant west of this line, the linguistic reality in the eastern part was different and should rather be understood as a zone where bilingualism was the norm, with the majority of the rural population consisting of Romance-language speakers. In the 9th century, with the expansion of Breton territory into the formerly Frankish dioceses of Nantes and Rennes under the reign of Nominoe, the Breton language reached its greatest geographical extent. In the following century, however, Breton already began to retreat within the bilingual zone. This retreat was slow, and Breton-speaking enclaves persisted in eastern Brittany, first along the north coast as far as Dinan in the 12th century, then as far as Saint-Brieuc in the 16th century. In the south, east of Guérande, the retreat of Breton was not clearly marked before the 19th century.

In mixed areas, borrowings from Breton into Gallo were more numerous than elsewhere.

=== Decline of Gallo ===
Standard French, which developed during the Renaissance, initially functioned as a sociolect, meaning that it was used only by certain social classes. The Ordinance of Villers-Cotterêts, promulgated in 1539, made the use of French compulsory in official documents. Education then became the main vector for spreading the language, from the 17th century onward, when the use of Latin declined at universities. In 1793, during the French Revolution, French became the sole language of public instruction. From the reign of Louis Philippe I, education became more accessible, and Jules Ferry made schooling free, secular, and compulsory in 1882. From that point on, all French citizens attended school and therefore learned French.

The 19th century was also marked by profound social changes that favored the disappearance of regional languages. Conscription, introduced during the Revolution, brought together men from different regions who had to use French to communicate. The construction of roads and railways increased mobility, while rural exodus and urban industrialization led to population mixing. Industrial growth also gave rise to a new bourgeoisie that disparaged regional speech, and the expansion of the press helped disseminate the French language. This process, initiated by newspapers, was continued in the 20th century by radio and then television. In Upper Brittany, as in the rest of France, bilingualism became widespread before being followed by frequent abandonment of the regional language.

The use of Gallo became confined to informal situations in rural settings. While agriculture remained dominant in Upper Brittany until the 1950s, it declined sharply thereafter, reducing opportunities to speak Gallo. The decrease in the number of speakers was further intensified by the lack of intergenerational transmission, as parents no longer wished to teach their children a language associated with a declining social milieu and perceived as an obstacle to social and economic advancement. The negative image that the state had associated with Gallo and other regional languages was thus relayed by the speakers themselves.

In response to the decline of Gallo, protective movements emerged at the end of the 19th century and gained momentum in the 1970s. Today, the entire French population speaks French, and regional languages, once on the verge of extinction, are no longer repressed as they were under the French Third Republic. The Breton Cultural Charter, signed in 1977 by the state and Breton local authorities, marked a significant shift in the perception of the languages of Brittany. The charter states, for example, that it is necessary to "ensure that the Breton language and the Gallo speech, and their specific cultures, are provided with the means necessary for their development, including in education and on radio and television."

Since the early 1980s, Gallo has therefore been taught in a small number of educational settings. Nevertheless, it is classified as a seriously endangered language by UNESCO.

== Sociolinguistics ==
=== Language or dialect ===
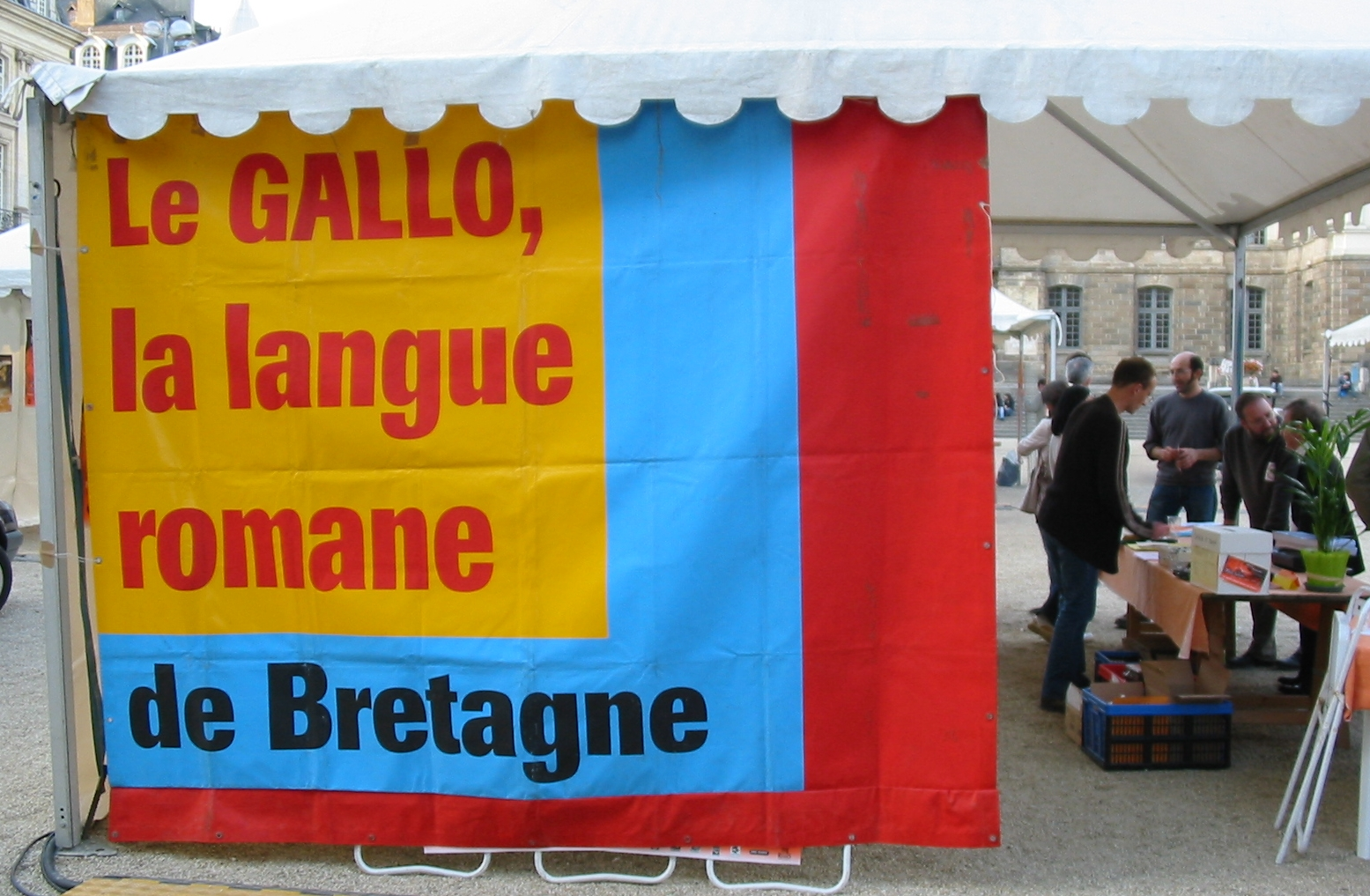
Promotion of Gallo at the Mill Góll festival in Rennes in 2007.

In 1878, Paul Sébillot wrote: "The speech spoken in the Gallo or French-speaking country is a dialect of French, which has affinities with the dialects of neighboring regions, especially Angevin, Tourangeau, and Lower Norman: it contains a large number of old words, a very small number of words borrowed from Breton, and is, apart from fairly numerous local expressions but with very French turns of phrase, very easy to understand."

Gallo is not necessarily intelligible to a French speaker, notably because of its distinctive phonology and vocabulary. Mutual intelligibility between speakers of different languages is, moreover, strongly conditioned by their willingness to understand and their individual background, such as knowledge of linguistics or general culture. Contemporary linguist Bernard Cerquiglini holds a view opposed to that of Paul Sébillot. According to him, Gallo, like the other Oïl languages, cannot be considered a dialect of French because the differences between the two are too great. According to Cerquiglini, the fact that Gallo derives directly from Vulgar Latin, and not from a regional deformation of French, also prevents it from being classified as a dialect. He thus emphasizes the highly artificial nature of standard French, even in relation to its Francien origins. The study of languages and dialects has evolved considerably since the 19th century, and there is no longer any universally accepted criterion for distinguishing a dialect from a language.

According to contemporary theories, Gallo cannot be considered a language if one assumes that it lacks high cultural prestige or the status of an official language. Nor is it a major factor of cohesion and identity, unlike Breton or Basque. On the other hand, Gallo can be regarded as a language because it possesses a degree of standardization, writing systems, and a body of literature, even if these remain at a developmental stage. Finally, the status of language or dialect attributed to a speech variety often depends more on political factors than on strictly linguistic ones.

=== Status and recognition ===
At the international level, Gallo does not have an ISO 639 language code. It has no official status at the national level, as France recognizes only one official language, French. While regional languages were initially regarded as incompatible with the ideal of a single and indivisible republic, the French state has gradually begun to take them into account. However, it has not adopted a proactive language policy aimed at encouraging formal recognition of regional languages, instead favoring limited and accommodating measures.

Since the amendment of the French Constitution in 2008, Gallo has been recognized as part of the national heritage of France. Article 75-1 of the Constitution of France states that "regional languages belong to the heritage of France." In addition, Gallo is the only Oïl language officially recognized as a "regional language" by the French Ministry of National Education, as it is the only one taught within the school system.

Public recognition of Gallo within Brittany is relatively recent. On 17 December 2004, the Regional Council of Brittany unanimously recognized Breton and Gallo as "the languages of Brittany, alongside the French language." The Departmental Council of Ille-et-Vilaine has also publicly expressed support for Gallo. By contrast, in Loire-Atlantique and the wider Pays de la Loire region, no official position regarding Gallo has been adopted.

=== Standardisation ===
The recognition of Gallo by local authorities, as well as its introduction into the school system, has raised the issue of standardisation. This issue has generated significant ideological debate, without leading to a consensual solution, as is often the case for languages that are not regulated by a state authority. Other languages of France, such as Occitan, face similar debates.

Supporters of standardisation view it as a way to confer prestige on Gallo and to facilitate both its teaching and mutual intelligibility among speakers. Opponents argue that the creation of a norm would impoverish the language and that selecting one variety over others would be arbitrary. Moreover, standardisation is not necessarily a required stage in the development of minority languages. Corsican, for example, which is offered in the CAPES teaching examination and other university qualifications, is a polynomic language without a universal standard, comprising many dialects united by a strong shared identity. In the case of Corsican, the absence of a standard has not hindered either its teaching or the development of writing systems.

A possible standardisation is also not necessarily required for a language with limited media visibility and whose use by administrative or governmental bodies is not envisaged. The issue could nevertheless become more significant if Gallo were to gain greater media exposure in the future.

The question of Gallo standardisation has largely been sidestepped by teachers. They generally transmit the variety they themselves learned, and most do not wish to see the creation of a norm that would override regional variation. However, Gallo teaching programmes at secondary and higher education levels include a dialectological approach, providing learners with an overall view of the language and facilitating comprehension of varieties they have not personally learned. The development of writing systems is sometimes perceived as a form of standardisation, but this concerns only orthography, not grammar, pronunciation, or vocabulary. These systems tend instead to reinforce regional varieties, either by proposing flexible spellings that respect variation or by establishing fixed orthographies that still allow for differences in pronunciation when read aloud.

=== Relations with Breton and French ===
According to its designer, the five black stripes of the Breton flag represent the five traditional regions of Upper Brittany where Gallo is spoken. The four regions of Lower Brittany, where Breton is spoken, are represented by the white stripes.

Breton, like Gallo, is in decline. Nevertheless, it has an undisputed status as a language and plays a strong role in identity formation. It benefits from a long tradition of activism and is no longer subject to strong negative perceptions. On the contrary, it affirms the distinctiveness of Breton culture, whereas Gallo is associated with French and thus perceived as external. As a non-Celtic element and a language without prestige, Gallo may be viewed as inferior to Breton.

In Loire-Atlantique, movements defending the Breton identity of the department rely far more on the Breton language, traditionally spoken in a small area around Guérande, than on Gallo, despite the latter having a much wider geographical distribution and also serving as a link between the departments of historic Brittany.

At the institutional level, the persistent difference in treatment between the two languages further marginalises Gallo, as Breton consistently benefits from greater resources for teaching and promotion. According to the theory of "one people, one language", Breton would be the national language of Brittany, leaving no place for Gallo. Granting Gallo equal status with Breton within Breton culture would also highlight the Romance character of that culture and render it bipolar, or even tripolar if French is also considered a language of Brittany.

While the promotion of Breton tends to overshadow Gallo, French contributes more directly to its marginalisation. French has been firmly established in Upper Brittany since the 1960s, and Gallo is disappearing mainly because it has become increasingly difficult to practise. It is no longer essential to everyday life and, for many speakers, has become merely a local speech variety used only in certain contexts. Gallo also remains associated with a pejorative image and is often perceived as coarse or backward, whereas French carries more prestigious connotations. Writing also constitutes a weakness of Gallo in comparison with French. Although writing systems exist, they are little known among speakers, and Gallo remains largely perceived as an oral language. Moreover, speakers are not always able to read or write Gallo without prior instruction.

Due to long-standing and close contact, Gallo has also been profoundly influenced by French. Many speakers alternate between Gallo and French words or sentences within the same discourse without being aware of switching languages. Conversely, non-Gallo speakers in Upper Brittany may use Gallo terms unknowingly. This "creolisation" of Gallo has increased its proximity to French and weakened its linguistic autonomy, while also contributing to a decline in speakers' linguistic awareness. The simplification of Gallo may at times be deliberate, particularly among storytellers, in order to reach a broader audience that includes non-speakers.

=== Number of speakers ===
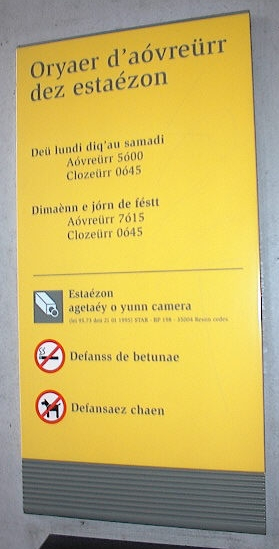
Gallo signage on Line A of the Rennes Metro, using the ELG writing system.

Determining the number of Gallo speakers is difficult, as respondents in surveys may misjudge their own language proficiency. In addition, the social stigma affecting Gallo likely leads to false or underestimated declarations, particularly among younger people. Finally, many individuals speak Gallo while using a large number of French words and syntactic structures, and therefore cannot always be counted as speakers in a strict sense.

In the 1999 census, 49,626 residents of historic Brittany responded to the survey entitled Étude de l'histoire familiale, which included a question on languages used with relatives. It reported 29,060 people using Gallo, including 28,300 in the Brittany region (1.3% of the population, while Breton speakers represented 12%). After extrapolation to the total population, the number of Gallo speakers was ultimately estimated at 40,710 in historic Brittany, or about 1% of its population. Gallo thus ranked fourth, behind French, Breton (11.3%), and English (4.3%).

Gallo was most widespread in Ille-et-Vilaine, where 2.5% of the population reported using it according to the 1999 census, followed by the Côtes-d'Armor (1.8%), Morbihan (1.6%), and Loire-Atlantique (1.5%). According to the same census, Ille-et-Vilaine was the only department where Gallo speakers outnumbered Breton speakers. A survey conducted for the Credilif laboratory at University of Rennes 2 in 2008 reported around 200,000 speakers; this figure was said to double when including those able to understand Gallo.

A survey carried out in 2004 and 2005 across all departments of Upper Brittany showed that only 5% of Gallo-speaking parents had passed the language on to their children. Transmission appeared instead to occur more often from grandparents to grandchildren. The 2004–2005 survey also showed that the vast majority of Gallo speakers were or had been farmers, and that only 23% of respondents declared being able to write in Gallo.

In 2013, the association Bretagne Culture Diversité decided to create a barometer of Breton public opinion by conducting regular surveys based on the same questions. The first was entrusted to the TMO Régions institute, which conducted telephone interviews with 1,003 people aged 18 and over between 9 and 17 December 2013 in the five departments of historic Brittany. This survey showed a significant difference compared with the 1999 INSEE survey. According to the results, 5% of residents of historic Brittany declared that they spoke Gallo very well or fairly well, whereas in 1999 INSEE had estimated the proportion of Gallo speakers at 1.3% of the population of the four-department Brittany region.

In addition, 8% of residents of historic Brittany said they understood Gallo very well or fairly well, 8.9% said they spoke or understood a few words, and 83% did not use it at all. The survey also included a new question on the future of the language: 42% of residents of Brittany said they were worried about the future of Gallo, 18% were confident, and 28% were indifferent. These figures brought the two languages of Brittany closer together, with Breton spoken by 6% of residents of Brittany and Gallo by 5%, while 9% of residents understood Breton and 8% understood Gallo. Opinions differed more sharply regarding the future of the two languages: 40% of Bretons were confident about the future of Breton, compared with only 19% who were indifferent. Likewise, the proportion of respondents who did not express an opinion was lower for Breton (4%) than for Gallo (12%).

A new survey commissioned by the Brittany region in 2024 and conducted by the TMO institute revealed a sharp decline in the number of speakers, now estimated at 132,000 people, compared with 191,000 in the 2018 survey. According to this survey, Gallo now has more speakers than Breton.

=== Education ===
The teaching of Gallo in schools was first proposed shortly before the Second World War by the Compagnons de Merlin, the Gallo-speaking branch of the Breton Regionalist Federation (FRB). Beyond being a cultural demand, the introduction of Gallo in schools was seen as a way to improve pupils' academic performance, notably by valuing their linguistic skills. These demands raised, for the first time, the issue of possible standardisation of Gallo and the creation of a writing system. The ideas were not taken up again until the 1970s. In 1977, the signing of the Breton Cultural Charter by the French state allowed for an initial form of recognition of the language.

During the 1981–1982 school year, the Rector of the Academy of Rennes, Paul Rollin, created a post of Chargé de mission pour la langue et la culture gallèse in secondary education, entrusted to the certified history teacher Gilles Morin. At the same time, in cooperation with the departmental education authority of Ille-et-Vilaine, a post of pedagogical adviser for Gallo was created at the École normale supérieure de Rennes. Christian Leray, a teacher holding a CAEI qualification, was appointed assistant pedagogical adviser at the teacher training college (CPAEN) in September 1982, where he organised a Gallo training unit for future primary school teachers. His responsibilities included organising in-service teacher training and coordinating Gallo teaching in two rural priority education zones (ZEPs of Retiers and Tremblay–Antrain).

Gallo was offered as an optional subject in the general and technological baccalauréat examinations from 1984 onward. Optional courses and academic research on Gallo have been offered at University of Rennes 2 since 1981. Since 2008, the university has offered a Gallo option consisting of three hours per week over the three years of the undergraduate degree.

Teaching of Gallo language and culture is offered in primary schools in the Maure-de-Bretagne area of Ille-et-Vilaine, involving approximately 1,300 pupils. The association Dihun has also implemented a similar system in Catholic primary schools in eastern Morbihan. In secondary education, Gallo is offered as an optional subject. It is taught by certified teachers in seven middle schools and seven public high schools within the Academy of Rennes. It is also, within the same academy, an optional language subject in the baccalauréat examinations.

At the start of the 2009 school year, 1,400 primary school pupils, 226 middle school pupils, and 233 high school pupils were enrolled in Gallo courses. In 2011, excluding primary school pupils, there were 574 learners, representing an improvement compared with 2009. Gallo nevertheless remains one of the least taught regional languages in France. In the same year, Breton was studied by 7,324 middle and high school pupils, and Alsatian by 35,855 pupils. Only Mosellan (Lorraine Franconian) was less widely taught, with just 187 pupils.

In Loire-Atlantique, a department that is nevertheless a signatory to the Breton Cultural Charter, Gallo is taught in only one educational institution (Sion-les-Mines). This situation is mainly due to the department lying outside the Academy of Rennes and to the much weaker Gallo promotion movement there compared with the Brittany region. The geographical distribution of activism in favour of Gallo often explains the presence or absence of the language in educational institutions within a given region.

== Cultural life ==
=== Literature ===
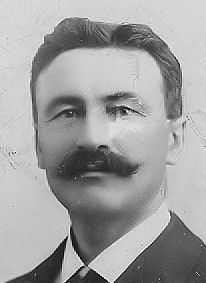
Amand Dagnet wrote the first theatrical play in Gallo in 1901.

The earliest written traces of Gallo date back to the 12th century. Le livre des Manières by Stephen de Fougères is the oldest publication in a Romance language from Brittany. The dialectal forms found in the Roman d'Aquin (or La Conqueste de la Bretaigne par le roy Charlemaigne), a chanson de geste from the 12th century, illustrate the development of the langue d'oïl in Upper Brittany.

Gallo is primarily a language of oral tradition, with a substantial body of folktales, fables, and legends. This oral tradition also includes riddles (devinaîlles), proverbs, songs, and stories that address or challenge religious beliefs. Gallo legends often revolve around recurring figures such as Gargantua, Morgan le Fay, and Birou, or attempt to explain the formation of landscapes.

Oral Gallo legends were collected from the late 19th century onward by folklorists and ethnologists such as Paul Sébillot, a native of Matignon, Adolphe Orain from Bain-de-Bretagne, François Duine from the Dolois area, and Amand Dagnet from the Coglais, who also worked in Mayenne. These authors, however, most often transcribed the tales in French. In addition, Paul Féval wrote several dialogues in Gallo in his novel Châteaupauvre, published in 1876. Amand Dagnet also produced a theatrical work in Gallo, La Fille de la Brunelas, in 1901.

In the 1920s, Jeanne Malivel of Loudéac versified a Gallo tale told by her grandmother, Les Sept Frères. This work inspired the creation of the artistic renewal movement Seiz Breur. During the 1930s and under the Occupation, Henri Calindre of Ploërmel published humorous monologues and plays in Gallo under the pseudonym Mystringue.

After the Second World War, a second wave of collection was led by Simone Morand and Albert Poulain. They were actively involved in preserving and promoting Gallo culture through publications and by founding associations such as the Groupement culturel breton des pays de Vilaine. In the 1970s, Brittany experienced a strong cultural revival, and events centered on Gallo storytelling and song emerged.

The association Les Amis du Parler Gallo was founded in 1976 and began publishing works by contemporary Gallo authors. L'Anthologie de littérature gallèse contemporaine was published in 1982 and brought together texts by around thirty authors, including Jean-Yves Bauge, Pierre Corbel, Ernestine Lorand, Gilles Morin, and Laurent Motrot. Albert Meslay published La Cosmochérette, a humorous science fiction novel, in 1983. Gallo poetry also developed, with authors such as Jacqueline Rebours, known for her politically engaged poetry, Christian Leray, and Laurent Motrot, who published poems in the journal Aneit. Bèrtran Ôbrée, singer of the band Ôbrée Alie, whose songs are mostly in Gallo, also writes poetry. The poetry collection « Poéteriy » – Poésie gallaise contemporaine was published in 1990 by Les Amis du Parler Gallo, by then renamed Bertègn Galèzz.

Although authors continued to publish in journals and newspapers, Gallo-language publishing declined during the 1990s, before growing significantly from the early 2000s onward, with many works opting for bilingual editions in Gallo and French. The emblematic work that helped revive Gallo-language publishing was written by Adèle Denys: her Mémoires d'une centenaire « aout'fas en Pays Gallo », published in 1999. New authors emerged, such as Fabien Lécuyer, whose detective novel Meliy (published in 2004) was adapted for the theatre by the Tradior company, and whose historical novel Ene oraïje naïr was also the first e-book published in Gallo. In 2007, André Bienvenu published his childhood memoirs in three volumes, Les Braises de la vie.

Despite this vitality, resistance to publishing books in Gallo remains. For example, Serge Richard's novel Ken Tost d'an Tenzor was translated into Gallo (Le Naez sus le tenzor) but did not find a publisher, as was also the case for translations of Animal Farm by George Orwell and La Guerre des boutons by Louis Pergaud.

Comics in Gallo have also developed since the 1980s. The magazine Le Lian, published by Bertègn Galèzz, featured the first Gallo-language comics, including Les Tois Frëres by Didier Auffray and La Tourneye du René, a one-panel gag series illustrated by Hubert Goger with text by Mimi Buet, from 1984 onward. Since 2011, Louis-France Baslé has published the comic strip Piyou le cania cancalais in Le Plat Gousset, a local bulletin of the town of Cancale. Albums of Tintin, Asterix, and Jack Palmer have also been translated into Gallo.

The first Gallo texts intended for children appeared in Le Lian in 1985. Children's publishing has expanded since the 2000s, notably through the associative publishing house Les Emouleriy au Sourgarre, with albums such as Miston, le ptit chutiaù by Michael Genevée and Romain Ricaud. The first Imagier en gallo by Anne-Marie Pelhate was published in 2014 and includes over six hundred illustrated Gallo words. Similarly, the Fables of La Fontaine have been translated into Gallo.

=== Music ===
Gallo music is less well known than Celtic music sung in Breton or French, but it is nonetheless a full component of Breton culture. A new generation of artists has brought the language back to the forefront of the Breton music scene in a more modern way, including Bèrtran Ôbrée, Les Vilaïnes Bétes, and IMG, as well as in a more traditional style with groups such as Les Mangeouses d'Oreilles and Girault & Guillard.

There are also artists who usually sing in French or Breton but have produced works in Gallo. These include Trouz an Noz, Tri Yann, and Cabestan.

=== Cinema ===
The studio Dizale of Quimper has dubbed two feature-length animated films (The Gruffalo and The Gruffalo's Child by Max Lang and Jakob Schuh) into Gallo, in partnership with the Institut de la langue gallèse, released in 2019.

=== Associations and cultural events ===
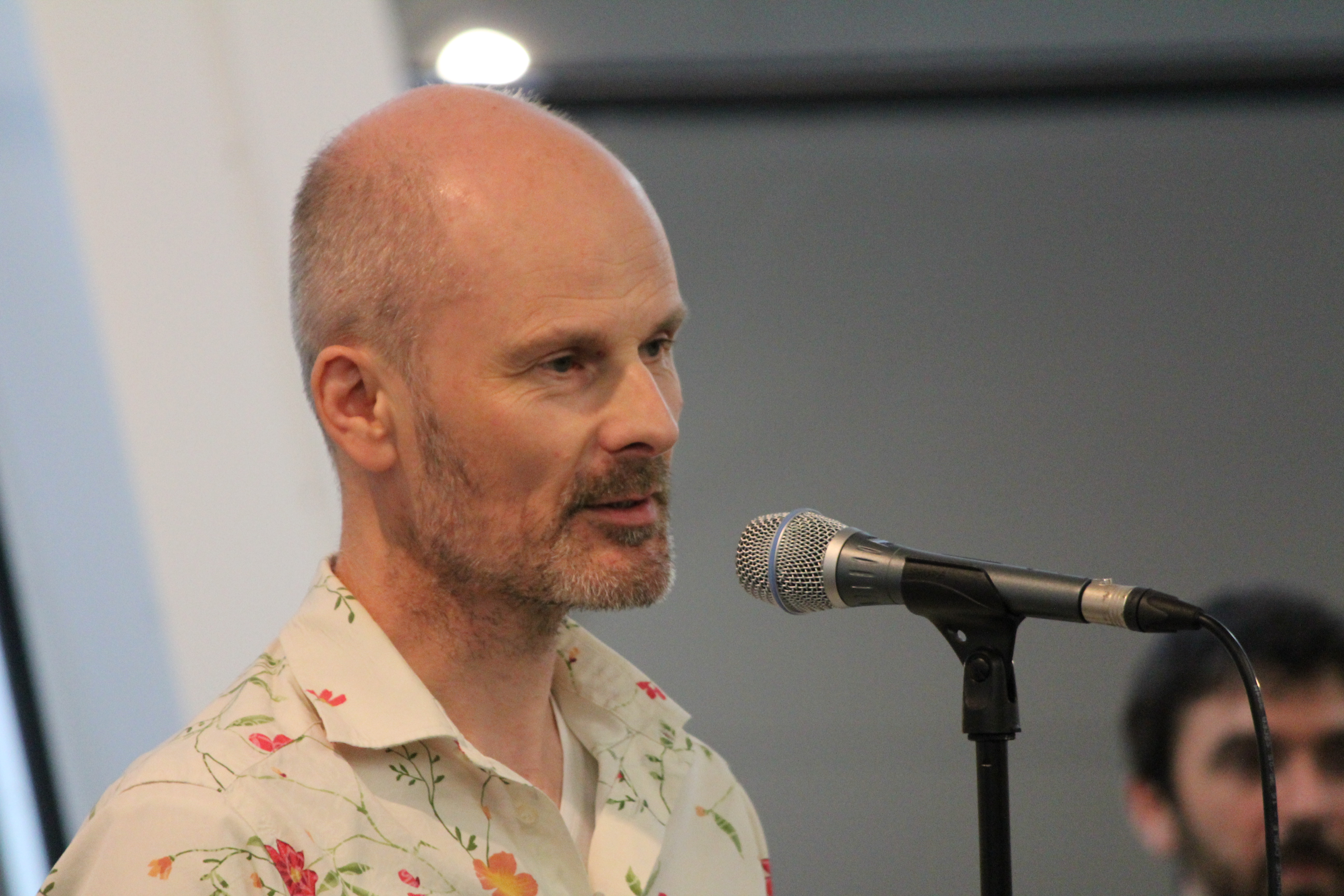
Bèrtran Ôbrée at Les Champs Libres in Rennes during the Festival of Brittany in 2012.

Simone Morand played a major role in promoting Gallo culture, even before the Second World War. The first association dedicated to the promotion of Gallo existed between 1939 and 1944: the Compagnons de Merlin, affiliated with the Fédération régionaliste de Bretagne, which published the journal Galerne. After that, associative activity was virtually nonexistent until 1976, with the founding of Les Amis du Parler Gallo, later renamed Bertègn Galèzz. An internal split among members led to the creation of the association Aneit in 1984.

Other associations were founded thereafter, including La Bouèze, the Université du temps libre of Dinan, Maézoe, Vantyé, L'Epille, La Soett, La Granjagoul, and Chubri.

These associations mainly focus on collecting and documenting the language, either across the entire Gallo-speaking area or at a local level. Some have developed databases, such as Bertègn Galèzz, while others have specialized fields of expertise, such as Maézoe in toponymy and L'Epille in traditional song. La Granjagoul, based in Parcé, is an association dedicated to safeguarding intangible cultural heritage. It carries out oral heritage collection activities in the Fougères area and supports and organizes the promotion of this heritage. It also offers activities in Gallo for children in partnership with the parents' association Dihun Breizh, which aims to promote Gallo and Breton within the education system.

Several cultural events linked to Gallo take place every year in Upper Brittany, including the Mill Góll festival in Rennes, held since 2003, La Gallésie en fête in Monterfil, the Estourniales in Liffré, Bogue d'or, a storytelling and singing competition in Redon, the Assembiés gallèses in La Chèze, and the Gallèseries of Saint-Malo.

The Breton and Gallo Language Week is held every year in March or April at the initiative of the Regional Council of Brittany. Activities are organized locally by intermunicipal groupings (pays) and aim to promote these languages. The Breton and Gallo Language Week also takes place in Loire-Atlantique, but there the activities are organized by associations rather than by official institutions.

=== Media ===
Several associations publish or have published journals written partly or entirely in Gallo. These include Pihern, an annual journal published by Vantyé in Guémené-Penfao, and Druj, a journal of L'Andon dou Galo in Trémorel, which had two issues in the 2000s. Bertègn Galèzz publishes Le Liaun, a journal with irregular periodicity published since 1978, containing many articles in Gallo. The journal Nostre lenghe aneit was also published annually in Gallo by the association Aneit in Saint-Nazaire from 1984 to 1988. In December 2014, the weekly online publication Runje, written entirely in Gallo, was launched by Fabien Lécuyer.

Nevertheless, Gallo remains largely absent from mainstream regional media. Its visibility is limited to a small number of articles and regular columns. André Le Coq has published Les Caoseries a Matao, current-affairs columns, in L'Hebdomadaire d'Armor, published in Merdrignac, since the 1990s. A weekly Gallo column titled Assis-té, mets du suc !, written by multiple authors, also appears in Le Courrier Indépendant of Loudéac. Since 2006, Hervé Drouard has written a Gallo-language current-affairs column titled Au cul d'la tonne in the weekly newspaper La Mée, based in Châteaubriant.

In 2013, Daniel Giraudon wrote a column in the Sunday edition of Ouest-France. His initial column, Le Gallo souffle sur les Breizh, compared Gallo and Breton. His later column, Le Galo come on l'caoze, focused exclusively on Gallo and was also broadcast on the radio station Plum'FM. Bèrtran Ôbrée writes the column En gallo dans le texte, illustrated by Vincent Chassé, in the quarterly magazine NousVousIlle, published by the Ille-et-Vilaine Department since the early 2010s.

The literary journal Hopala! claims to publish works in the three languages of Brittany and published poems in Gallo in 2001 and 2003. Similarly, Alain Kervern organized four trilingual haiku competitions between 2001 and 2005 in Hopala!, and later in the journal Le Peuple breton in 2011 and 2013. Articles written in Gallo by Régis Auffray, Fabien Lécuyer, and Patrick Deriano have appeared since 2005 in the Breton-language journal Ya!, published by the association Keit vimp Bev in Laz.

Online, the site Agence Bretagne Presse publishes news items and articles in Gallo. The news website 7seizh.info regularly publishes Gallo-language articles by Fabien Lécuyer on current affairs, including international news and sports.

Since 1996, Gallo has been broadcast on France Bleu Armorique through columns by Fred le Disou and Roger le Contou. Despite an announced cancellation in 2013, they have remained on air, later joined by new contributors, including a woman, in the late 2010s. Plum'FM is a community radio station created in the early 2000s in Plumelec and based in Sérent since 2009. In 2014, the station broadcast eleven and a half hours of Gallo-language programming per week, with several shows hosted by Matao Rollo and Anne-Marie Pelhate. Plum'FM also partners with Radio Bro Gwened, based in Pontivy, exchanging Gallo-language programming. Since September 2013, the Radio chrétienne francophone station in the Côtes-d'Armor has broadcast a Gallo-language radio adaptation of the novel Châteaupauvre by Paul Féval. Occasional Gallo-language programs are also broadcast by other radio stations, such as Radio Rennes, including its show Chemins de Terre, hosted by Loïc Turmel.

The presence of Gallo on television remains very limited. The first Gallo-language television program was broadcast on November 24, 2007, on the local Côtes-d'Armor channel Armor TV, presented by Matao Rollo. Fred le Disou and Roger le Contou have also appeared on the local channel TV Rennes since September 2008, where they present an unconventional weather segment.

In May 2022, the media platform Galoweb was launched. It is an online platform for the creation and distribution of audiovisual content in Gallo, modeled on the Breton-language web television channel Brezhoweb. During its first year, Galoweb offered Gallo-language programs for all ages, including nursery rhymes, a current-affairs magazine, and animated series.

== Phonology ==
=== Consonants ===
The consonants of Gallo are broadly similar to those of French. Local variants nevertheless exist, such as the voicing of s to z in the Pays de Retz, and that of t to d in the Pays de la Mée. Certain consonant clusters are also characteristic of specific regions, such as the plosives c and ɟ, that is, a k and a g accompanied by a slight j, and the affricates dʒ and tʃ in the western part of Upper Brittany. In that area, the word curë kyʁe is thus pronounced tʃyʁə, and ghepe dʒep. Elsewhere, one may hear cyʁə and ɟəp. The word Qhi can be pronounced ki, tʃi, or ci. These variations result from a fronting of the place of articulation of palatal consonants.

The semivowel j is widely used to palatalize other consonants, notably fj, tj, sj, and pj. Such palatalization is not found in all regions, however, and j is then often replaced by l. The word pllée, for example, may be realized as pje or ple.

The h, of Germanic origin, ceased to be pronounced from the 13th century. It nevertheless remains in use in the Mené, a small area around Merdrignac and Plémet.

		Labial	Dental/ Alveolar	Palatal (-alveolar)	Dorsal/ Glottal
Nasal		m	n	ɲ	
Plosive	voiceless	p	t	c	k
Plosive	voiced	b	d	(ɟ) (Note: Only used by some speakers)	ɡ
Fricative	voiceless	f	s	ʃ	(h)
Fricative	voiced	v	z	ʒ	(ʁ) (Note: Sometimes pronounced as an alveolar trill [r])
Approximant			l	j, ɥ	w
Tap/flap			ɾ		
Trill			r		

=== Vowels ===
The vowel system of Gallo is close to that of French but has undergone divergent developments. Gallo therefore displays several features that are absent from French, such as extensive use of the schwa and of diphthongs.

In Gallo as in French, stressed Latin a evolved into e or eː. Thus, adsátis gave assé ase. However, whereas French merged e and eː into a single e, Gallo preserved a distinction between the two. The eː, corresponding for example to a stressed Latin a followed by s, became e or a diphthong, most often ej, while e generally shifted to a schwa (ə) in most regions. This opposition between e and eː makes it possible, for instance, to distinguish past participles orally according to gender and number. Whereas in standard French chassé, chassée, and chassés are pronounced identically, most Gallo speakers distinguish ʃasə for the masculine and ʃase for the feminine and plural forms. In this example, ə indicates a final é, while e indicates that the é is followed by an e or an s. According to this rule, assé became assë asə.

The infinitive of Latin verbs in -are followed the same pattern: captiáre gave chasser ʃasə in Gallo and chasser ʃase in French. This evolution of stressed a varies by region and admits exceptions. In the central area of Upper Brittany, the schwa replaced e, whereas in some peripheral regions it is replaced by ɛ or remains e. Some words do not follow the rule, such as pátre and mátre, which yielded pere peʁ and mere meʁ in most of Upper Brittany; et pere pəʁ and mere məʁ are only heard in the central-western area. Free stressed a before l does not follow the e/eː pattern either and evolved very differently depending on the region. Thus, sále yielded sèl, sél, sé, or seu. The schwa is also used to realize syllabic l and ʁ, as in berton bʁˌtɔ̃.

Pronunciation of the word astour (“now”) according to region.

Like the other langues d'oïl, Gallo was subject to Bartsch's law, according to which free stressed a in contact with a preceding palatal consonant became ie, as in cápra, which became chieuvr. In Gallo as in French, the yodh disappeared around the Renaissance, yielding chèvre and cheuv, and it is now found only in the Côtes-d'Armor. In eastern Brittany, the loss of the yod was stronger than in French, and some speakers say chen instead of chien (from Latin cáne).

Open stressed Latin e also evolved into ie in Gallo as in French, with hĕri yielding, for example, yere. In Gallo, the vowel following the yod varies by region. In most of Upper Brittany it is a schwa, while elsewhere it is ɛ or e; the geographical distribution mirrors that of e/eː. Open stressed Latin o became ue, then monophthongized in both French and Gallo around the 12th century, becoming œ in French and ə in Gallo. Thus, cór gave qheur. The evolution of close stressed Latin e is far more diverse, and the original diphthong éi was replaced by a wide range of phonemes varying by word and region. The many pronunciations of mai, from Latin mé, illustrate this diversity: maj, ma, me, mɛ, etc. The pronunciation of close free stressed Latin o/u is more conservative in Gallo than in other langues d'oïl. Thus, gùla yielded goule in Gallo, but gueule in French. Some terms are nevertheless influenced by neighboring langues d'oïl: astour ("now", from Latin hóra) gives way to asteur in eastern Upper Brittany. In southern Loire-Atlantique, in contact with Poitevin, ɔ is generalized, and one hears guernol and parto instead of guernouille and partout.

	Front		Central	Back
	Unrounded	Rounded	Central	Back
Close	i	y		u
Close-mid	e eː	ø		o
Mid			ə	
Open-mid	ɛ ɛ̃ ɛː	œ œ̃		ɔ ɔ̃
Open	a			ɑ ɑ̃

=== Diphthongs ===
Gallo makes use of diphthongs, like Latin and other langues d'oïl, as well as Romance languages such as Spanish and Portuguese. French, by contrast, has lost its diphthongs since at least the 16th century. Gallo diphthongs generally involve the semivowels w and j, and more rarely ɥ: wa, wə, wi, aw, ja, ju, aj, ej, ɛ̃i, ɥi, ɥɛ̃, ɥə, etc. The triphthong jaw is also attested.

The diphthong aw, which is very common, most often results from the loss of a consonant that existed in Latin. For example, fagu ("beech") became fao, and the hiatus fau developed into a diphthong: faw. In some words such as talpa, l was vocalized as u, and al thus became aw: tawp. In French, by contrast, al merged into o, yielding taupe top. In northern Upper Brittany, diphthongs are used to mark the plural: un martè maʁtə, des martiaos maʁtjaw. In Loire-Atlantique, only the plural form is used.

The nasal diphthong ɛ̃ɔ̃, heard for example in grand (gʁɛ̃ɔ̃, "big"), is typical of western langues d'oïl and is also found in Norman, Poitevin-Saintongeais, and Angevin, sometimes in slightly different forms (aɔ̃ in Saintongeais, ɛ̃ɑ̃ in Norman).

== Writing ==
=== Issues ===
There is still no single writing system that is unanimously approved and widely known. The main difficulty faced by Gallo lies in the differences in pronunciation from one region to another. For example, to say me, Gallo speakers, depending on their region, may say maj, mɛj, mej, ma, mɛ or me. Using French-based spelling, they would therefore write the same word in many different ways: maï, maye, maille, mèï, mey, meille, ma, mé, mè, and so on.

However, the creation of a common system is necessary in order to improve the readability of texts, to represent pronunciation varieties, and to compile a dictionary. The different writing systems that have been proposed can be grouped into two broad tendencies: one favors a single orthography that can be pronounced in different ways while respecting regional variation, while the other proposes numerous letters and letter combinations representing all regional phonemes, allowing speakers to write according to their own pronunciation.

The first effort to codify Gallo orthography was undertaken by the association Amis du parler gallo in 1977. It proposed retaining French spelling while adding specific characters, such as lh to indicate palatalization and ë to represent the schwa. Since then, other systems have emerged, such as ELG, MOGA, ABCD, and BAP.

From an orthographic perspective, two groups can be distinguished: some writing systems propose complex spellings, with silent letters and non-phonetic graphemes, while others are more phonetic and avoid silent letters.

Comparison of several writing systems
Gallo (ELG)	Gallo (Aneit)	Gallo (Vantyé)	Gallo (MOGA)	Gallo (ABCD)	English
Il faut qe j'auj le veir anoet.	I faùt qe j'aùge le vair aneit.	I faw ke j'awj le vèy ane.	I fao qe j'aoje le vaer aneit.	Faot qe j'aoje le vaer anet.	I have to go see him today.

=== ELG orthography ===
ELG orthography (an acronym for écrire le gallo, meaning "write Gallo"), the oldest of the proposed systems, was introduced in 1978 by Alan-Joseph Raude and deliberately rejects reference to French spelling. Raude drew on medieval Gallo texts in order to devise an original orthography, as if Gallo had never ceased to be written. By reusing medieval spellings, ELG also makes it possible to trace Gallo back to its origins, at a time when regional pronunciation differences were less marked than they are today.

Thus, for words meaning finger, evening, or me, which are pronounced differently depending on the region, ELG replaces the French oi with a long e and a short i inherited from Latin. These words are therefore written deit, seir, mei, allowing each speaker to pronounce them according to local usage. Similarly, ruczèu ("stream") is pronounced ʁysəw in the east of Upper Brittany and ʁyzəw in the west, and the ae of Bertaeyn (Brittany) may be pronounced ae, aɛ, aə, and so on. The letter groups oe, cz, tz are other characteristic features of this orthography.

Moreover, final e sounds ceased to be pronounced in Gallo as early as the 12th century, several centuries before French. Raude therefore proposes not writing them. By contrast, silent final consonants are retained in order to facilitate derivation: fauc ("false"), fauchae ("to mow"). Because of the absence of a final e, it must be doubled if it is pronounced. Thus, where French has grand and grande, ELG Gallo has graund and graundd.

ELG has a distinctive visual appearance that gives Gallo a clearly marked identity. However, it is difficult to read and write without prior learning, and even native Gallo speakers do not always immediately recognize it as Gallo. ELG is used, for example, for bilingual French–Gallo signage in a station of the Rennes Metro.

=== Aneit orthography ===
The Aneit system was presented in 1984 by the association Bertègn Galèzz, which succeeded the Amis du parler gallo. This spelling system is the result of five years of research across Upper Brittany and takes its name from the public information booklet Nostre lenghe aneit ("our language today"). Also known as the "unified orthography", it follows the same etymological approach as ELG.

The Aneit system differs from ELG in several respects. For example, every written letter must serve a purpose, which leads to the removal of silent h and double consonants except in specific cases (ll to indicate palatalization, for instance). Aneit shares the same difficulties as ELG, since knowledge of a word's spelling is required in order to read or write it correctly. In addition, Aneit uses the letters ó, ú, and r̃ (r with a tilde), characters that are difficult to access on a standard French keyboard.

=== Vantyé orthography ===
Vantyé orthography was developed by the association of the same name in the early 1980s and is characterized by a desire to bring Gallo spelling closer to Breton. Thus, the sound [k] is represented exclusively by the letter k, rather than by q as used in other systems, and [w] is represented by w: ke for "that" and wézyaw for "bird". Silent letters are abandoned, and a degree of freedom is left to the user.

Vantyé orthography is therefore more of a practical tool than a fully codified spelling system, unlike ELG and Aneit, but it is consequently much easier to master. It nevertheless raises certain issues, as it is primarily intended for speakers of the Mitau area and does not allow all the phonemes used in other regions to be written.

=== MOGA orthographies ===
MOGA orthography was introduced in 2007 by Bèrtran Ôbrée and the association Chubri. Unlike ELG and Aneit, which focus on the etymology of words, MOGA is a phonetic writing system. It also draws on speakers' knowledge of French. Thus, the sound ɲ is represented by gn, as in French, rather than by ny or nh. Likewise, the diphthong aw is written ao, instead of aù or au as in earlier systems, which can be ambiguous since in French the sound w is represented by w. Each letter or group of letters in MOGA corresponds to a single sound.

Regional varieties are taken into account, and letter groups have been created to represent all Gallo phonemes, even if they are used by only a small number of speakers. Thus, lh represents ʎ, a rare phoneme restricted to the central part of the Côtes-d'Armor.

The same word may be spelled in different ways depending on local usage, such as the city of Rennes, which may be written in Gallo in the various MOGA orthographies as Renn, Rènn, Rein·n, or Rin·n (with spelling and pronunciation ranging from the most common to the rarest usages). There is therefore not a single MOGA orthography, but several MOGA orthographies.

=== ABCD orthography ===
ABCD orthography (from the initials of its creators: Régis Auffray, André Bienvenu, André Le Coq, and Patrice Dréano) is used by the Association des enseignants de gallo and at University of Rennes 2. It was standardized in 2009 and adopts the main principles of MOGA: reliance on speakers' knowledge of French and a phonetic approach to writing. Whereas MOGA proposes one sound per letter or letter group, ABCD offers several options so that users can choose among them. This makes it possible to cover regional variants, and a text written in ABCD will not necessarily be read in the same way by all Gallo speakers. ABCD also makes extensive use of French conventions, including silent letters such as s marking the plural, and is therefore very easy to read without prior training.

=== Equivalences between writing systems ===
Equivalences between ELG, MOGA, and ABCD orthographies
Phoneme and French example	ELG	MOGA	ABCD
[ɒ] pâte	a / au (word-final)	â	â / ae
ɑ̃ hanter	aen / an / with labio-velarization: aun	aun (long) / en (short)	am / an / en / em
ə je	ae / aé / aeu / aéy / ei / oe	e	e / ë
ɛ mer	aè / ei / èu / ey (word-final)	è / e (word-final for the epenthetic vowel appearing only due to context)	e / è / ae / ai / aï
e pré	aé / ey (word-final)	é / e (word-final for the epenthetic vowel appearing only due to context)	e / é / ë
eː long é	aé / ey (word-final)	ée	é
ɛ̃ Ain	aen / en / with labio-velarization: aeun / aun / ein	ein (long) / in (short) / iñ (short, word-final) / èn (short after i)	aen / aim / ain / eim / ein
œ fleur	oe / oey	eu	
ø feu	oe / oey	eû	eû / eu
i gris	iy (long) / i (short) / iu	î (long) / i (short)	i
ɔ porte	o	o	o
o gros	o	ô	
ɔ̃ onde	on	on	om / on
u loup	ó / ou	ou	ou / oû
y but	aü / eü / iu / uy (word-final)	û (long) / u (short)	û / u
œ̃ brun	un	ûn	um / un / eum / eun
aj aïe	aè / àè / aéy / ai	aï	ae / aï
ɑj Gallo: mouâi (month)	ei	âï	ây
aw Gallo: chaoz (thing)	au	ao	
ɛj Gallo: pèirr (pear)	aè / ei	èï	ae / aï / é
ɛw Gallo: wézèw (bird)	èu	éw	iao / éou
əɥ Gallo: leù (wolf)	aeü	eù	eû
ɔj Oyez	oy	oï	oy
ɔw ≈ English low	ou	ow	ao
ʒ judo	j (never g)		
k kilo	c / q		c before a, â, o, and ô / q
tʃ tcheque c Prinquiau	q	qh	q before a, â, o, and ô / qh
dʒ djembe ɟ replace the qu of Prinquiau with gu	g	gh	

Phonemes written as in French (a, ch, p...) are not shown in this table. Moreover, since the pronunciation of letters in ELG and ABCD varies greatly by region, this list is not exhaustive.

In addition, the MOGA and ABCD systems use the combination ll in words that are palatalized by some Gallo speakers. Thus, bllë is pronounced bjə or blə depending on the region. In ABCD, the combinations mm, nm, and nn are not pronounced as in French, since the first letter serves to nasalize the vowel and only the second letter is pronounced: fenme is pronounced fɑ̃m and not fenm, and Janne is pronounced ʒɑ̃n and not ʒan. As in French, if the final letter is an e or a consonant, it is generally not pronounced.

In MOGA, lj is written lh, and ñ replaces n to show that it must not be nasalized: (il) diñra is pronounced dinʁa, as in French.

In ELG orthography, certain letters and letter groups can only appear in specific positions, such as oey, which exists only at the end of a word. As in ABCD, final consonants in ELG are generally silent. The sound s is written cz, c, ç, or s depending on its position in the word and the surrounding letters. In word-final position, its silent equivalent is tz.

== Grammar ==
=== Determiners, pronouns, and prepositions ===
Articles in Gallo are almost the same as in French: le, la, les, eun, eune, des. The partitive article du also exists. The neutral pronoun ce does not exist, and cela can be replaced by eci or ela.

The order of personal pronoun objects in a sentence can differ from French. When there are two object pronouns in a clause, one direct object and one indirect object, the indirect object comes first. Thus, in Gallo one says je li l'ai donnë for "I gave it to him". This rule also applies in the imperative: donne maï le for "give it to me".

Demonstrative pronouns derive from the Latin iste: sti-ci, sti-là (masculine) and ste-ci, ste-là (feminine). The plural is closer to French: s(t)eus-ci, s(t)eus-là. Relative and interrogative pronouns are similar to those of French (qui/que); they mainly differ in pronunciation, since most Gallo speakers use affricates or the voiceless palatal stop instead of the voiceless velar stop. Thus ke and ki become cə/tʃə and ci/tʃi. Moreover, the distinction between animate and inanimate referents is not systematic: qhi qe tu vis ? can mean either "whom did you see?" or "what did you see?". In western Upper Brittany, however, the distinction is mandatory, and cai ("what") is used to refer to an inanimate object.

Redundant use of the possessive with a is common: sés chevaos a li ("his horses, his"). The preposition a placed before an infinitive produces a similar emphatic effect and can also be used in a sentence describing two simultaneous actions, where French uses the gerund: i coure a veni ("he comes running"). Demonstrative pronouns are replaced by possessives: le sien replaces celui à/qui/que/de. For example, le sien qi veut means "the one who wants".

The French word avec ("with") is expressed in Gallo in several ways depending on context. The preposition o or d'o is used to describe an action involving a thing, a human, or an animal, as in aler és clloz d'o son chen ("to go to the fields with one's dog"), or in the context of a passive relationship between two humans, as in yètr d'assant d'o qheuq'eun ("to agree with someone"). The preposition cant or cantë is used for an action between two humans: yètr a caozer cantë son bonaminz ("to be talking with one's friend").

Gallo pronouns
			personal pronoun					possessive pronoun
			subject	reflexive	Direct object (preposed)	Direct object (postposed)	Indirect object	possessive pronoun
first person	singular		je	me	me	mai	me	mine (masc.), mine (fem.), mine (pl.)
first person	plural		je/on/nan	nous	nous/n-s-aotrs	nous/n-s-aotrs	nous/n-s-aotrs	ours (masc.), ours (fem.), ours (pl.)
second person	singular		tu	te	te	tai/ta	te	yours (masc.), yours (fem.), yours (pl.)
second person	plural		vous/v-s/v'	vous/vs	vous/v'/v-s-aotrs	vous/v-s-aotrs	vous/v-s-aotrs	yours (masc.), yours (fem.), yours (pl.)
third person	singular	masculine	i/il	se	le	le	li/yi	his (masc.), his (fem.), his (pl.)
third person	singular	feminine	ol/o/al/a/el/e	se	la/las	la	li/yi	hers (masc.), hers (fem.), hers (pl.)
third person	singular	neuter	on/nen	se	–	–	–	–
third person	plural	masculine	il/i/iz	se	les/ls	les	lou/you/yeu	theirs (masc.), theirs (fem.), theirs (pl.)
third person	plural	feminine	i/ol/o/al/a/e	se	les/ls	les	lou/you/yeu	theirs (masc.), theirs (fem.), theirs (pl.)

=== Gender and number ===
As in French, nouns in Gallo can be masculine or feminine and singular or plural. The gender of nouns is generally the same as in French, with a few exceptions such as aje ("age"), bole ("bowl"), and crabe ("crab"), which are feminine, and memouere ("memory") and vipere ("viper"), which are masculine.

Feminine marking is expressed in several ways depending on the word. In some cases, as in French, the final consonant becomes voiced: petit becomes petite, and vaizin becomes vaizine. In words ending in a nasal vowel, this vowel may be denasalised, as in French bon/bonne. Agent nouns derived from verbs and ending in -ou, such as chantou, take endings in -ouze, -ouère, or -resse (eune chantouère, "a female singer"). Finally, words ending in non-silent consonants, doubled consonants, or developed consonant clusters (-ch, -sch, etc.) are invariable.

Plural formation is also governed by several different rules. Words ending in a consonant remain invariable, whereas those ending in a vowel may lengthen that vowel: un crochet [kʁoʃɛ], des crochets [kʁoʃɛː]. Other words form the plural with a diphthong, such as chatè ("castle"), which becomes chatiao, or by vowel alternation, such as pommier [pɔ̃mjə], which becomes pommiérs [pɔ̃mje]. In Loire-Atlantique, the diphthongal plural does not exist, and the diphthongal form is always used: chatéo ("castle", singular and plural). Le mondd ("people, everyone") is invariable and expresses a collective plural; the verb that follows must therefore be conjugated in the plural. Adjectives rarely distinguish between singular and plural forms.

=== Conjugation ===
Conjugation in Gallo is characterised by the importance of the simple past in spoken language. Verbs in this tense fall into four groups. Most verbs, such as hucher ("to shout"), are conjugated with endings in -i: je huchis, tu huchis, etc. There are variations for the first and third person plural: -imes or -ites for we, and -ites or -irant for they. Verbs ending in -air(e) or -aer, such as baire or chaer, take endings in -û: je chûs, vous chûtes, etc. The first and third person plural follow the same variation patterns as verbs in -i. Finally, there are also a few verbs in -u, such as vair, and in -in, such as veni and prindr. The verb avair ("to have") belongs to the -i group, but it can also take endings from the -û and -u groups. The verb to be has two forms, je fus/sus, due to a change of stem.

The endings in -i, such as j'apërchis and je venis, corresponding to French j'aperçus and je vins, illustrate the closeness of Gallo to Latin for verbs originating from the third and fourth Latin conjugations. For the perfect endings of first-group Latin verbs, French retained the linking vowel, whereas Gallo retained the final ending:

Verb meaning	Latin	Gallo	French
To fall	cecidit	i cheyit	il chuta
To throw	jecit	i jetit	il jeta
To fix	fixit	i fixit	il fixa
To ring	sonavit	i sonnit	il sonna
To wash	lavavit	i lavit	il lava

The endings of verbs in the present indicative are simple, as they are the same for all verbs, with a few exceptions such as to be. Regular verbs are conjugated by keeping the stem for the singular forms and adding -ons or -om for we, and -éz for you (plural). For the third person plural, usage varies: either the stem takes no ending, or -ant or -aint is added.

The imperfect is formed with the stem and endings similar to those of French, though pronunciation can vary greatly between regions, ranging for example from je manjë to je manjay or je manjéy. As with the simple past, the first and third person plural are subject to variation: -ions, -é, or -iom for we, and -é, -a, -ay, or -yon for they. The older form -ao for the first two persons singular (je manjao) is attested in Bourseul, where it is also used to conjugate the conditional mood, and -yain for the first person plural appears in proverbs.

The endings of the future tense and the conditional are the same for all verbs and are similar to those of French. The present subjunctive is formed with the suffix -j.

The conditional mood is used in subordinate clauses introduced by si ("if") expressing hypothesis, whereas French requires the imperfect indicative ("les si n'aiment pas les rai"). In Gallo, for example, one says si qheuqu'un seraet venu. The conditional also replaces the subjunctive in purpose clauses introduced by pour ("in order to").

The imperative mood is formed using the endings of the present indicative, except for a few irregular verbs such as veni ("to come"): ataï ! ("come!"), atous ! ("come!" plural).

Interrogation is expressed by means of the particle ti, which is placed after the verb: j'ons-ti le dret d'aler vair ? ("Do I have the right to go and see?"). In indirect questions, qe is inserted before the subject: Den cai qe tu sonjes ? ("What are you thinking about?").

The prefix entre-, which marks reciprocity ("to help each other"), is a true morpheme in Gallo and can therefore be freely used with a large number of verbs: Les chens s'entr-taint mordus means "the dogs had bitten each other". It accompanies the reflexive pronoun and can be separated from the verb by an auxiliary or an object pronoun. The reflexive voice can also be used to indicate a process without an agent or internal to the person: i s'apernaet means "he was learning by himself".

Verb	Present indicative	Imperfect	Simple past	Future	Conditional	Present subjunctive	Present participle	Past participle
yètr (to be)	je së/sé t'es il/ol ét je sons/sôme vous etes il/ol sont	je taes tu taes i/o taet je tions/tains vous tiéz i taent	je fus/sus tu fus/sus i/ol fut/sut je fumes/sumes vous futes/sutes i/ol furent/surant	je serë tu serâs i/ol sera je serons vous seréz i/ol seront	je serës tu serës i/ol serët je serions/serans vous seriez i/ol serant	qe je seje qe tu sejes q'i/o seje qe je sejions qe vous sejiéz q'i/ol sejent/sejant	etant	të
enveyer (to send)	j'enveye t'enveyes il/ol enveye j'enveyons v'enveyéz il enveyent/enveyant	j'enveyaes t'enveyaes il/ol enveyaet j'enveyons/enveyains v'enveyiéz il enveyent/enveyant	j'enveyis t'enveyis il/ol enveyit j'enveyimes v'enveyites il enveyirent	j'enveyerë t'enveyerâs il/ol enveyera j'enveyerons v'enveyeréz il enveyeront	j'enveyrës t'enveyerës il/ol enveyerët j'enveyerions/enveyerant v'enveyeriéz il enveyeraent	qe j'enveyeje qe t'enveyejes q'il/ol enveyeje qe j'enveyejions qe v'enveyejiéz q'il enveyejent/enveyejant	enveyant	enveyë
crere (to believe)	je cres tu cres i/o cret je creyons vous creyéz i creyent/crevent/crezent/cressent	je creyaes tu creyaes i/o creyaet je creyons/creyains vous creyiéz i creyaent	je creyis/crû tu creyis/crûs il/ol creyit/crût je creyimes/crûmes vous creyites/crûtes i creyirent/crûrant	je crerë tu crerâs il/ol crera je crerons vous creréz i creront	je crerës tu crerës i/o crerët je crerions/crerant vous creriéz i crerant	qe je creje qe tu crejes q'i/o creje qe je crejions qe vous crejiéz q'i crejent/crejant	creyant	crû

== Lexicon ==
=== Romance base ===
Gallo is an Oïl language, and its vocabulary, like its grammar, derives largely from Vulgar Latin. Lexical items inherited from Latin are also found in Old French and in other Oïl languages, and some terms were carried overseas to Quebec, such as ferdillouz ("chilly, sensitive to cold"), which is used for example in the Magdalen Islands in the Gulf of Saint Lawrence.

Words in Gallo inherited from Latin do not necessarily have direct equivalents in French, such as sicot, which denotes the stump of a cut plant and derives from Vulgar Latin ciccotu (compare French "chicot"). Other terms, such as merien, meaning "nap", also derive from Vulgar Latin (compare French "méridienne"), although the corresponding French word is not inherited from Latin ("sieste" is a borrowing from Spanish). Finally, some words come from Classical Latin, such as subller, which derives from sibilāre. The French equivalent siffler comes instead from Vulgar Latin sifilāre. The verb chomë, from Latin caumāre, has retained its original meaning "to lack", but it also has other meanings such as "to raise" or "to set upright". It can be used reflexively, with se chomë meaning "to stand up", and as a present participle, en chomant meaning "while remaining standing". The noun chomant also means "skeleton".

Examples of terms of Romance origin:

- anet (today; Latin: hodie)
- astoure, asteure (now; contraction of à cette heure; Latin: hac hōra)
- biqe, biqhe (doe, goat; Latin: beccus)
- bobia (foolish, simple-minded; medieval onomatopoeia bob)
- avette (bee; Latin: apis)
- chaer (to fall; Latin: cadēre)
- cherdi (to caress; Latin: carus)
- chomer (to raise, to set upright; Latin: caumāre)
- corner (to sing; from corne, "horn")
- crouiller (to lock; derived from écrou)
- ferzae (barn owl; Latin: praesāga)
- frilouz, ferdillouz (chilly; Latin: frilosus)
- goule (mouth, muzzle, face; Latin: gŭla)
- grôle (crow; Latin: gracŭla)
- guerouer (to freeze; Latin: gelāre)
- hane (trousers, garment; Latin: habitus)
- hucher (to shout; Vulgar Latin: huccāre)
- mézë, demézë, ademézë (from now on; Latin: magis, with prefixes ad and de)
- mitan (middle; Latin: medius)
- ouaille (ewe; Latin: ovis) (Loire-Atlantique)
- perchaine (next; Latin: proximus)
- paire (pear; Latin: pira)
- pllée (rain; Latin: plŏia)
- qhette (leg, thigh; Latin: coxa)
- soulai, sourai (sun; Gaulish Latin: *solicŭlu)
- terjous, tourjous (always; medieval contraction of tout and jours)
- tenant (always; Latin: tenire) (Morbihan)
- ventiés (perhaps; contraction of volontiers)

=== Celtic substrate ===
Gallo has a significant Celtic substrate, inherited mainly from Gaulish but also from Breton, which distinguishes it from other Oïl languages. Because of similarities between Breton and Gaulish, it is sometimes difficult to determine the precise Celtic etymology of Gallo words. Borrowings from Breton are more common near the linguistic border. A term of Celtic origin used at the eastern edge of Upper Brittany is therefore more likely to derive from Gaulish than from Breton.

The word pobran ("buttercup") is used only along the Atlantic coast, from the Gulf of Morbihan to the Pays de Retz via the Loire estuary; the word berlu ("foxglove") is not used beyond Saint-Brieuc and Ploërmel; and trinchon ("sorrel") is not heard east of Lamballe, Redon and Blain. For its part, bran ("cereal bran"), which is not used beyond Fougères, Rennes and Redon, resembles the Breton brenn, but it derives from Latin brennus, which itself may come from a Gaulish term.

In general, Breton has borrowed far more words from Gallo than Gallo has borrowed from Breton. Thus, brochë ("to knit"), which comes from Latin brocca, gave rise to Breton brochenn ("knitting needle").

Examples of terms of Celtic origin:

- balai (broom, broom shrub; Gaulish: *balagiu, *banatlo or *balayum)
- beroui (burnt; Breton: berviñ "to boil")
- berlu (foxglove; Breton: brulu)
- boettë (to bait; Breton: boued "food")
- bourrië (waste, refuse; Gaulish: *borua)
- cante, cantë, catë, conte (with; Gaulish: *cata-)
- cariquelle (cart, barrow; Breton: karrigell)
- craïssant (crossroads; Breton: kroashent)
- qhuter (to hide; Gaulish: *cud-)
- drôe (darnel; Gaulish: *drauca)
- grôe (ice, frost; Gaulish: *grava)
- margate (cuttlefish; Breton: morgat)
- nâche (stall for cattle in a cowshed; Gaulish: *nasca)
- oualer (to weep; Breton: gouelañ)
- pobran (buttercup; Breton: pav-bran)
- pllé (scion; Gaulish: *pláxa)
- piece (field; Gaulish: *pĕttia)
- trinchon (sorrel; Breton: triñchon)

=== Germanic superstrate ===
The lexicon of Germanic origin in Gallo derives largely from Frankish, the language of the Franks. The Franks occupied the eastern part of Brittany from the 5th century onward and gradually assimilated into the local populations.

Examples of terms of Germanic origin:

- broû, brao (ivy; Frankish: *brŭst-)
- fer (straw; Frankish: *fŏdr) (Côtes-d'Armor)
- greyer (to harness, to equip; Old Norse: *greja)
- jou, joc, jouqe (perch; Frankish: jŭk)
- loje, loche (shed, hangar; Frankish: *laubja)
- ro, rou (osier; Frankish: raus)

== Bibliography ==
- Chauveau, Jean-Paul (1984). Le gallo : une présentation [Gallo: an introduction] (in French). Section de celtique, Faculté des lettres de Brest, Université de Bretagne occidentale. p. 252.
- Chauveau, Jean-Paul (1989). Évolutions phonétiques en gallo [Phonetic evolutions in Gallo]. Sciences du langage (in French). Paris: Centre national de la recherche scientifique. p. 293. ISBN 2-222-04281-X.
- Leray, Christian; Lorand, Ernestine (1995). Dynamique interculturelle et autoformation : une histoire de vie en Pays gallo [Intercultural dynamics and self-learning: a life story in Gallo country]. Défi-formation (in French). Paris: L'Harmattan. p. 385. ISBN 2-7384-3377-4.
- Ôbrée, Bertran (1998). Les sonantes et la syllabe en gallo [Sonorants and the syllable in Gallo] (in French). Université de Rennes 2 Haute-Bretagne.
- Deriano, Patrik (2005). Grammaire du gallo [Grammar of Gallo] (in French). Ploudalmézeau: Label LN. p. 457. ISBN 2-915915-08-3.
