= Corcoué-sur-Logne =

Corcoué-sur-Logne Corcóaé (Gallo) Kerc'haoueg (Breton)
- Commune
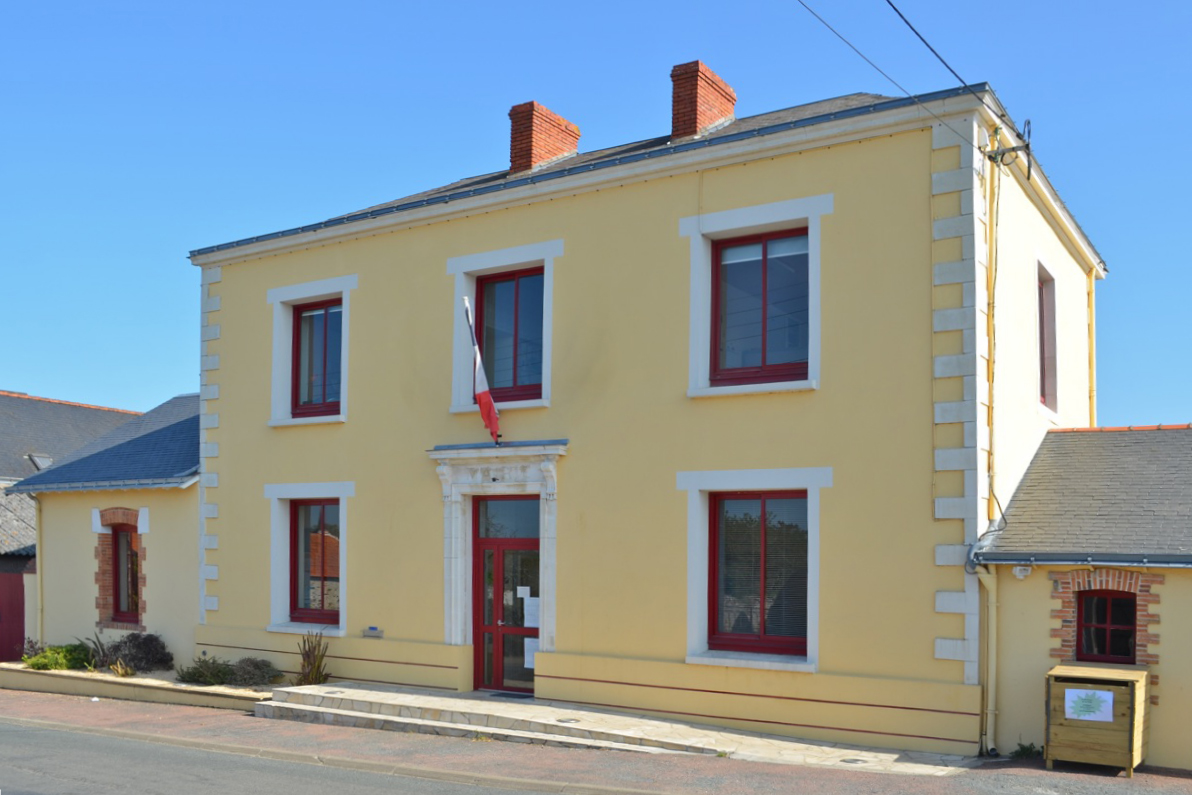
- Town hall

- Coat of arms
- Location of Corcoué-sur-Logne
- Location within France Location within Pays de la Loire
- Coordinates: 46°57′59″N 1°34′33″W
- Country: France
- Region: Pays de la Loire
- Department: Loire-Atlantique
- Arrondissement: Nantes
- Canton: Saint-Philbert-de-Grand-Lieu
- Intercommunality: Sud Retz Atlantique

Government
  - Mayor (2020–2026): Claude Naud
- Area^{1}: 50.39 km^{2} (19.46 sq mi)
- Highest elevation: 69 m (226 ft)
- Lowest elevation: 10 m (33 ft)
- Population (2023): 3,265
  - Density: 64.79/km^{2} (167.8/sq mi)
- Time zone: UTC+01:00 (CET)
  - Summer (DST): UTC+02:00 (CEST)
- INSEE/Postal code: 44156 /44650
- ^{1} French Land Register data, which excludes lakes, ponds, glaciers > 1 km^{2} (0.386 sq mi or 247 acres) and river estuaries.

Corcoué-sur-Logne (French pronunciation: [kɔʁkwe syʁ lɔɲ]; Gallo: Corcóaé, Breton: Kerc'haoueg) is a commune in the Loire-Atlantique department in western France. It was created in 1971 by the merger of two former communes: Saint-Étienne-de-Corcoué and Saint-Jean-de-Corcoué.

== Population ==
The population data given in the table and graph below for 1968 and earlier refer to the former commune of Saint-Étienne-de-Corcoué.

Historical population

Year	Pop.	±% p.a.
1800	900	—
1821	1,108	+0.99%
1846	1,360	+0.82%
1872	1,383	+0.06%
1901	1,422	+0.10%
1926	1,147	−0.86%
1946	1,019	−0.59%
1962	1,022	+0.02%
1968	1,029	+0.11%

Year	Pop.	±% p.a.
1975	1,812	+8.42%
1982	1,918	+0.82%
1990	1,959	+0.26%
1999	1,990	+0.17%
2007	2,351	+2.11%
2012	2,664	+2.53%
2017	2,927	+1.90%
2023	3,265	+1.84%

Source: EHESS and INSEE (1975-2023)

== See also ==
- Communes of the Loire-Atlantique department
