= Language border =

Geolinguistic boundary between mutually intelligible speech communities

Linguistic boundary of Brittany between Celtic-speaking (west) and Romance-speaking (east) Brittany.

A language border or language boundary is the line separating two language areas. The term is generally meant to imply a lack of mutual intelligibility between the two languages. If two adjacent languages or dialects are mutually intelligible, no firm border will develop, because the two languages can continually exchange linguistic inventions; this is known as a dialect continuum. A "language island" is a language area that is completely surrounded by a language border.

== Important concepts ==
The concept of mutual intelligibility is vague. More important, it can be difficult for non-native speakers to distinguish one language from another similar one. Furthermore, there is no clear definition of what constitutes a language: for instance some languages share writing systems but are spoken differently, while others are identical when spoken but are written using different alphabets. For example, different "dialects" of Chinese use the same characters with the same meanings, but these can be pronounced very differently in different varieties. Japanese also uses large numbers of Kanji characters (of Chinese origin) to mean the same as in Chinese, but they often have different "readings" (yomi) some of which may be pronounced as in Chinese while others are totally different.

There are often also shared terms between two languages even between languages that have nothing to do with each other.

For example, Spanish is spoken in most Central American and South American countries, but also in Spain. There are subtle but recognizable differences between the dialects, but there are different dialects even within the country of Spain. (In many cultures there also slight differences between the versions of the language, both spoken and written ("registers") used in different contexts: for example when talking to one's boss and talking to one's friends.)

== Difficulties ==
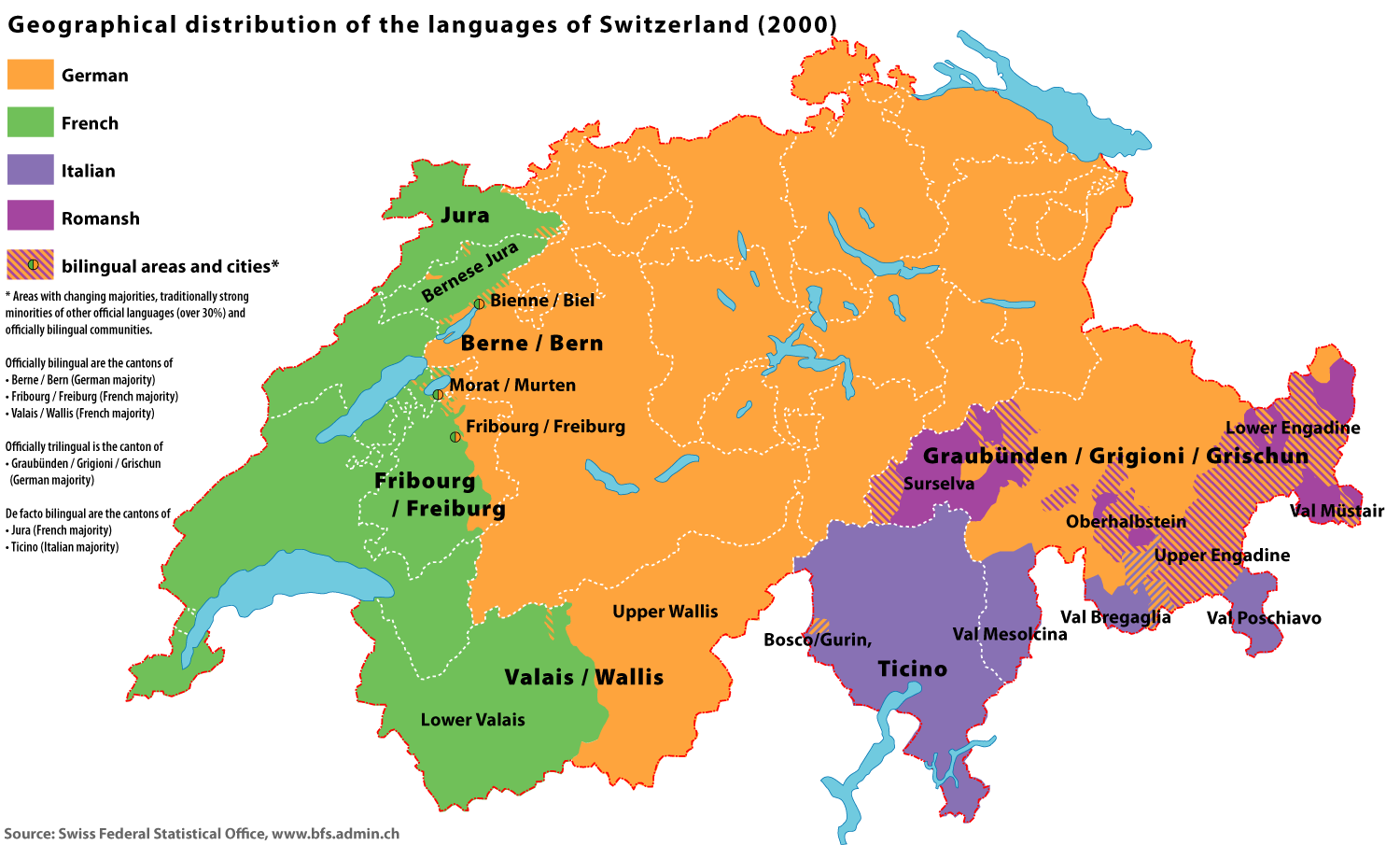
Röstigraben in Switzerland

There can also be people within a country who speak the "native" language of a different country, some of whom may be bilingual. Also, an inherited language may evolve and perhaps absorb some of the characteristics or terms of the new area's predominant language. In cases such as these, it becomes even more difficult to identify specific languages.

When speakers have a foreign accent, they are often perceived to be less intelligent and are less likely to be hired. It is the same with an accent from a peripheral area, rather than the accent from the urbanized core: a peripheral person is typically perceived as speaking a "less correct" by those who are more educated, while those who are not as educated do not perceive any difference in the "correctness". Colonial histories could also help this phenomenon.

A well-known example of a language border is the border between Romance and Germanic languages that stretches through Belgium, France, Switzerland, and Italy.

== Politics and language borders ==
=== European expansion ===
Language borders do not always reflect political borders; the tendency to correlate language with nationality is a common error that seems to have arisen during the period of 19th century European expansion (e.g., the term Anglo in Mexico and the southeastern U.S., or the term Angrez – literally, "English" – in North India). The usage of a particular language can reflect positively or negatively on its speaker depending upon the situation.

For example, there is perception in the USA that only English speakers are American and only non-Americans are non-English-speakers. It is suspected that this assumption began because states would have "official" languages for the purposes of book publishing and therefore for the purposes of education, so intelligence would come to be associated with speaking the language that was written. Because of this idea, there are also often social benefits which result from being able to speak English. A prime example of this is the prevalence of bilingualism near the U.S.–Mexican border, which also indicates the porosity of the border and illustrates the difficulty of drawing a "border" around all speakers of a given language, especially because there is not usually much correlation between ethnicity and language. Such common bilingualism leads to the practice of code-switching, or the changing freely between languages while speaking although this trait is somewhat looked down upon because those living in areas of frequent code-switching seem to develop a sort of language loyalty.

=== Colonialism ===
Another example of the difference between language borders and political borders is the spread of languages via colonialism, causing languages to be spoken in multiple, not necessarily adjacent countries.

=== Other examples ===
Although language borders and political borders do not always agree, there have been many instances where political leadership has attempted to enforce language borders. In the Mexican city of Ciudad Juarez on the border with the United States, social efforts have been made to curb the amount of American influence taking place—but at the same time, as in other foreign cultures, the class benefits of English proficiency are acknowledged and to this end schools teach in English and many television channels are in English. The use of Breton and Welsh has historically been discouraged by French and British governments respectively. There are also instances of intolerance to the speaking of Native American languages at some schools, thus forcing those students to create small communities in which they can speak their native language, thereby creating "language boundaries" on a very small scale. Examples like these illustrate the impact that language boundaries can have on cultural boundaries, even if they are not necessarily one and the same.

== See also ==
- Isogloss
- Language island
- Linguistic geography
- Language contact
- Adstratum
