= Saint-Quirin =

- Commune
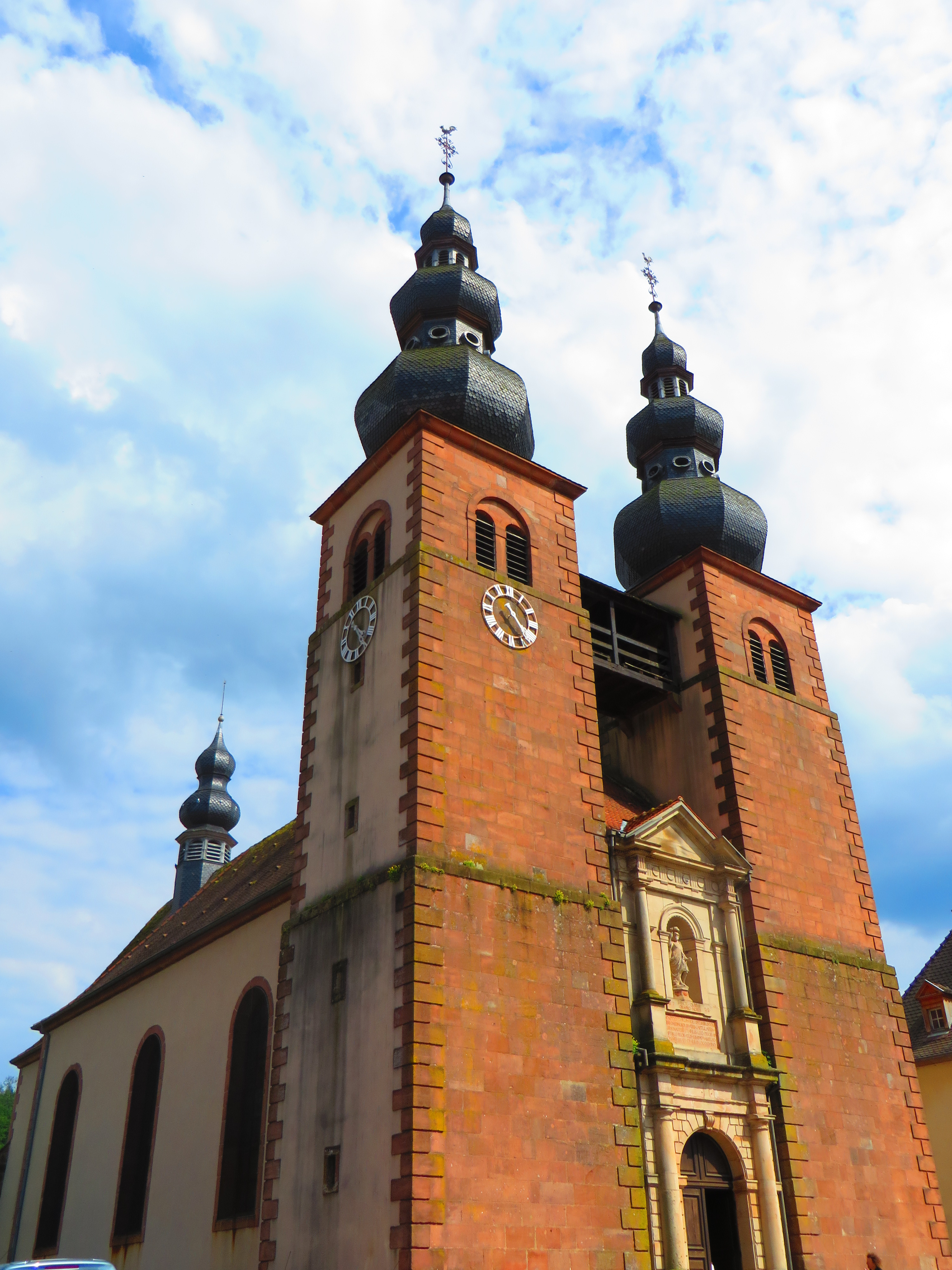
- The church in Saint-Quirin

- Coat of arms
- Location of Saint-Quirin
- Location within France Location within Grand Est
- Coordinates: 48°36′39″N 7°03′55″E
- Country: France
- Region: Grand Est
- Department: Moselle
- Arrondissement: Sarrebourg-Château-Salins
- Canton: Phalsbourg

Government
  - Mayor (2020–2026): Karine Collingro
- Area^{1}: 53.34 km^{2} (20.59 sq mi)
- Elevation: 316 m (1,037 ft)
- Highest elevation: 897 m (2,943 ft)
- Lowest elevation: 282 m (925 ft)
- Population (2023): 692
  - Density: 13.0/km^{2} (33.6/sq mi)
- Time zone: UTC+01:00 (CET)
  - Summer (DST): UTC+02:00 (CEST)
- INSEE/Postal code: 57623 /57560
- ^{1} French Land Register data, which excludes lakes, ponds, glaciers > 1 km^{2} (0.386 sq mi or 247 acres) and river estuaries.

Saint-Quirin (French pronunciation: [sɛ̃ kiʁɛ̃]; German: Sankt Quirin) is a commune in the Moselle department in Grand Est in north-eastern France. It is a member of Les Plus Beaux Villages de France (The Most Beautiful Villages of France) Association.

== See also ==
- Communes of the Moselle department
