= Arianese dialect =

Romance dialect spoken in Ariano Irpino county

Arianese
- Native to: Italy (Ariano Irpino)
- Region: Campania
- Language family: Indo-European: Italic; Latino-Faliscan; Latin; Romance; Italo-Western; Italo-Dalmatian; Italo-Romance; Neapolitan; Irpinian; Arianese

Language codes
- ISO 639-3: None (mis)
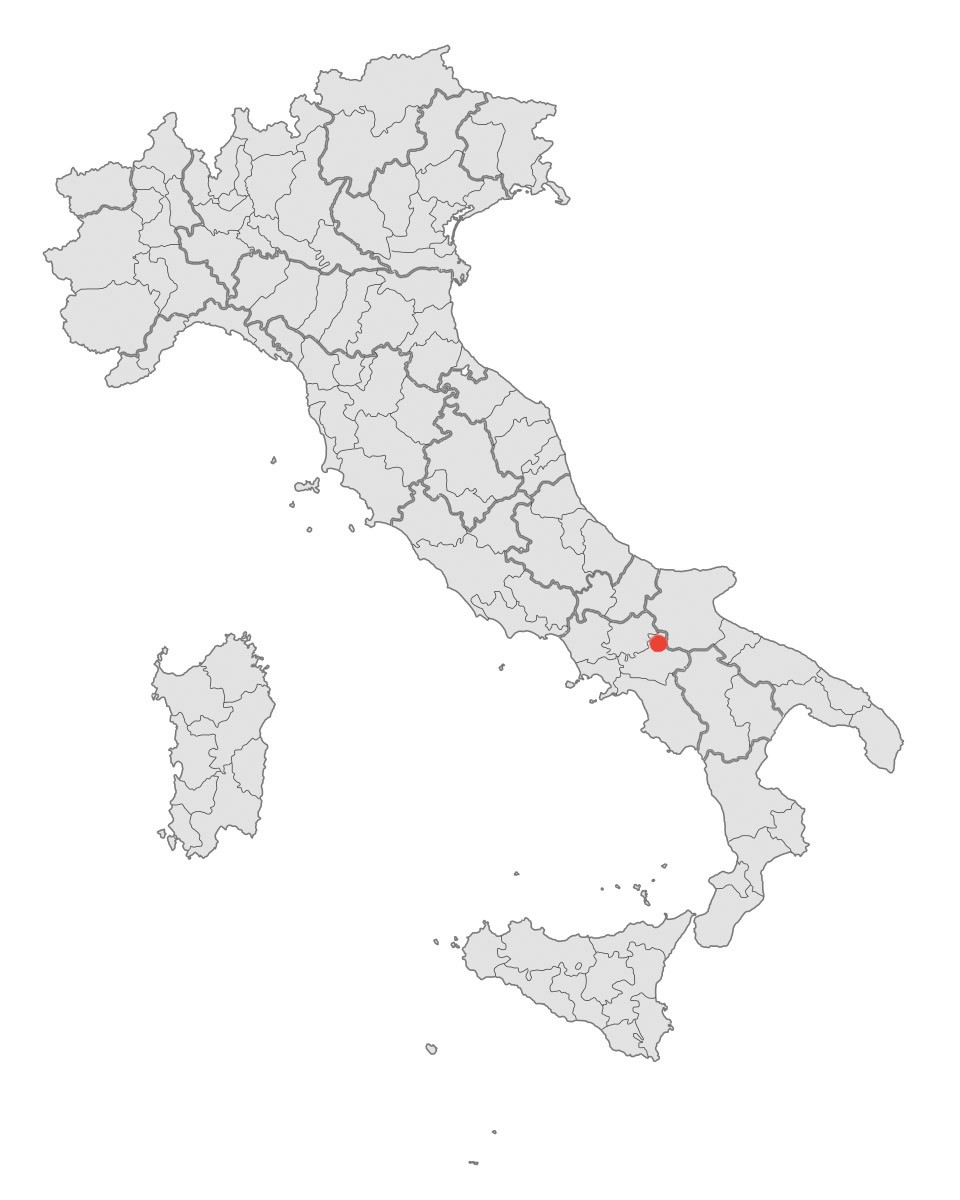
- The diffusion area of the Arianese dialect (in red) within the Italian territory

The Arianese dialect, typical of the territorial area of Ariano Irpino, is a vernacular variety of the Irpinian dialect, belonging in turn to the Neapolitan group of southern Italian dialects. Like all Romance languages, it descends directly from Vulgar Latin, a language of Indo-European stock that has been widespread in the area since Roman times.

== Geographic context ==
The characteristics of the Arianese dialect appear rather atypical compared to the usual Irpinia vernacular canons by virtue of the geographical position of the town, located along the northern edge of Irpinia at the height of the main pass of the Campanian Apennines (the so-called saddle of Ariano), therefore in the extreme hinterland of Campania and immediately close to the Dauno-Apulian side. The Arianese dialect was able to resist relatively better the contamination of the lower Campania region in general and the Neapolitan one in particular (Naples became the capital of the Kingdom since the 13th century), but it remained exposed in some measure to the Apulian (and more precisely Daunian) dialectal influences, rather evident above all at a phonetic level. For similar reasons, there is also a certain influence of the Irpinia dialects, and especially for the Arianese dialect, on the vernaculars spoken along the Apulian side of the Daunia mountains (the so-called Dauno-Irpinia dialects) and even, albeit only superficially, on the linguistic islands present there. It should also be noted the presence of a certain contact with the large Benevento dialect area, mainly attributable to the geographical proximity as well as to the Early Medieval historical events. Since the first half of the 19th century, however, Arianese has been considered one of the main dialects of the entire Campanian group.

== Historical context ==
Conspicuous was the historical importance of the county of Ariano which, in medieval times, extended on both sides of the Apennines, so much so that under the Norman domain it became a great county (within the vast County of Apulia and Calabria) and expanded as far as at the gates of Benevento on one side and up to the threshold of the Tavoliere on the other; moreover Ariano itself was elevated to ducal seat from 1495, and from 1585 to royal city, the only one in the whole Principiato Ultra (within which it was by far the most populous center). The role played by the great traffic routes was also fundamental, such as the medieval via Francigena and the modern Apulian royal road as well as the ancient routes of transhumance: the tratturo Pescasseroli-Candela (to which a modest lexical influence from Abruzzo is also attributable) and the tratturello Camporeale-Foggia.

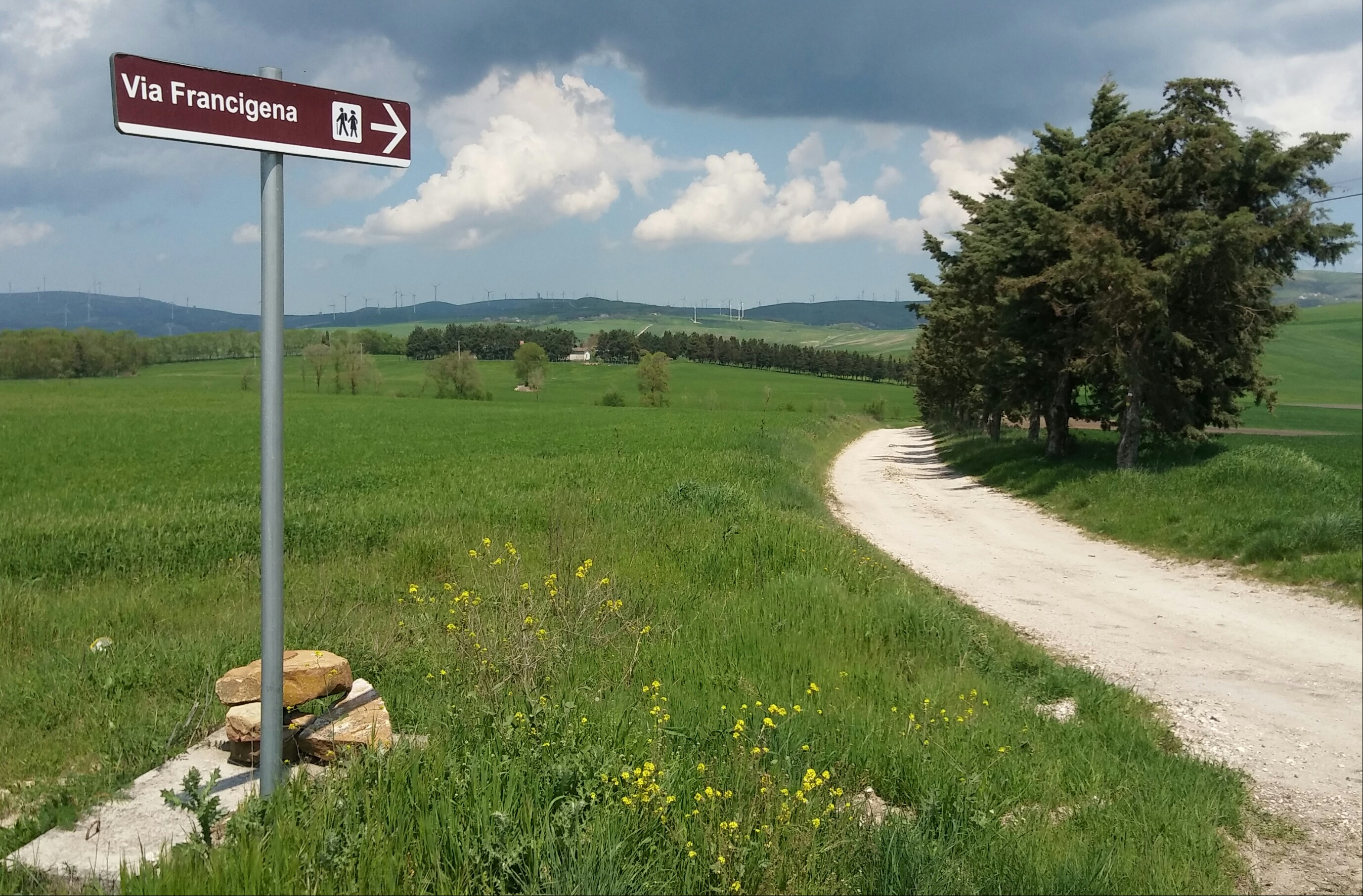
The Via Francigena in the direction of Puglia on the Sprinia plateau, near the homonymous masseria in the upper Miscano valley.

In the context of the Kingdom of Naples, the town was then nicknamed "la chiave delle puglie" (the key to Apulia) as it was an essential key in the connections between the capital Naples and the nearby Apulian provinces, with which there were intense contacts and exchanges: in addition to this, in the 15th century there was a massive influx of refugees from Trani, who settled in the extramural village which took its name from them ("Tranìsi", i.e. "Tranesi", people from Trani); this rock quarter would later house the numerous Ariano Irpino ceramics kilns, and it is precisely on some locally produced glazed ceramic tiles (dated 1772 and depicting big-game hunting scenes) that we find the first written attestations of the Arianese dialect, consisting in a complex series of covertly licentious or allusive slang expressions and as such not always easily interpretable. However, dialectal inflections, already significantly permeated by elements of Apulian origin, emerge from much more ancient times and even in documents of the early Middle Ages written in the local vulgar Latin.

It should also be considered that the diocese of Ariano, from the moment of its establishment and until the great schism, followed the Byzantine Rite similarly to the Apulian dioceses, although it depended on a Longobard archbishopric such as that of Benevento. And it is also significant that until 1930 the city was known under the eloquent denomination of Ariano di Puglia, made official starting from 1868 but already in use for many centuries by writers (even in the medieval Latin form Arianum in Apulia) although the local vernacular has always favored the simple original form Ariano, attested as far back as 782.

== Phonology ==
Among the salient features of the local dialect is the pronunciation of the tonic e / o vowels which, due to a partial syllabic isochronism of clear Adriatic origin, are generally closed in a free syllable in plain words, unlike than in the rest of Irpinia where the open stamp prevails. Therefore in Ariano it's said: "la mugliéra téne nóve sóre" (= "the wife has nine sisters"), whereas in the standard Irpinia it's have "(l) a muglièra tene nòve sòre". On the other hand, in slippery words the local pronunciation of the tonic vowels tends to reopen, as is well evident in the case of nouns combined with enclitic possessives: "muglièrima" (="my wife"), "sòreta" (="your sister").

Peculiar, and likely attributable to an Apulian influence, is also the way of pronouncing the tonic vowel a which in Ariano tends towards e while elsewhere in Irpinia it tends rather towards o, especially in a free or final syllable; thus, for example, the word "fare" is pronounced /fæ:/ in Arianese, /fɑː/ in standard Irpino.

Consider also, in compound tenses, the anomalous vowel alternation in the different persons of the auxiliary verb:

- à ritto (="hai detto", "you said")
- è dditto (="ha detto", "he/she/it said");

actually, while the first construct probably derives from the trivial truncation of a primitive *ài ritto (this can be deduced from the lack of syntactic gemination of the following syllable), the second would instead have originated from an ancient *à dditto. In other cases the local use of the stressed vowels a / e in the pronunciation of an auxiliary verb is instead freely interchangeable and independent of external factors: thus, for example, one can say "àggiu capito" or "èggiu capito" (="ho capito", "i understood"), without there being any difference in meaning between the two expressions.

At a purely orthographic level, in addition to the almost systematic omission of the etymological h in the conjugated forms of the auxiliary verb "avere", we note the frequent use of the letter j (and sometimes also of the w) to indicate a semiconsonant in initial or intervocalic position, while the graphemes š and ẓ (or similar ones) are often used to signal respectively the possible palatalization of s (in a preconsonantal position) and the rather infrequent sonorization of z.

Overall, however, the differences between the Arianese dialect and the various vernaculars widespread in the small neighboring towns are quite evident (although not excessively profound), where the typical Irpinia cadences tend to be preserved in an even more genuine way, in fact in the rest of Irpinia it is said everywhere à dditto. although even these appear more or less dissimilar from each other, sometimes altered by a usually inconspicuous slang component but in some cases very well marked (an example is given by the slang ciaschino, once spoken in the nearby Baronia).

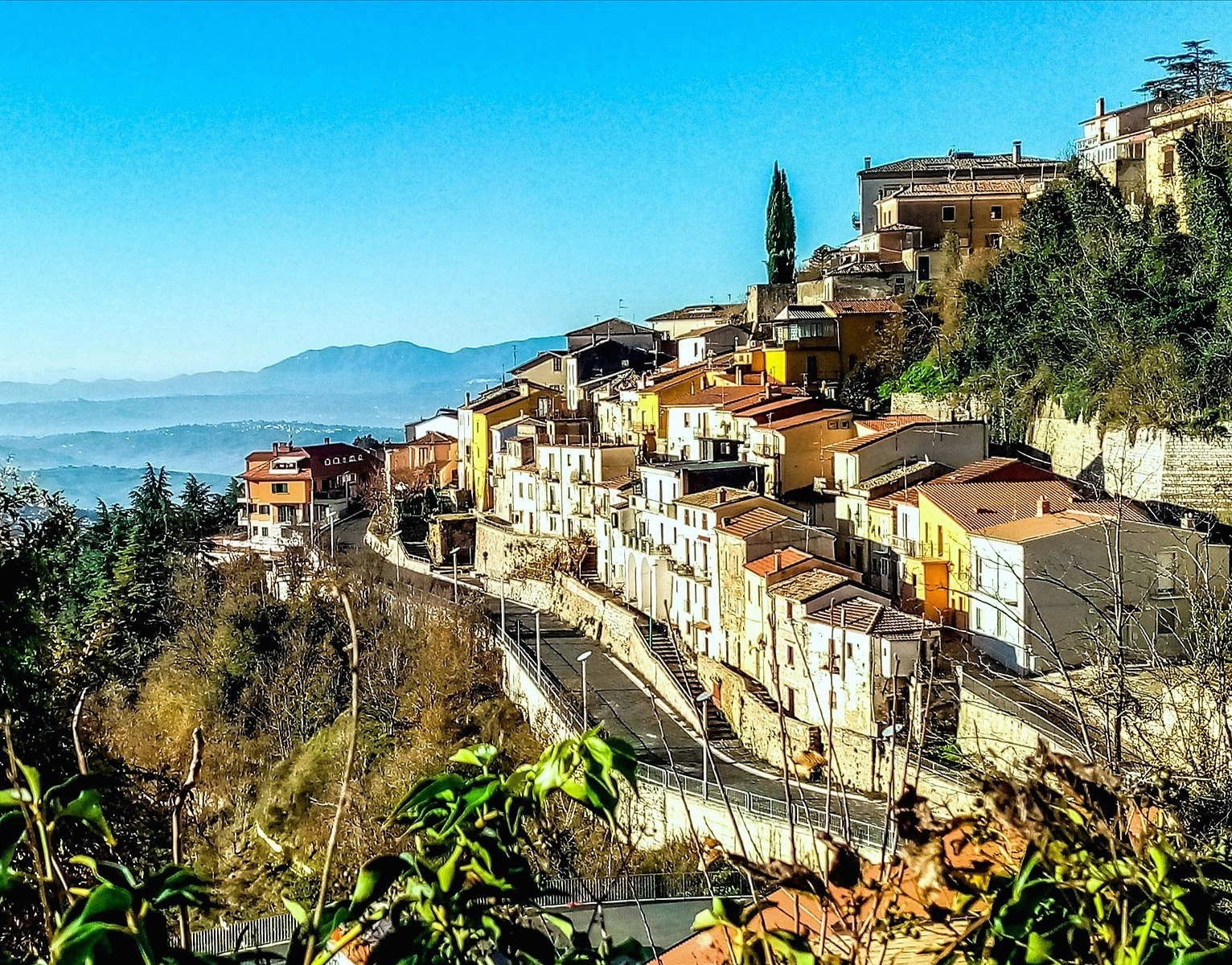
The Sambuco district (Saùco in dialect), full of caves populated since the time of the Normans or the Angevins by a small Franco-Provençal community, whose Gallo-Romance linguistic traits were still recognizable in the nineteenth-century local vernacular

Radically different, despite the continuous and frequent interchanges, are instead the idioms used by the communities belonging to the territorial linguistic minorities, such as the Albanians of Greci (once also present in Ariano), the Franco-Provençal of Valmaggiore (also infiltrated as far as the city of Ariano, where conspicuous traces of their presence remain) as well as the ancient Schiavoni (also present in Ariano and surroundings); the latter, unlike the related Molise Croats, have lost their linguistic individuality after however having had a decisive influence on the history and culture of Ginestra degli Schiavoni, Sant'Arcangelo Trimonte (formerly known as Montemale or Montemalo) and Villanova del Battista (the ancient Polcarino degli Schiavoni), three communities linked since the very beginning to the diocese of Ariano (although since 1997 the parish of Sant'Arcangelo Trimonte has been transferred to the archdiocese of Benevento in exchange for Savignano Irpino and the already cited Greeks).

Moreover, some vernacular differences, albeit small, are even felt between one area and another of the same municipality: thus, for example, the word "dietro" (behind) is translated into dialect as addréto in some sectors of the Arianese territory, while arréto in others (from note, however, how both forms present the typical closed tonic); such a variety of nuances is attributable to the wide diffusion of rural settlements scattered over a very vast (the largest in Campania) and somewhat impervious countryside. Added to this is a certain sociolinguistic differentiation between a "cultured" and a "peasant" vernacular, the latter characterized by more altered but at the same time more colorful forms and cadences, with a greater propensity for rhotacism and betacism (for example, "due o tre volte" (two or three times) will be pronounced "doj-tre vvote" in the "cultured" variant, but "roj-tre bbote" in the "peasant" one). Not infrequently the subtle vernacular differences between the various localities of the countryside, as well as between the different social classes, have offered easy starting points for local political satire.

Italian:

Tutti abbracciano il contadino:
"Tu sei il miglior compare mio;
Ti darò la libertà,
ma porta sempre roba qua"

Arianese:

Tutti abbràzzano lu cafone:
"Tu si lu meglio cumparone;
T'aggia rà la libertà,
ma porta sàrcine sempe qua"

English:

Everyone hugs the farmer:
"You are my best friend;
I will give you freedom,
but always bring stuff here"

— Nicola Di Gruttola, February 1946.
