= Southern Italian =

Southern Italian may refer to:

- Anything of or from Southern Italy
- The Neapolitan language (sometimes called Continental Southern Italian), a language group native to Southern Italy
- Extreme Southern Italian, a language group native to Southern Italy
- Southern Italian Koiné, a koiné language native to Southern Italy

== See also ==
- South Italy, a statistical region
- Southern Italy (European Parliament constituency)
