= Florentine dialect =

Dialect of Tuscan spoken in Florence

Florentine
- dialetto fiorentino
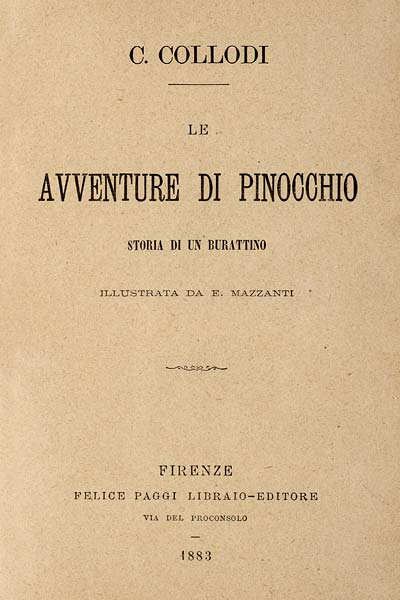
- The title page of Pinocchio (1883), by Carlo Collodi. Collodi included several Florentinisms in his book.
- Native to: Italy
- Region: Tuscany (Florence)
- Language family: Indo-European: Italic; Latino-Faliscan; Latin; Romance; Italo-Western; Italo-Dalmatian; Italo-Romance; Tuscan; Northern; Florentine
- Dialects: Judeo-Florentine

Language codes
- ISO 639-3: –
- Glottolog: fior1235
- IETF: it-u-sd-itfi

The Florentine dialect or vernacular (dialetto fiorentino or vernacolo fiorentino) is a variety of Tuscan, a Romance language spoken in the Italian city of Florence and its immediate surroundings.

A variant derived from it historically, once called la pronuncia fiorentina emendata (literally, 'the amended Florentine pronunciation'), was the official national language of the Kingdom of Italy when it was established in 1861. It is the most widely spoken of the Tuscan dialects.

== Literature ==
Important writers such as Dante Alighieri, Francis Petrarch, Giovanni Boccaccio and, later, Niccolò Machiavelli and Francesco Guicciardini wrote in literary Tuscan/Florentine, including Dante's Divine Comedy.

It became a second prestige language alongside Latin and was used as such for centuries.

== Differences from Standard Italian ==
Florentine, and Tuscan more generally, can be distinguished from Standard Italian by differences in numerous features at all levels: phonology, morphology, syntax and lexicon.

Perhaps the difference most noticed by Italians and foreigners alike is known as the gorgia toscana (literally 'Tuscan throat'), a consonant-weakening rule widespread in Tuscany in which the voiceless plosive phonemes /k/, /t/, /p/ are pronounced between vowels as fricatives [h], [θ], [ɸ] respectively. The sequence /la kasa/ la casa 'the house', for example, is pronounced [la ˈhaːsa], and /buko/ buco 'hole' is realized as [ˈbuːho]. Preceded by a pause or a consonant, /k/ is produced as [k] (as in the word casa alone or in the phrase in casa). Similar alternations obtain for /t/ → [t], [θ] and /p/ → [p], [ɸ].

Strengthening to a geminate consonant occurs when the preceding word triggers syntactic doubling (raddoppiamento fonosintattico) so the initial consonant /p/ of pipa 'pipe (for smoking)' has three phonetic forms: [p] in [ˈpiːɸa] spoken as a single word or following a consonant, [ɸ] if preceded by a vowel as in [la ɸiːɸa] la pipa 'the pipe' and [pp] (also transcribed [pː]) in [tre pˈpiːɸe] tre pipe 'three pipes'.

Parallel alternations of the affricates /tʃ/ and /dʒ/ are also typical of Florentine but by no means confined to it or even to Tuscan. The word gelato is pronounced with [dʒ] following a pause or a consonant, [ʒ] following a vowel and [ddʒ] if raddoppiamento applies ([dʒeˈlaːθo], [un dʒeˈlaːθo] un gelato, [ˈkwattro ʒeˈlaːθi] quattro gelati, [ˈtre ddʒeˈlaːθi] tre gelati. Similarly, the initial consonant of /ˈtʃena/ cena 'dinner' has three phonetic forms, [tʃ], [ʃ] and [ttʃ]. In both cases, the weakest variant appears between vowels ([reˈʒoːne] regione 'region', [ˈkwattro ʒeˈlaːθi] quattro gelati; [la ˈʃeːna] la cena, [ˈbaːʃo] bacio 'kiss'; this one actually comes from Latin basium and was never pronounced with an affricate, even though the modern standardized pronunciation, that was solely based on the spelling, amalgamated the fricative with the affricates, hence putting an unetymological /t/ in pronunciation).

Florentine	Italian	English
io sòn	io sono	I am
te tu sei	tu sei	you are
egli gl'è	egli è	he/she/it is
noi s'è/semo¹	noi siamo	we are
voi vù siete	voi siete	you are
essi gl'enno	essi sono	they are
io c'ho	io ho	I have
te tu c'hai	tu hai	you have
egli c'ha	egli ha	he/she/it has
noi ci s'ha	noi abbiamo	we have
voi vù c'avete	voi avete	you have
essi gl'hanno	loro hanno	they have

¹Notice that the form semo directly comes from Vulgar Latin *(es)sēmus, a form shared throughout most languages of Italy together with som~son, from the original Latin sumus (cf. Spanish somos). Despite this, cultured Florentine displaced all the original 1st person plural present forms with the subjunctive of the 3rd conjugation (-ire verbs, which have the subjunctive in -iamo), so that andamo, cademo, sentimo have all changed to andiamo, cadiamo, sentiamo.

=== Cases ===
Florentine uses the diminutive case -ino/-ine far more than Italian does, with many surnames also ending in -ini.

Italian	Florentine	English
belle	belline	lovely
povere	poverine/poerine	poor
poche	pochine/pohine	little

=== Article and pronouns ===
Florentine often abbreviates its articles and pronouns.

Italian	Florentine
il tuo	i’ tu

=== Unique phrases ===
The Florentine dialect has several unique phrases as compared the other Tuscan dialects.

Florentine	English
maremma	damnit
trombaio	plumber
icchè tu sei grullo?	are you stupid?
smettila, se no tu ne buschi	stop it, or I will beat you (lit. "you will get them", i.e., beatings)
acquaio	kitchen sink
sei un boccalone	you have a big mouth
babbo	dad/father

== Judeo-Florentine ==
A variety of Florentine known as Judeo-Florentine was spoken by the Jewish community of Florence. It was used in the 19th-century play titled La Gnora Luna, and is now no longer used by Florentine Jews.
