= Istriot =

Romance language spoken in Croatia

- Eîstrioto, Lèngua Eîstriota; Bumbar, Valìʃe, Ruvignìʃ, Faʃanìʃ, Siʃanìʃ, Galiʃaneʃ
- Native to: Croatia
- Region: Istria
- Native speakers: 400 (2007); L2 speakers: 900 (2007)
- Language family: Indo-European: Italic; Latino-Faliscan; Latin; Romance; Italo-Western; Italo-Dalmatian; Dalmatian Romance?; Istriot

Language codes
- ISO 639-3: ist
- Glottolog: istr1244
- ELP: Istriot
- Linguasphere: 51-AAA-na
- Istriot is classified as Severely Endangered by the UNESCO Atlas of the World's Languages in Danger

The Istriot language (Lèngua Eîstriota) is a Romance language of the Italo-Dalmatian branch spoken by about 400 people in the southwestern part of the Istrian peninsula in Croatia, particularly in Rovinj and Vodnjan.

== Classification ==
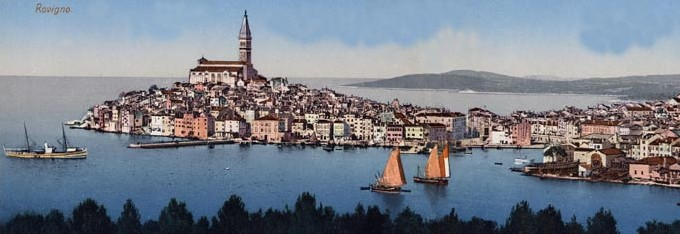
Rovinj (Rovigno), the historical capital of the Istriots

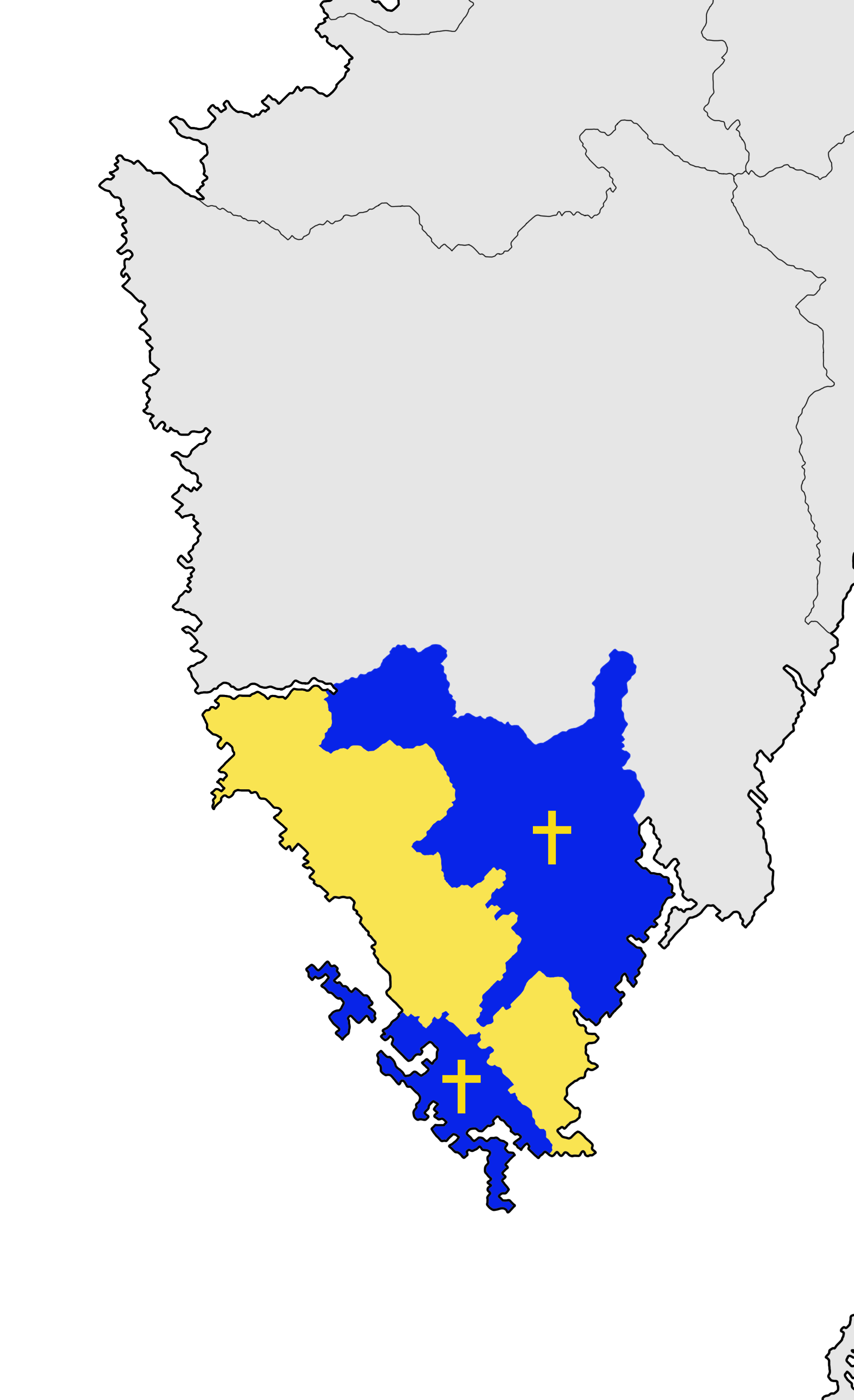
Areas in Istria where the Istriot language coexisted with other dialects (Chakavian and Istrovenetian) after 1900
Areas where the Istriot language had already vanished by 1900

Istriot is a Romance language currently only found in Istria. Its classification has remained mostly unclear; it has been variously regarded:

- as being related to the Ladin populations of the Alps. According to the Italian linguist Matteo Bartoli, the Ladin area used to extend – until the year 1000 AD – from southern Istria to Friuli and eastern Switzerland. A similar hypothesis was also proposed by the Istriot linguist Antonio Ive.
- as an independent Northern Italian language, belonging neither to the Venetian language nor to the Gallo-Italic group (opinion shared by linguists Tullio De Mauro and Maurizio Dardano);
- as an independent language of the Italo-Dalmatian group
- as an autochthonous Romance language heavily influenced by Venetian, Friulian and Slavic superstrates by Mirko Deanović
- In 2017 it was classified by the Max Planck Institute for the Science of Human History with the Dalmatian language in the Dalmatian Romance subgroup,

When Istria was a region of the Kingdom of Italy, Istriot was considered by the authorities as a subdialect of Venetian.

Historically, its speakers never referred to it as "Istriot"; it had six names, after the six towns where it was spoken. In Vodnjan it was named "Bumbaro", in Bale "Valìʃe", in Rovinj "Ruvignìʃ", in Šišan "Siʃanìʃ", in Fažana "Faʃanìʃ" and in Galižana "Galiʃaneʃ". The term Istriot was coined by the 19th-century Italian linguist Graziadio Isaia Ascoli.

This language is still spoken by some people in the Istriot communities in Fertilia and Maristella, in Sardinia.

There are about 400 speakers left, making it a severely endangered language.

== Vocabulary ==
Below is a comparison of Istriot with several closely related Romance languages and Latin:

Latin	Italian	Istriot (Rovignìʃ)	Venetian	Bisiacco Venetian	English
clave(m)	chiave	ciàve	ciave	ciave	key
nocte(m)	notte	nuòto	note/not	note	night
cantare	cantare	cantà	caŋtar	caŋtar	to sing
capra(m)	capra	càpra, càvara	càvara	cavra	goat
lingua(m)	lingua	lèngua	lengua	lengua	language
platea(m)	piazza	piàsa	pia-sa	pia-sa	square
ponte(m)	ponte	pònto	poŋte/poŋt	poŋt	bridge
ecclesia(m)	chiesa	cièʃa	cexa	cesa	church
hospitale(m)	ospedale	uspadàl	ospedal	ospedal	hospital
caseu(m) lat.vulg.formaticu(m)	formaggio/cacio	furmàio	formajo	formai	cheese

== Phonology ==
The phonology of the Istriot language:

=== Consonants ===
		Labial	Dental/ Alveolar	Post-alv./ Palatal	Velar
Nasal		m	n	ɲ	(ŋ)
Stop	voiceless	p	t	t͡ʃ	k
Stop	voiced	b	d	d͡ʒ	ɡ
Fricative	voiceless	f	s		
Fricative	voiced	v	z		
Trill			r		
Approximant	central			j	w
Approximant	lateral		l	(ʎ)	

- Sounds /j, w/ can also be noted as [i̯ u̯] among different dialects.
- [ŋ] occurs as a result of a nasal consonant preceding a velar stop.
- [ʎ] can occur as a result of Italian loanwords.

=== Vowels ===
	Front	Central	Back
Close	i		u
Close-mid	e		o
Open-mid	ɛ		ɔ
Open		a	

== Orthography ==
The Istriot alphabet is the following:

Letter	Pronunciation (IPA)	Notes
A, a	/a/	à
B, b	/b/	–
C, c	/k/, /tʃ/	/k/ when followed by "a", "o", "u" or a consonant; /tʃ/ when followed by "e" or "i"
Ch, ch	/k/	When followed by "e" or "i"
Ci, ci	/tʃ/	When followed by "a", "o", "u"
D, d	/d/	–
Dz, dz	/dz/	–
E, e	/ɛ/, /e/	è, é
F, f	/f/	–
G, g	/ɡ/, /dʒ/	/ɡ/ before "a", "o", "u" or a consonant, /dʒ/ before "e" and "i"
Gh, gh	/ɡ/	When followed by "e" or "i"
Gi, gi	/dʒ/	When followed by "a", "o", "u"
H, h	–	Used in [ch] and [gh]
I, i	/i/, /j/	í, î
J, j	/j/	–
L, l	/l/	–
M, m	/m/	–
N, n	/n/	–
Nj, nj / Gn, gn	/ɲ/	
O, o	/ɔ/, /o/	ò, ó
P, p	/p/	–
R, r	/r/	–
S, s	/s/	–
T, t	/t/	–
Ts, ts	/ts/	–
U, u	/u/, /w/	ú, û
V, v	/v/	–
Z, z	/z/	–

== Example ==
This is a poem called "Grièbani" by Ligio Zanini in the dialect of Rovinj-Rovigno.

Istriot

La nostra zì oûna longa cal da griebani:

i spironi da Monto inda uò salvà,
e 'l brasso da Vistro uò rastà scuio
pei grutoni pioûn alti del mar,
ca ruzaghia sta tiera viecia-stara.
Da senpro i signemo pissi sensa nom,
ca da sui sa prucoûra 'l bucon
par guodi la veîta leîbara del cucal,
pastadi dala piova da Punente a da Livante
e cume i uleîi mai incalmadi.
Fra ste carme zì stà la nostra salvissa,
cume i riboni a sa salva dal dulfeîn
fra i scagni del sico da San Damian;
el nostro pan, nato gra li gruote, zi stà inbinideî
cul sudur sula iera zbruventa da Paloû...
e i vemo caminà par oûna longa cal da griebani,
c'ancui la riesta lissada dali nostre urme.

Italian

La nostra è una lunga strada irta di sassi:

gli speroni di Monto ci hanno salvato,
ed il braccio di Vistro è rimasto scoglio
per le grotte poste più in alto del mare,
che erode questa antica terra.
Da sempre siamo pesciolini
che da soli si procurano il boccone
per godere la libera vita del gabbiano,
oppressi dalla pioggia di Ponente e di Levante
come olivi senza innesti.
Fra queste insenature è stata la nostra salvezza,
come i pagelli si salvano dal delfino
fra le tane della secca di San Damiano;
il nostro pane, nato tra le grotte, è stato benedetto
col sudore nell'aia ribollente di Palù...
ed abbiamo camminato per una lunga strada dissestata,
che oggi rimane spianate dai nostri passi.

== See also ==
- Istrian Italians
- Julian March
- Dalmatian language
- Wikisource:Istriot
