= Cilentan dialect =

Neapolitan dialect of Salerno, Italy

Cilentan
- Celendano
- Native to: Italy
- Region: Cilento (Southern Campania)
- Language family: Indo-European: Italic; Latino-Faliscan; Latinic; Romance; Italo-Western; Italo-Dalmatian; Italo-Romance; Intermediate and Extreme Southern Italian; Cilentan

Language codes
- ISO 639-3: –
- Glottolog: None

The Cilentan dialect (endonym: celendano or cilindanu; Italian: cilentano), also known as Cilento dialect, is a Neapolitan dialect spoken in the area of Cilento, located in the southern part of the Province of Salerno, Campania, Italy.

== Influences ==
It has been influenced, especially in the Vallo di Diano and in central Cilento, by the Basilicata language as spoken in Potenza and part of its Province of Potenza. In the towns of northern Cilento close to the urban area of Salerno (for example Agropoli, Capaccio and Paestum), the language is mainly influenced by Neapolitan, more specifically by the Salernitan dialect. In the southern corner of Cilento, the language is largely influenced by Extreme Southern Italian, particularly the Central–Southern Calabrian dialects.

== Phonology ==
=== Consonants ===
Many words in Cilento are similar to their Neapolitan counterparts, but with slightly different consonants.

- LL: The "ll" in certain Neapolitan words becomes an "dd" in Cilento, e.g. gallenèlla (Italian: gallinella, English: hen) becomes gaddenèdda.
- NF: The "nf" in certain Neapolitan words becomes an "mp" in Cilento, e.g. nfame (Italian: infame, English: infamous) becomes mpame.

== See also ==
- Lucania
- Cilento
- Vallo di Diano
- Cilentan Coast
- Cilento National Park
- Province of Salerno
- Irpinian dialect
