= Tuscan dialects =

Italo-Dalmatian varieties of Romance

Tuscan
- toscano, vernacolo
- Native to: Italy
- Region: Tuscany (except parts of the Province of Massa-Carrara); Umbria (western border with Tuscany); Corsica (as a variety); Sardinia, Gallura (as a variety), Sassari (as a variety)
- Language family: Indo-European: Italic; Latino-Faliscan; Latin; Romance; Italo-Western; Italo-Dalmatian; Italo-Romance; Tuscan
- Dialects: Florentine Corsican Bagitto †

Language codes
- ISO 639-3: –
- Linguist List: ita-tus
- Glottolog: None
- Linguasphere: 51-AAA-qa
- IETF: it-u-sd-it52
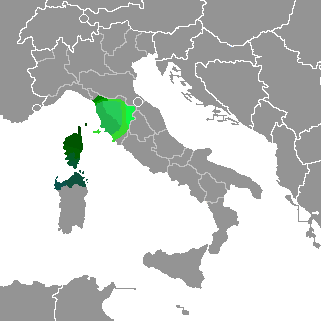

Tuscan (Italian: toscano [tosˈkaːno]; locally: vernacolo) is a set of Italo-Dalmatian varieties of Romance languages spoken in Tuscany, Corsica, and Sardinia.

Tuscan, especially its Florentine variety, formed the basis for establishing Standard Italian. Due mostly to the prestige of the works by Dante Alighieri, Petrarch, Giovanni Boccaccio, Niccolò Machiavelli, and Francesco Guicciardini, the Tuscan-derived elaboration became the primary language of culture throughout Italy, and later the official language of all of the historic Italian states and then of the Kingdom of Italy when it was formed.

== Subdialects ==
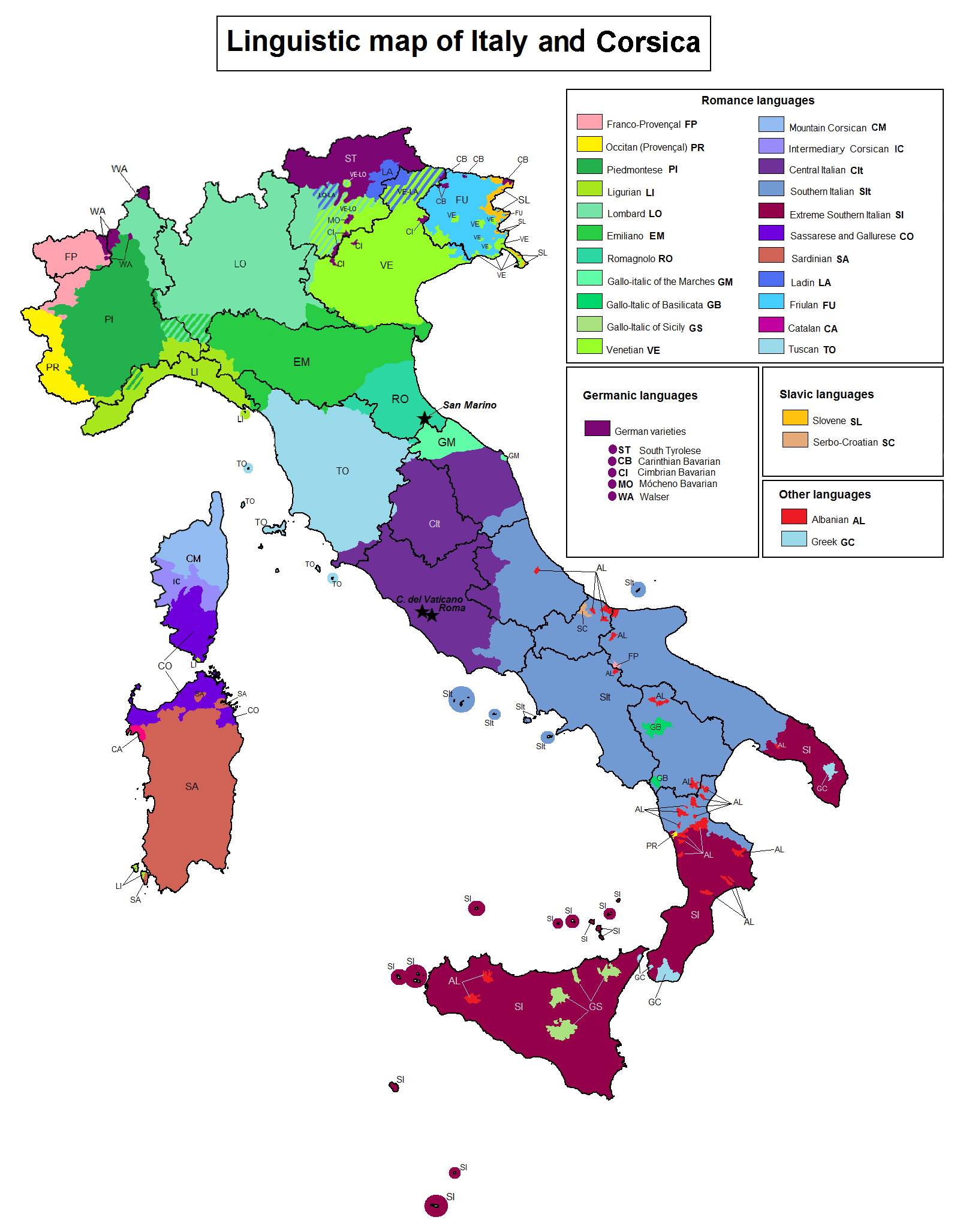
Dialects and languages of Italy by groups (Tuscan group in light shades of azure and violet)

In De vulgari eloquentia (c. 1300), Dante Alighieri distinguishes four main variants of the Tuscan language: fiorentino (Florence), senese (Siena), lucchese (Lucca), and aretino (Arezzo).

Tuscan is a language complex composed of many local variants, with minor differences among them.

The main subdivisions are between Northern Tuscan dialects, the Southern Tuscan dialects, and Corsican.

The Northern Tuscan dialects are (from east to west):

- Florentine (fiorentino), the main dialect of Florence, Chianti, and the Mugello; also spoken in Prato and along the river Arno as far as the city of Fucecchio.
- Pistoiese, spoken in the city of Pistoia and the nearest zones (some linguists include this dialect in Florentine).
- Pesciatino or Valdinievolese, spoken in the Valdinievole zone, in the cities of Pescia and Montecatini Terme (some linguists include this dialect in Lucchese).
- Lucchese, spoken in Lucca and the nearby hills (Lucchesia).
- Versiliese, spoken in the historical area of Versilia.
- Viareggino, spoken in Viareggio and vicinity.
- Pisano-Livornese, spoken in Pisa, Livorno and vicinity, along the coast from Livorno to Cecina.

The Southern Tuscan dialects are (from east to west):

- Aretino-Chianaiolo, spoken in Arezzo and the Valdichiana.
- Casentinese, spoken in Casentino from Stia to Subbiano in the Arezzo province.
- Senese, spoken in the city and province of Siena.
- Grossetano, spoken in Grosseto and along the southern coast.
- Elbano, spoken on the island of Elba.

Alto Valdelsano, spoken in the municipalities of Colle di Val d'Elsa, Casole d'Elsa, San Gimignano, Poggibonsi, and Certaldo, acts as a watershed between the Florentine and Senese dialects.

Corsican, on the island of Corsica, and the Corso-Sardinian transitional varieties that are spoken in northern Sardinia (Gallurese and Sassarese) are classified by scholars as a direct offshoot from medieval Tuscan, even though they now constitute a distinct linguistic group.

== Speakers ==
Excluding the inhabitants of Province of Massa and Carrara, who speak an Emilian dialect, and people in the area of Tuscan Romagna, who speak Romagnol, around 3.5 million people speak Tuscan.

== Dialectal features ==
Tuscan as a whole has certain defining features, with subvarieties that are distinguished by minor details. A Romance language variety descending from Vulgar Latin, it also contains a substrate from the Etruscan language of the original inhabitants prior to Romanization. The Etruscan influence is found most saliently in the toponyms of Tuscany, as well as some parts of neighbouring Umbria and Lazio.

=== Phonology ===
==== Tuscan gorgia ====
The Tuscan gorgia affects the voiceless stop consonants /k/, /t/, and /p/. They are usually pronounced as fricatives in post-vocalic position when not blocked by the competing phenomenon of syntactic gemination:

- /k/ → [h]
- /t/ → [θ]
- /p/ → [ɸ]

==== Weakening of G and C ====
A similar phonological alternation is the intervocalic weakening of the Italian "soft" g, the voiced affricate /dʒ/ (g as in judge) and "soft" c, the voiceless affricate /tʃ/ (ch as in church), known as attenuation, or, more commonly, as deaffrication.

Between vowels, the voiced postalveolar affricate consonant is realized as voiced postalveolar fricative (s and z in the English measure and azure):

/dʒ/ → [ʒ].

This phenomenon is very evident in daily speech (common also in Umbria and elsewhere in Central Italy): the phrase la gente 'the people' in Standard Italian is pronounced [la ˈdʒɛnte], but in Tuscan, it is [la ˈʒɛnte].

Similarly, the voiceless postalveolar affricate is pronounced as a voiceless postalveolar fricative between two vowels:

/tʃ/ → [ʃ].

The sequence /la ˈtʃena/ la cena, 'the dinner', in Standard Italian is pronounced [la ˈtʃeːna], but in Tuscan, it is [la ˈʃeːna]. As a result of the weakening rule, there are a few minimal pairs distinguished only by length of the voiceless fricative (e.g. [laʃeˈrɔ] lacerò 'it/he/she ripped' vs. [laʃʃeˈrɔ] lascerò 'I will leave/let').

==== Affrication of S ====
A less common phonetic phenomenon is the realization of "voiceless s" (voiceless alveolar fricative /s/) as the voiceless alveolar affricate [ts] when preceded by /r/, /l/, or /n/.

/s/ → [ts].

For example, il sole (the sun), pronounced in Standard Italian as [il ˈsoːle], would be in theory pronounced [il ˈtsoːle] in Tuscan. However, since assimilation of the final consonant of the article to the following consonant tends to occur in exactly such cases (see Masculine definite articles), the actual pronunciation is usually [is ˈsoːle]. Affrication of /s/ can more commonly be heard word-internally, as in falso (false) /ˈfalso/ → [ˈfaltso]. It is a common phenomenon in Central Italy but is not exclusive to that area; for example, it also occurs in Switzerland (Canton Ticino). It does not occur in a small area including Florence (except Rifredi) and Prato.

==== No diphthongization of /ɔ/ ====
There are two Tuscan historical outcomes of Latin ŏ in stressed open syllables. Passing first through a stage /ɔ/, the vowel has then developed as a diphthong [wɔ]. The phenomenon has never gained universal acceptance, however, and so forms with the diphthong have come to be accepted as Standard Italian (e.g. fuoco, buono, nuovo, duomo), but the monophthong remains in popular speech (foco, bono, novo, domo).

=== Morphology ===
==== Accusative "te" for "tu" ====
A characteristic of Tuscan is the use of the accusative pronoun te in emphatic clauses of the type "You! What are you doing here?".

- Standard Italian: tu lo farai, no? 'You'll do it, won't you?'
- Tuscan: Te lo farai, no?
- Standard Italian: tu, vieni qua! 'You, come here!'
- Tuscan: Te, vieni qua!

==== Double dative pronoun ====
A morphological phenomenon, cited also by Alessandro Manzoni in his novel I promessi sposi (The Betrothed), is the doubling of the dative pronoun.

For the use of a personal pronoun as indirect object (to someone, to something), also called dative case, Standard Italian makes use of a construction preposition + pronoun a me (to me), or it makes use of a synthetic pronoun form, mi (to me). Tuscan frequently makes use of both in the same utterance as a kind of intensification of the dative/indirect object:

- In Standard Italian: a me piace or mi piace ("I like it"; literally, "it pleases me")
- In Tuscan: a me mi piace or a me mi garba ("I like it")

This usage is widespread throughout the central regions of Italy, not only in Tuscany, and is often considered redundant and erroneous by language purists. It is also a standard feature in Spanish: a mí me gusta ("I like it")

In some dialects, the double accusative pronoun me mi vedi (lit: Me you see me) can be heard, but that is considered to be an archaic form.

==== Masculine definite articles ====
Both the singular and the plural masculine definite articles can be realized phonetically as [i] in Florentine varieties of Tuscan but are distinguished by their phonological effect on following consonants. The singular causes the lengthening of the following consonant: [i kkaːne] 'the dog'. However, the plural permits consonant weakening: [i haːni] 'the dogs'. As in Italian, the masculine singular lo occurs before consonants long by nature or not permitting /l/ in clusters (lo zio 'the uncle', lo studente 'the student'), but forms such as i zio can be heard in rustic varieties.

==== Noi + impersonal si ====
A morpholosyntactic phenomenon that is found throughout Tuscany is the personal use of the particle identical to impersonal si (not to be confused with passive si or the reflexive si), as the first-person plural. That is basically the same as the use of on in French.

It is possible to use the construction si + third-person in singular verb, which can be preceded by the first-plural person pronoun noi.

- Standard Italian: Andiamo a mangiare (We're going to eat), Noi andiamo là (We go there)
- Tuscan: Si va a mangià (We're going to eat), Noi si va là (We go there)

The phenomenon is found in all verb tenses, including compound tenses. In those tenses, the use of si requires a form of essere (to be) as auxiliary verb. If the verb is one that otherwise selects auxiliary avere in compound constructions, the past participle does not agree with the subject in gender and number:

- Italian: Abbiamo mangiato al ristorante.
- Tuscan: S'è mangiato al ristorante.

If the verb normally requires essere, the past participle is marked as plural:

- Italian: Siamo andati al cinema.
- Tuscan: S'è andati al cinema.

Usually, si contracts before è: si è → s'è.

==== Fo (faccio) and vo (vado) ====
Another morphological phenomenon present in Tuscan is what might appear to be shortening of first singular verb forms in the present tense of fare (to do, to make) and andare (to go).

- Fare: It. faccio Tusc. fo (I do, I make)
- Andare: It. vado Tusc. vo (I go)

These forms have two origins. Natural phonological change alone can account for loss of /d/ and reduction of /ao/ to /o/ in the case of /vado/ > */vao/ > /vo/. A case such as Latin sapio > Italian so (I know), however, admits no such phonological account since the expected outcome of /sapio/ would be */sappjo/, with a normal lengthening of the consonant preceding /j/.

What seems to have taken place is a realignment of the paradigm in accordance with the statistically minor but highly-frequent paradigms of dare (give) and stare (be, stay). Thus, so, sai, sa, sanno (all singulars and the third-person plural of 'know') have come to fit the template of do, dai, dà, danno ('give'), sto, stai, sta, stanno ('be, stay'), and fo, fai, fa, fanno ('make, do'), which have followed the same pattern. The form vo, while quite possibly a natural phonological development, seems to have been reinforced by analogy in that case.

==== Loss of infinitival "-re" ====
A phonological phenomenon that might appear to be morphological is the loss of the infinitival ending -re of verbs.

- andàre → andà
- pèrdere → pèrde
- finìre → finì

Stress remains on the same vowel that is stressed in the full form and so the infinitive may coincide with various conjugated singulars: pèrde 'to lose', pèrde 's/he loses'; finì 'to finish', finì 's/he finished'. This homophony seldom, if ever, causes confusion, as they usually appear in distinct syntactic contexts.

The infinitive without -re is universal in some subtypes such as Pisano-Livornese, but in the vicinity of Florence, alternations are regular and so the full infinitive (e.g. vedere 'to see') appears before a pause, and the clipped form (vedé) is found otherwise. The consonant of an enclitic is lengthened if it is preceded by stressed vowel (vedéllo 'to see it', portàcci 'to bring us') but not when the preceding vowel of the infinitive is unstressed (lèggelo 'to read it', pèrdeti 'to lose you').

A similar process is found in Romanian, with infinitives cited as a ("to") + the verb, and the -re has been dropped. As in Tuscan, the stress is on the same syllable that had it before the loss of -re.

In Catalan and its dialects, in Campidanese Sardinian and for some Portuguese-speakers, final infinitive -r is not pronounced and so anar is pronounced /ə'na/.

A phenomenon similar in origin in French has led to loss of both /r/ and final /e/ in the -are class of infinitives at an early stage and so the final syllable of Modern French aimer, chanter etc. is pronounced as stressed [e].

=== Lexicon ===
The most important differences among dialects is in the lexicon, which also distinguishes the different subdialects. The Tuscan lexicon is almost entirely shared with Standard Italian, but many words may be perceived as obsolete or literary by non-Tuscans. There are also many strictly-regional words and expressions.

Characteristically-Tuscan words:

- accomodare (which means "to arrange" in Standard Italian) for riparare (to repair)
- babbo for papà (dad), also in Umbria, Marche
- billo for tacchino (turkey), found also in Umbria and Lazio
- bove (literary form in Standard Italian) for bue (ox), also in Umbria
- cacio for formaggio (cheese), especially for Pecorino
- calzoni (literary form in Standard Italian) for pantaloni (trousers)
- camiciola for canottiera (undervest)
- cannella (literary form in Standard Italian) for rubinetto (tap), widespread in Central and Southern Italy
- capo (literary form in Standard Italian) and chiorba for testa (head)
- cencio for straccio (rag, tatters) (but also straccio is widely used in Tuscany)
- chetarsi (literary form in Standard Italian) or chetassi for fare silenzio (to be silent)
- codesto (literary form in Standard Italian) is a pronoun which specifically identifies an object far from the speaker but near the listener (corresponding in meaning to Latin iste).
- costì or costà is a locative adverb that refers to a place far from the speaker but near the listener. It relates to codesto as qui/qua relates to questo and lì/là to quello
- desinare (literary form in Standard Italian) for pranzare (to have lunch)
- diaccio for ghiacciato, freddo (frozen, cold)
- essi for sii (second-person singular imperative form of 'to be')
- furia (which means "fury" in Standard Italian) for fretta (hurry)
- golpe or gorpe for volpe (fox), also in Umbria, Marche, but also found in Anonimo Romano's Cronica (written in Romanesco Vulgar Latin)
- garbare for piacere (to like) (but also piacere is sometimes used in Tuscany)
- gota (literary form in Standard Italian) for guancia (cheek)
- ire for andare (to go) (only some forms as ito (gone), not unique to Tuscany)
- lapis for matita (pencil), common throughout Italy
- popone for melone (cantaloupe)
- punto for per nulla or niente affatto (not at all) in negative sentences (cf. French ne ... point)
- rigovernare for lavare i piatti (to do/wash the dishes)
- sciocco (which means "silly" or "stupid" in Standard Italian) for insipido (insipid)
- sistola for tubo da giardinaggio (garden hose)
- sortire for uscire (to exit) (compare French sortir)
- sudicio for spazzatura (garbage) as a noun and for sporco (dirty) as an adjective
- termosifone or radiatore for calorifero (radiator)
- tocco for le 13 (one p.m.), lunch time

== See also ==
- Augusto Novelli, Italian playwright known for using Tuscan for 20th-century Florentine theater
- The Adventures of Pinocchio, written by Carlo Collodi in Italian, employing frequent Florentinisms
- Paleo-Corsican language
- Etruscan language
