= Benevento dialect =

Dialect of Neapolitan

Beneventan
- Beneventano
- Region: Province of Benevento
- Language family: Indo-European: Italic; Latino-Faliscan; Latinic; Romance; Italo-Western; Italo-Dalmatian; Italo-Romance; Intermediate Southern Italian; Campano; Beneventan

Language codes
- ISO 639-3: –
- IETF: nap-u-sd-itbn

The Benevento dialect, or Beneventano, is the variety of the Neapolitan language which is found in and around the city of Benevento and its wider province, inside the region of Campania in Italy.
