= Italo-Dalmatian languages =

Romance subfamily of centro-southern Italy and Corsica

Italo-Dalmatian
- Central Romance
- Geographic distribution: Italy; France; Croatia
- Ethnicity: Italians; Corsicans
- Linguistic classification: Indo-European: Italic; Latino-Faliscan; Latin; Romance; Italo-Western; Italo-Dalmatian
- Subdivisions: Italo-Romance; Dalmatian Romance; Venetian?

Language codes
- Glottolog: ital1286

The Italo-Dalmatian languages, or Central Romance languages, are a group of Romance languages spoken in Italy, Corsica (France), and Croatia (Southwestern Istria and, formerly, Dalmatia).

Italo-Dalmatian can be split into:

- Italo-Romance, which includes most central and southern Italian languages.
- Dalmatian Romance, which includes Dalmatian and Istriot.

The generally accepted four branches of the Romance languages are Western Romance, Italo-Dalmatian, Sardinian and Eastern Romance. But there are other ways that the languages of Italo-Dalmatian can be classified in these branches:

- Italo-Dalmatian is sometimes included in Eastern Romance (which includes Romanian), leading to: Western, Sardinian, and Eastern branches.
- Italo-Dalmatian is sometimes included in Western Romance (which includes the Gallic and Iberian languages) as Italo-Western, leading to: Italo-Western, Sardinian, and Eastern branches.
- Italo-Romance is sometimes included in Italo-Western, with Dalmatian Romance included in Eastern Romance, leading to: Italo-Western, Sardinian, and Eastern branches.
- Corsican (from Italo-Dalmatian) and Sardinian are sometimes included together as Southern Romance, or Island Romance, leading to: Western, Italo-Dalmatian, Southern, and Eastern branches.

== Languages ==
Based on the criterion of mutual intelligibility, Dalby lists four languages: Italian (Tuscan), Corsican, Neapolitan–Sicilian–Central Italian, and Dalmatian.

=== Dalmatian Romance ===
- The Dalmatian language was spoken in the Dalmatia region of Croatia. It became extinct in the 19th century.
- The Istriot language is a language spoken in the southwestern part of Istrian peninsula in Croatia.

=== Venetian ===
The Venetian language is added to Italo-Dalmatian when excluded from Gallo-Italic, and then usually grouped with Istriot. However, Venetian is not grouped into the Italo-Dalmatian languages by Ethnologue, unlike Istriot. Glottolog v5.3 groups it into Dalmatian Romance. However, the major consensus among linguists is that in the dialectal landscape of northern Italy, Veneto dialects are clearly distinguished from Gallo-Italic dialects.

=== Italian ===
Italian is an official language in Italy, Switzerland, San Marino, Vatican City and western Istria (in Slovenia and Croatia). It used to have official status in Albania, Malta and Monaco, where it is still widely spoken, as well as in former Italian East Africa and Italian North Africa regions where it plays a significant role in various sectors. Italian is also spoken by large expatriate communities in the Americas and Australia. The Italian language was initially and primarily based on Florentine: it has been then deeply influenced by almost all regional languages of Italy while its received pronunciation (known as Pronuncia Fiorentina Emendata, Amended Florentine Pronunciation) is based on the accent of the Roman dialect; these are the reasons why Italian differs significantly from Tuscan and its Florentine variety.

=== Tuscan ===
- Tuscan: group of dialects spoken in the Italian region of Tuscany.
  - Northern Tuscan dialects:
    - Florentine is spoken in the city of Florence, and was the basis for Standard Italian.
    - Other dialects: Pistoiese; Pesciatino or Valdinievolese; Lucchese; Versiliese; Viareggino; Pisano-Livornese.
  - Southern Tuscan dialects:
    - Dialects of Aretino-Chianaiolo, Senese, Grossetano.

=== Corsican ===
- Corsican: group of dialects spoken in the French island of Corsica.
  - Corsican, spoken on Corsica, is thought to be descended from Medieval Tuscan. Tuscanization of the island's northern Corsican dialects in the past caused Corsican to be classified as Tuscan, but today this classification is more uncertain. Scholars have also noted continuity with Sardinian in the southern area of Corsica and assumed greater linguistic unity of the island prior to the Tuscan period, as well as identified concordances with southern Italian dialects and Central Italian dialects.
  - Gallurese and Sassarese, spoken on the northern tip of Sardinia, can be considered either dialects of Corsican or Corso-Sardinian transitional varieties.

=== Central Italian ===
Central Italian, or Latin–Umbrian–Marchegian and in Italian linguistics as "middle Italian dialects", is mainly spoken in the regions of: Lazio (which includes Rome); Umbria; central Marche; a small part of Abruzzo and Tuscany.

- Romanesco, spoken in Rome, Lazio. As mentioned above, it is the basis of the accent of the received pronunciation in standard Italian.
- Tuscia or Viterbo: spoken in the Province of Viterbo, Lazio.
- Central-Northern Lazian: spoken in the southern areas of the Metropolitan City of Rome Capital and the northern areas of the Provinces of Frosinone and Latina Lazio.
- Umbrian: spoken in Umbria.
- Central Marchigiano: spoken in central Marche.
- Sabino: spoken in the city of L'Aquila (Abruzzo) and the Province of Rieti (Lazio).

=== Intermediate Southern Italian ===
The "Intermediate Southern Italian group" is spoken in the southernmost portion of Marche, the southern part of Lazio, a great part of Abruzzo, a small portion of Calabria, and almost the entirety of Molise, Basilicata, Apulia and Campania (with the notable exceptions of the Lausberg area, southern Cilento and southern Salento).

- The Campanian dialects such as Neapolitan, Beneventano, Irpino, Arianese and Southern Laziale: spoken in most of Campania and the south of Lazio.
- The Abruzzese dialects such as Vastese: spoken in most of Abruzzo and the south of Marche.
- The Apulian dialects such as Barese and Tarantino: spoken in the majority of Apulia.
- The Molisan dialect: spoken in the region of Molise.
- The Basilicatine (Lucanian) dialect: spoken in Basilicata (historically also known as Lucania).
- The Cosentino dialect: spoken in the Province of Cosenza, north of Calabria, which (just like southern Cilentan and southern Salentino) strongly fades into the Extreme Southern Italian dialects that predominate to the south of it.

=== Extreme Southern Italian ===
The Extreme Southern Italian group of dialects is spoken all across the island of Sicily, in almost all the region of Calabria, and also in the very southern tips of both Campania and Apulia.

- Sicilian, spoken on the island of Sicily: Western Sicilian; Central Metafonetica; Southeast Metafonetica; Ennese; Eastern Nonmetafonetica; Messinese.
  - Sicilian dialects on other islands: Isole Eolie, on the Aeolian Islands; Pantesco, on the island of Pantelleria.
- Calabro, or Central-Southern Calabrian: dialects are spoken in the central and southern areas of the region of Calabria.
- Salentino, spoken in the Salento region of southern Apulia.
- Cilentan, spoken in the Cilento region of southern Campania.

== See also ==
- Languages of Italy
- Italian language
- Regional Italian
