= Neolanguage =

Neolanguage may refer to:

- Neolinguagem, a Portuguese term for gender-neutral neologisms in Portuguese
- Constructed language, languages developed by design, as opposed to occurring naturally
- Jargon, specialized terminology for a particular field
- Neologism, recently-coined or otherwise isolated terms
- Neo language, an international auxiliary language
- Newspeak, fictional language of the novel Nineteen Eighty-Four

== See also ==
- Neolinguistics
- Neurolinguistics
