= Dalmatian language =

Extinct Romance varieties of Dalmatia

Dalmatian
- Region: Dalmatia
- Extinct: 1898, with the death of Tuone Udaina (if he was the last speaker)
- Language family: Indo-European: Italic; Latino-Faliscan; Latin; Romance; Italo-Western; Italo-Dalmatian; Dalmatian Romance; Dalmatian

Language codes
- ISO 639-3: dlm
- Glottolog: dalm1243
- Linguasphere: 51-AAA-t
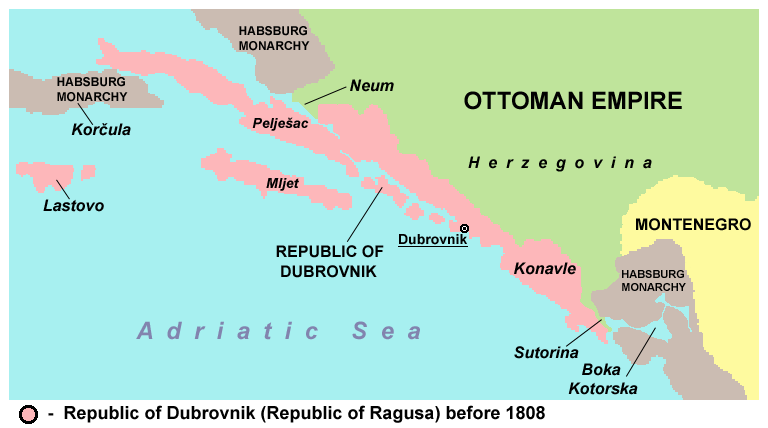

Dalmatian or Dalmatic (Dalmatian: dalmato, Italian: dalmatico, Croatian: dalmatski) is a group of now-extinct Romance language varieties that developed along the coast of Dalmatia, in the area of modern-day Croatia. Over the centuries they were increasingly influenced, and then supplanted, by Croatian and Venetian.

Today it is quite difficult to place Dalmatian within the Romance language landscape, where it somehow constitutes a branch of its own. In one of the most recent classifications, dating back to 2017, the Max Planck Institute for the Science of Human History places it, for example, together with Istriot in the Italo-Dalmatian Romance subgroup, with the most recent classification adding Venetian to this proposal. However, the classification of Dalmatian is not settled.

== Phonology ==
Consonants in Vegliote
	Labial		Alveolar/Dental		Palatal		Velar	
Plosive	p	b	t	d			k	ɡ
Nasal		m		n		ɲ		ŋ
Trill				r				
Fricative	f	v	s	z		j		
Lateral				l		ʎ		
Affricate			ts	dz	tʃ	dʒ		

== Varieties ==
=== Ragusan ===
This was spoken in Dubrovnik (Italian: Ragusa). Various Ragusan words are known from local documents in Latin and Venetian. One such document, for instance, records the words pen, teta, chesa, fachir and indicates the meanings 'bread', 'father', 'house', 'to do'. There are also some 14th-century texts in Ragusan, but these show extensive Croatian and Venetian influence, to the point that it is difficult to discern which if any of their features are genuinely Dalmatian.

A notable feature of Ragusan was its preservation (without palatalisation) of Latin /k/ and /ɡ/ before front vowels, which can be seen in attested forms like colchitra < Latin culcitra.

In the Republic of Ragusa, official business was conducted in Ragusan until approximately the end of the 15th century. In 1472 the Senate banned the use (without permission) of "Slavic" or "any language other than Ragusan or Italian" for conducting legal disputes. Another piece of evidence is a letter by Elio Lampridio Cerva (1463–1520) that mentions "I remember how, when I was a boy, old men would carry on legal business in the Romance language that was called Ragusan".

=== Vegliote ===
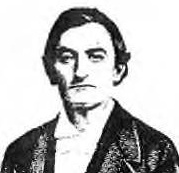
Tuone Udaina

This was spoken in Krk (Italian: Veglia, Dalmatian: Vikla). It is documented from the 19th century, in large part thanks to the efforts of the linguist Matteo Bartoli and his informant, Tuone Udaina. When they first met, Udaina had not spoken Vegliote in two decades and could only produce a sort of 'Dalmatianised' Venetian. As their interviews went on, he was able to recall more and more Vegliote from his youth, albeit in a form still tinged by his Venetian.

Like Ragusan, Vegliote did not participate in the broader Romance palatalisation of [k] and [ɡ] before front vowels. (Compare Vegliote [ɡeˈlut] "cold" and Italian [dʒeˈlato] < Latin gelatum.) Nevertheless it appears to have undergone a later, and independent, palatalisation of [k] to [tʃ] before the sounds [j i y], as in the word [tʃol] "arse" < *[kyl] < *[ˈkulu] < culum.

It was once thought that Vegliote, like Romanian, showed the sound-change /kt/ > /pt/, but the only example of this is /ˈwapto/ "eight" < octo, which was probably affected by analogy with /ˈsapto/ "seven" < septem.

==== Sample ====
From Udaina. This is a transcription in the International Phonetic Alphabet. Stress-marks have been omitted.

- Dalmatian pronunciation: [kuo̯nd ke fero i vetruni viv koli vapto ju koŋ totʃi ku̯int ju favlua iŋ veklisuŋ perku ju se jai̯ inparut kuo̯nd ke ju fero pelo ke avas tra jai̯n ke ju dat el prinsip da favlur kosai̯k iŋ veklisuŋ perke me ju inparuo̯t la maja non el mi tuo̯ta e la maja ni̯ena favlua kosai̯k iŋ veklisuŋ jali favlua ke jali kredua ke ju noŋ kapaja ma ju totʃ kapua koste parau̯le ke jali favlua iŋ veklisuŋ la maja noŋ me dekaja spi̯ata un pau̯k ke venaro el tuo̯ta e ju ɡe dekaro kel te dua per el tʃol]
- "When those eight old-timers were still alive I would speak Vegliote with everyone because I'd learnt it when I was little. I was three years old when I began to speak like that in Vegliote, because my grandmother taught me, and my mum and dad would speak like that in Vegliote. They would speak [in Vegliote] because they thought I didn't understand, but I understood all those words they were saying in Vegliote. My grandma would tell me 'Wait just a bit for daddy to come home and I'll tell him to spank you'".

=== Others ===
Dalmatian would also have been spoken on major islands and in towns along the Adriatic coast, namely Cres, Rab, Zadar, Trogir, Split, Kotor.

== Survival as a substrate ==
Likely 'Dalmatisms' in Croatian include:

- The toponyms Cavtat < civitate; Cres < c(h)erso; Krk < curicum; Makar(ska) < muccurum; Split < spaletum; Labin < albona; Solin < salona; Lovran < laurana; Supetar < sanctu petru; Sutomore < sancta maria
- Words in the Dubrovnik dialect like kȁpula "onion" < cepulla; kèlomna "pillar" < columna; kȑklo "fringe" < circulus; lìksija "lye" < lixivum; lùk(i)jerna "oil-lamp" < lucerna; otijemna "barge-pole" < antemna; òvrata "snapper" < aurata; pìkat "liver" < ficatum; prȉgati "to roast" < frigere; rèkesa "low tide" < recessa; trȁkta "drag-net" < tracta; úkljata "seabream" < oculata
- Words in Standard Croatian like jarbol "mast" < arbor; kònoba "tavern" < canaba; òliganj~lïganj~lìgnja "squid" < lolliginem

== See also ==
- Chakavian
- Istriot language

== Bibliography ==
- Bartoli, Matteo Giulio (1906). Das Dalmatische: altromanische Sprachreste von Veglia bis Ragusa und ihre Stellung in der Apennino-balkanische Romània. Vol. I, II. Vienna: Hölder.
- Bartoli, Matteo Giulio (2000). Il dalmatico: resti di un'antica lingua romanza parlata da Veglia a Ragusa e sua collocazione nella Romània appennino-balcanica. Rome: Treccani.
- Chambon, Jean-Pierre (2014). "Vers une seconde mort du dalmate? Note critique (du point de vue de la grammaire comparée) sur « un mythe de la linguistique romane »". Revue de linguistique romane. 78 (309–310): 6–9. doi:10.5169/seals-842246.
- Hadlich, Roger L. (1965). The Phonological History of Vegliote. Studies in the Romance Languages and Literatures. Vol. 52. Chapel Hill: University of North Carolina Press.
- Ive, Antonio (1886). "L'antico dialetto di Veglia". Archivio Glottologico Italiano. 9: 115–187.
- Maiden, Martin (30 June 2020). "Dalmatian (Vegliote)". Oxford Research Encyclopedia of Linguistics. Oxford University. doi:10.1093/acrefore/9780199384655.013.726. ISBN 978-0-19-938465-5.
- Muljačić, Žarko (1997). "Il gruppo linguistico illiro-romazo". In Holtus, Günter; Kramer, Johannes; Schweickard, Wolfgang (eds.). Italica et Romanica: Festschrift für Max Pfister zum 65. Geburtstag III. Tübingen: Niemeyer. pp. 59–72.
- Muljačić, Žarko (2003). "O dalmatoromanizmima u Marulićevim djelima". Colloquia Maruliana. 12: 131–142.
- Trummer, Manfred (1998). "Südosteuropäische Sprachen und Romanisch". In Holtus, Günter; Metzeltin, Michael & Schmitt, Christian (eds.). Lexikon der Romanistischen Linguistik. Beihefte zur Zeitschrift für romanische Philologie. Vol. 7: Kontakt, Migration und Kunstsprachen. Kontrastivität, Klassifikation und Typologie. Tübingen: Niemeyer. pp. 134–184.
- Vuletić, Nikola (2013). "Le dalmate: panorama des idées sur un mythe de la linguistique romane". Histoire Épistémologie Langage. 35: 45–64.
