= Vastese =

Romance language of Abruzzo, Italy

- Lu Vastarol
- Lu Uâʃtaréule
- Region: Italy
- Language family: Indo-European: Italic; Latino-Faliscan; Latin; Romance; Italo-Western; Italo-Dalmatian; Italo-Romance; Intermediate Southern Italian; Abruzzese; Vastese

Language codes
- ISO 639-2: nap
- ISO 639-3: nap (Neapolitan)

A book of Vastese popular phrases written by the poet Luigi Anelli

Vastese (Vastese: Lu Uâʃtaréule or Lu indialett di lu Uašt, meaning 'the dialect of Vasto') is an Abruzzese dialect of Neapolitan language spoken in the town of Vasto. It is not spoken in towns nearby.

== History ==
The endonym — the name its speakers use for the language — is Lu Uâʃtaréule. This term is known to have originated in the sixth century AD.

== Demography ==
Today Vastese is spoken monolingually only by residents of Vasto in their 80s and 90s, bilingually by many residents in their 70s, and many middle-aged residents are passive speakers, while most younger residents have no comprehension.

The Vasto Club in Australia is a club organized for migrants to Australia from Vasto.

== Phonology ==
Vastese has more vowel distinctions than Italian. It has vowels that are not in Italian, such as the open front unrounded vowel /æ/. Vastese uses an open back rounded vowel /ɒ/ for the start of the word uâʃtə. It also uses the mid central vowel /ə/. Vastese also uses several diphthongs not used in Italian such as /aʊ/, /eʊ/, and /aɪ/.

The influence of /i/, /u/, /Ī/, or /Ū/ upon /æ/, turns it into either /e/ or /je/.

== See also ==
- Central Italian
- Southern Italian
- Languages of Italy
- Abruzzo
