= Neapolitan language =

Italo-Romance language spoken in Italy

Neapolitan
- napulitano
- Native to: Italy
- Region: Campania
- Native speakers: 5.7 million (2002)
- Language family: Indo-European: Italic; Latino-Faliscan; Latinic; Romance; Italo-Western; Italo-Dalmatian; Italo-Romance; Neapolitan
- Dialects: Arianese; Barese; Benevento; Cilentan; Irpinian; Molisan; Tarantino; Southern Latian; Vastese; Castelmezzano; Cosentian

Language codes
- ISO 639-2: nap
- ISO 639-3: nap
- Glottolog: neap1235 Continental Southern Italian sout3126 South Lucanian = (Vd) Lausberg
- Southern Italo-Romance languages

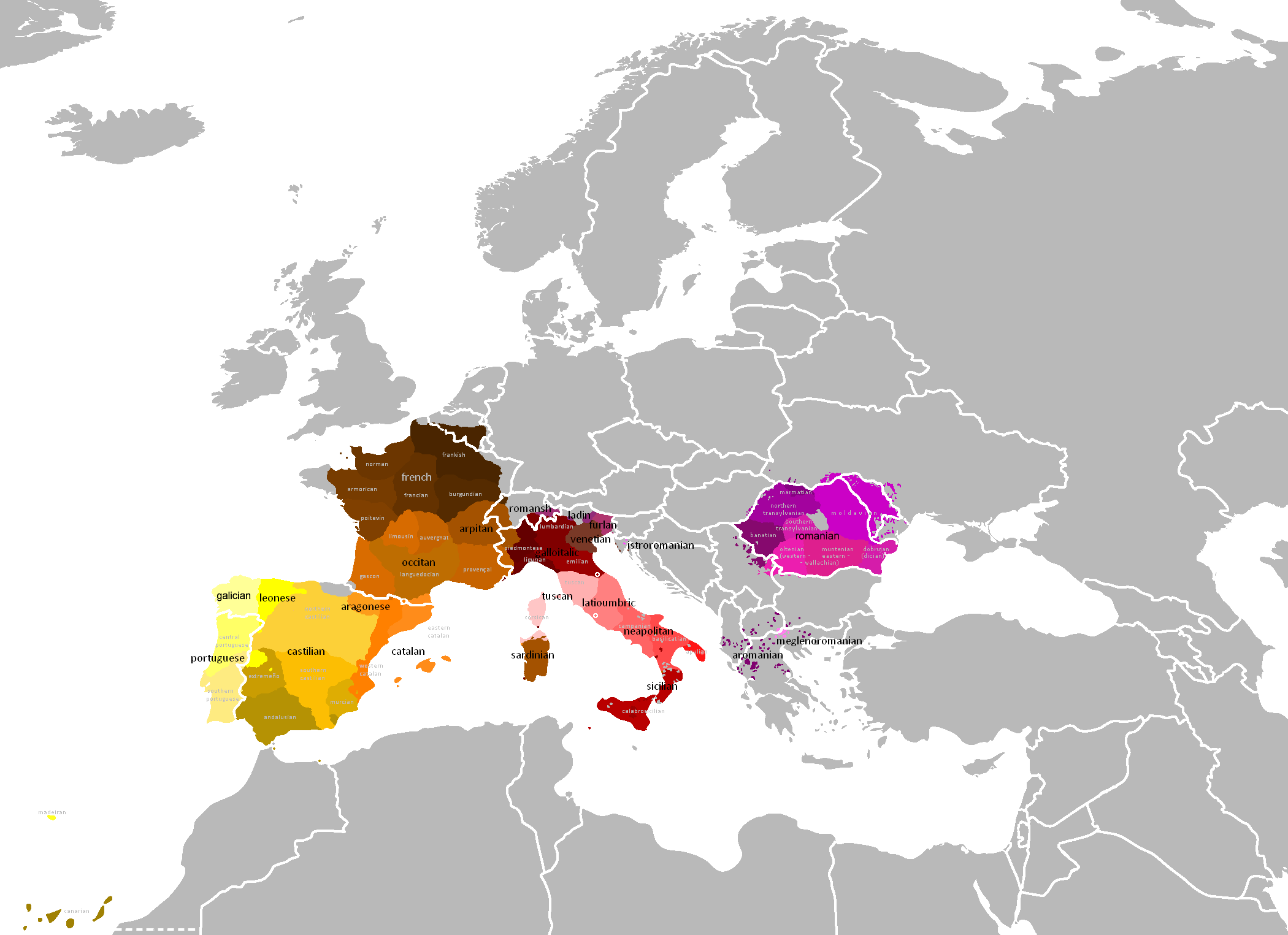
- Neapolitan as part of the European Romance languages

Neapolitan (autonym: ('o n)napulitano [(o n)napuliˈtɑːnə]; Italian: napoletano), is a Romance language of the Italo-Dalmatian branch spoken in most of continental Southern Italy. It is named after the Kingdom of Naples, which once covered most of the area, and the city of Naples was its capital. On 14 October 2008, a law by the Region of Campania stated that Neapolitan was to be protected.

While the language group is native to much of continental Southern Italy or the former Kingdom of Naples, the terms Neapolitan, napulitano or napoletano may also instead refer more narrowly to the specific variety spoken natively in the city of Naples and the immediately surrounding Naples metropolitan area and Campania region. The present article mostly deals with this variety, which enjoys a certain degree of prestige and has historically wide written attestations.

== Distribution ==
A Neapolitan speaker, recorded in Italy

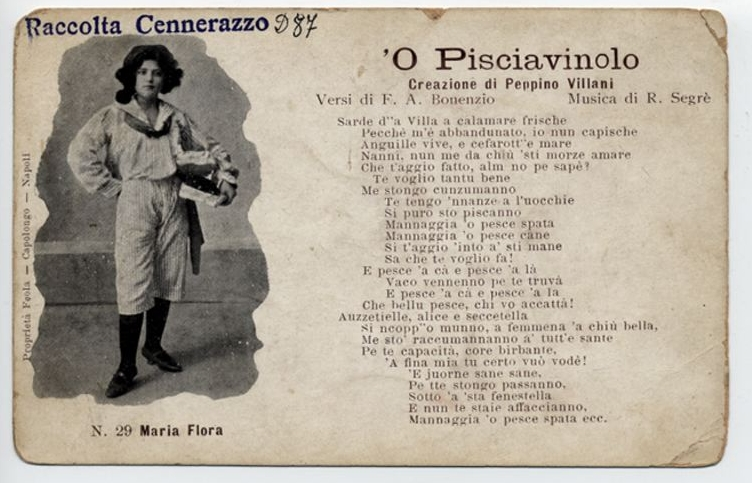
1895 song in Neapolitan

Largely due to massive Southern Italian migration in the late 19th century and 20th century, there are also a number of Neapolitan speakers in Italian diaspora communities in the United States, Canada, Australia, Brazil, Argentina, Uruguay, Mexico, and Venezuela. However, in the United States, traditional Neapolitan has had considerable contact with English and the Sicilian languages spoken by Sicilian and Calabrian immigrants living alongside Neapolitan-speaking immigrants and so the Neapolitan in the US is now significantly different from the contemporary Neapolitan spoken in Naples. English words are often used in place of Neapolitan words, especially among second-generation speakers. In Naples the effect of Italian on Neapolitan has been similar due to increasing displacement of Neapolitan by the national language in daily life.

== Classification ==
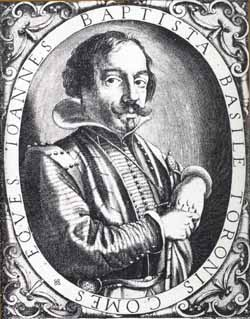
Giambattista Basile (1566–1632), author of a collection of fairy tales in Neapolitan that includes the earliest known versions of Rapunzel and Cinderella

Neapolitan is a Romance language and is considered as part of Southern Italo-Romance. There are notable differences among the various dialects, but they are all generally mutually intelligible.

Italian and Neapolitan are of variable mutual comprehensibility, depending on affective and linguistic factors. There are notable grammatical differences, such as Neapolitan having nouns in the neuter form and a unique plural formation, as well as historical phonological developments, which often obscure the cognacy of lexical items.

Its evolution has been similar to that of Italian and other Romance languages from their roots in Vulgar Latin. It may reflect a pre-Latin Oscan substratum, as in the pronunciation of the d sound as an r sound (rhotacism) at the beginning of a word or between two vowels: e.g. doje (feminine) or duje (masculine), meaning "two", is pronounced, and often spelled, as roje/ruje; vedé ("to see") as veré, and often spelled so; also cadé/caré ("to fall") and Madonna/Maronna. Another purported Oscan influence is the historical assimilation of the consonant cluster /nd/ as /nn/, pronounced [nː] (this is generally reflected in spelling more consistently: munno vs Italian mondo "world"; quanno vs Italian quando "when"), along with the development of /mb/ as /mm/~[mː] (tammuro vs Italian tamburo "drum"), also consistently reflected in spelling. Other effects of the Oscan substratum are postulated, but substratum claims are highly controversial. Neapolitan has mostly Italian language roots and an adstratum influenced by other Romance languages (Catalan, Spanish and Franco-Provençal), Germanic languages and Greek (both ancient and modern). The language had never been standardized, and the word for tree has three different spellings: arbero, arvero and àvaro.

Neapolitan has enjoyed a rich literary, musical and theatrical history (notably Giambattista Basile, Eduardo Scarpetta, his son Eduardo De Filippo, Salvatore Di Giacomo and Totò). Thanks to this heritage and the musical work of Renato Carosone in the 1950s, Neapolitan is still in use in popular music, even gaining national popularity in the songs of Pino Daniele and the Nuova Compagnia di Canto Popolare.

The language has no official status within Italy and is not taught in schools. The University of Naples Federico II offers (from 2003) courses in Campanian Dialectology at the faculty of Sociology, whose actual aim is not to teach students to speak the language but to study its history, usage, literature and social role. There are also ongoing legislative attempts at the national level to have it recognized as an official minority language of Italy. It is a recognized ISO 639 Joint Advisory Committee language with the ISO 639-3 language code of nap.

Here is the IPA pronunciation of the Neapolitan spoken in the city of Naples:

English	Italian (standard)	Neapolitan (standard)	Neapolitan (diacritics)	IPA (Neapolitan)
Our Father who art in heaven,	Padre Nostro, che sei nei cieli,	Pate nuoste ca staje 'n cielo,	Patë nuóstë ca stajë 'n ciélö,	[ˈpɑːtə ˈnwostə ka ˈstɑːjə nˈdʒjeːlə]
hallowed be thy name	Sia santificato il tuo nome.	santificammo 'o nomme tuojo.	santificàmmö 'o nómmë tuójö.	[sandifiˈkamm(ə) o ˈnommə ˈtwoːjə]
Thy kingdom come,	Venga il tuo regno,	Faje veni' 'o regno tuojo,	Fajë vënì' 'o règnö tuójö,	[ˈfɑːjə vəˈni o ˈrɛɲɲə ˈtwoːjə]
Thy will be done,	Sia fatta la tua volontá,	sempe c'a vuluntà toja,	sèmpë c'a vuluntà tòjä,	[ˈsɛmbə ˈkɑ: vulunˈda (t)ˈtɔːjə]
on earth as it is in heaven.	Come in cielo, così in terra.	accussì 'n cielo, accussì 'n terra.	accussì 'n ciélö, accussì 'n tèrrä.	[akkusˈsi nˈdʒjeːlə akkusˈsi nˈdɛrrə]
Give us this day our daily bread	Dacci oggi il nostro pane quotidiano,	Fance ave' 'o pane tutte 'e juorne,	Fancë avé' 'o panë tuttë 'e juórnë,	[ˈfandʒ aˈve o pˈpɑːnə ˈtutt e ˈjwornə]
and forgive us our trespasses	E rimetti a noi i nostri debiti	e liévace 'e riébbete	e liéväcë 'e riébbëtë	[e lˈljeːvəʃ(ə) e ˈrjebbətə]
as we forgive those who trespass against us,	Come noi li rimettiamo ai nostri debitori.	cumme nuje 'e luvamme all'ate.	cummë nujë 'e luvàmmë all'atë.	[ˈkummə ˈnuːjə e lluˈwammə alˈlɑːtə]
and lead us not into temptation,	E non ci indurre in tentazione,	Nun ce fa' spanteca',	Nun cë fa' spantëcà',	[nun dʒə ˈfa ʃpandəˈka]
but deliver us from evil.	Ma liberaci dal male.	e liévace 'o male 'a tuorno.	e liéväcë 'o malë 'a tuórnö.	[e lˈljeːvəʃ(ə) o mˈmɑːl(ə) a ˈtwornə]
Amen.	Amen.	Ammèn.	Ammèn.	[amˈmɛnn(ə)]

== Alphabet and pronunciation ==
Neapolitan orthography consists of 22 Latin letters. Much like Italian orthography, it does not contain k, w, x, or y even though these letters may be found in some foreign loan words; unlike Italian, it does contain the letter j.

All Romance languages are closely related. Although Neapolitan shares a high degree of its vocabulary with Tuscan-derived Italian, the official language of Italy, differences in pronunciation can make the connection unrecognizable to those without knowledge of Neapolitan. The most striking phonological difference is the Neapolitan weakening of unstressed vowels into schwa (schwa is pronounced like the a in about or the u in upon). (Note: In recent studies on Neapolitan variants in Campania, there has been a tendency to mark vowels pronounced as schwa ⟨ə⟩ with diaeresis (◌̈). While it may help novice speakers, it is not an established trait of the Neapolitan orthography.) However, it is also possible (and quite common for some Neapolitans) to speak Italian with a "Neapolitan accent"; that is, by pronouncing un-stressed vowels as schwa or by pronouncing the phoneme /s/ as [ʃ] (like the sh in ship) instead of [s] (like the s in sea or the ss in pass) when /s/ is in initial position followed by a consonant, but not when it is followed by a dental occlusive /t/ or /d/ (at least in the purest form of the language) but by otherwise using the vocabulary and grammatical forms of Italian.

Therefore, while pronunciation presents the strongest barrier to comprehension, the grammar of Neapolitan is what sets it apart from Italian. In Neapolitan, for example, the gender and number of a word is expressed by a change in the accented vowel because it no longer distinguishes final unstressed /a/, /e/ and /o/ (e.g. luongo [ˈlwoŋɡə], longa [ˈloŋɡə]; Italian lungo, lunga; masc. "long", fem. "long"), whereas in Italian it is expressed by a change in the final vowel. These and other morpho-syntactic differences distinguish the Neapolitan language from the Italian language and the Neapolitan accent.

Neapolitan has had a significant influence on the intonation of Rioplatense Spanish spoken in Buenos Aires and the surrounding region of Argentina and in the entire country of Uruguay.

=== Vowels ===
While there are only five graphic vowels in Neapolitan, phonemically, there are eight. Stressed vowels e and o can be either "closed" or "open" and the pronunciation is different for the two. The grave accent (à, è, ò) is used to denote open vowels, and the acute accent (é, í, ó, ú) is used to denote closed vowels, with alternative ì and ù. However, accent marks are not commonly used in the actual spelling of words except when they occur on the final syllable of a word, such as Totò, arrivà, or pecché, and when they appear here in other positions, it is only to demonstrate where the stress, or accent, falls in some words. Also, the circumflex is used to mark a long vowel where it would not normally occur (e.g. sî "you are").

Vowels
	Front	Central	Back
High	i		u
High-mid	e	ə	o
Low-mid	ɛ	ə	ɔ
Low		a	

Letter	IPA
a	/a/~[ɑ] /ə/
e	/ɛ/ /e/ /ə/
o	/ɔ/ /o/ /ə/
i	/i/ /j/
u	/u/ /w/

=== Consonants ===
		Labial	Dental/Alveolar		Post- alveolar	Palatal	Velar
		Labial	central	sibilant	Post- alveolar	Palatal	Velar
Nasal		m	n			ɲ	(ŋ)
Plosive/ Affricate	voiceless	p	t	t͡s	t͡ʃ		k
Plosive/ Affricate	voiced	b	d	(d͡z)	d͡ʒ		ɡ
Fricative	voiceless	f		s	ʃ		
Fricative	voiced	v		(z)	(ʒ)	ʎ	
Lateral			l			ʎ	
Approximant		w				j	
Trill/Tap			r ~ ɾ				

Letter	IPA
p	/p/ [b]
b	/b/
t	/t/ [d]
d	/d/
c	/t͡ʃ/~[ʃ] [d͡ʒ] /k/ [ɡ]
g	/d͡ʒ/, /ɡ/
f	/f/
v	/v/
s	/s/ [d͡z] [z]
s	/ʃ/ [ʒ]
z	/t͡s/ [d͡z]
j	/j/
l	/l/
m	/m/
n	/n/
r	/r/~[ɾ]
q	/kʷ/
h	
x	/k(ə)s/

=== Digraphs and trigraphs ===
The following consonants are always geminated when they follow a vowel.

Letter	IPA
gn	/ɲ/
gl(i)	/ʎ/~[ʝ]
sc	/ʃ/

== Grammar ==
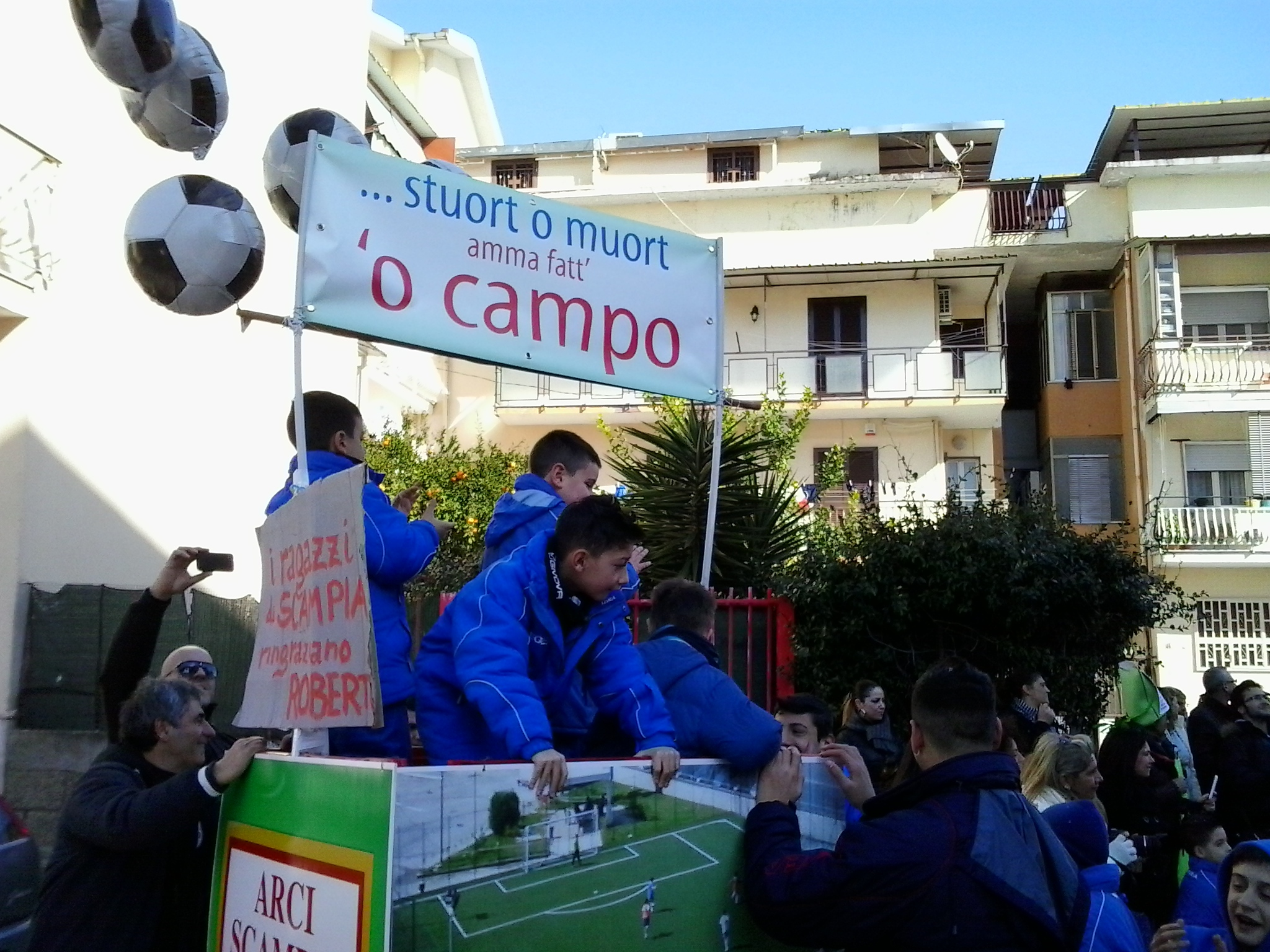
Neapolitan text at the Scampia Carnival; note the definite article 'o.

=== Definite articles ===
The Neapolitan classical definite articles (corresponding to the English word "the") are 'a (feminine singular), 'o (masculine singular) and 'e (plural for both). They are traditionally spelled with the apostrophe to signify the elided sound l.

Before a word beginning with a consonant:

	Singular	Plural
Masculine	'o	'e
Feminine	'a	'e C:
Neuter	'o C:	∅

"C:" = the initial consonant of the following word is geminated if followed by a vowel.

These definite articles are always pronounced distinctly.

Before a word beginning with a vowel, l' or ll' are used for both masculine and feminine, singular and plural. Although both forms can be found, the ll' form is by far the most common.

In Neapolitan, the gender of a noun is not easily determined by the article, so other means must be used. In the case of 'o, which can be either masculine singular or neuter singular (there is no neuter plural in Neapolitan), the initial consonant of the noun is doubled when it is neuter. For example, the name of a language in Neapolitan is always neuter, so if we see 'o nnapulitano we know it refers to the Neapolitan language, whereas 'o napulitano would refer to a Neapolitan man.

Likewise, since 'e can be either masculine or feminine plural, when it is feminine plural, the initial consonant of the noun is doubled. For example, consider 'a lista, which in Neapolitan is feminine singular, meaning "the list". In the plural, it becomes 'e lliste.

There can also be problems with nouns whose singular form ends in e. Since plural nouns usually end in e whether masculine or feminine, the masculine plural is often signaled orthographically, that is, by altering the spelling. As an example, consider the word guaglione, which means "boy" or (in the feminine form) "girl":

	Singular	Plural
Masculine	'o guaglione	'e guagliune
Feminine	'a guagliona	'e gguaglione

More will be said about these orthographically changing nouns in the section on Neapolitan nouns.

A couple of notes about consonant doubling:

- Doubling is a function of the article (and certain other words), and these same words may be seen in other contexts without the consonant doubled. More will be said about this in the section on consonant doubling.
- Doubling only occurs when a vowel follows the consonant. No doubling occurs if it is followed by another consonant, such as in the word spagnuolo (Spanish).

=== Indefinite articles ===
The Neapolitan indefinite articles, corresponding to the English a or an, are presented in the following table:

	Masculine	Feminine
Before words beginning with a consonant	nu	na
Before words beginning with a vowel	n'	

=== Verbal conjugation ===
In Neapolitan there are four finite moods: indicative, subjunctive, conditional and imperative, and three non-finite modes: infinitive, gerund and participle. Each mood has an active and a passive form. The only auxiliary verbs used in the active form is (h)avé (Eng. "to have", It. avere), which contrasts with Italian, in which the intransitive and reflexive verbs take èssere for their auxiliary. For example, we have:

Neapolitan

Aggio stato a Napule ajere.
AUX.have.1SG.PRES be.PTCP.PAST in Naples yesterday
I was in Naples yesterday.

Italian

Sono stato a Napoli ieri.
AUX.be.1S.PRES be.PTCP.PAST in Naples yesterday
I was in Naples yesterday.

=== Doubled initial consonants ===
In Neapolitan, many times the initial consonant of a word is doubled. This is called syntactic gemination (raddoppiamento sintattico in Italian). This linguistic phenomenon occurs also in Italian and in Finnish.

- All feminine plural nouns, preceded by the feminine plural definite article, 'e, or any feminine plural adjective, have their initial consonant doubled.
- All neuter singular nouns, when preceded by the neuter singular definite article, 'o, or by a neuter singular adjective, have their initial consonant doubled.
- In addition, other words also trigger this doubling. Below is a list of words that trigger the doubling of the initial consonant of the following word.

However, when there is a pause after the "trigger" word, the phonological doubling does not occur (e.g. tu sî (g)guaglione, "You are a boy", where sî is a "trigger" word causing doubling of the initial consonant in guaglione, but in the phrase 'e do sî, guaglió? "Where are you from, boy?", no doubling occurs. Neither does doubling occur when the initial consonant is followed by another consonant (other than l or r), e.g. 'o ttaliano "the Italian language", but 'o spagnuolo "the Spanish language", where 'o is the neuter definite article). This doubling phenomenon happens phonologically (in pronunciation), and the doubling is not always represented in spelling. However, many Neapolitan-language editions do represent syntactic gemination in writing, resulting in many words spelled with initial double consonants. So, je so' pazzo ("I am crazy") may also be spelled je so' ppazzo (regardless of the spelling, it is pronounced with syntactic gemination). In Italian and Finnish, syntactic gemination is not reflected in writing.

==== Words that trigger doubling in pronunciation ====
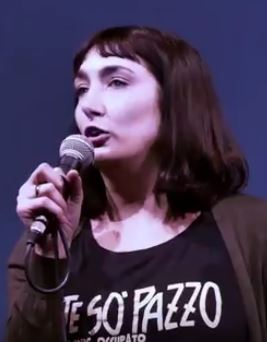
Viola Carofalo wearing a T-shirt with Neapolitan je so' pazzo ("I am crazy.")

- The conjunctions e and né but not o (e.g. pane e (c)caso; né (p)pane né (c)caso; but pane o caso)
- The prepositions a, pe, cu (e.g. a (m)me; pe (t)te; cu (v)vuje)
- The negation nu, short for nun (e.g. nu ddicere niente)
- The indefinites ogne, cocche (e.g. ogne (c)casa; cocche (c)cosa)
- Interrogative che and relative che but not ca (e.g. che (p)piense? che (f)femmena! che (c)capa!)
- accussí (e.g. accussí (b)bello)
- From the verb "essere", so'; sî; è but not songo (e.g. je so' (p)pazzo; tu sî (f)fesso; chella è (M)Maria; chilli so' (c)cafune but chilli songo cafune)
- chiú (e.g. chiú (p)poco)
- The number tre (e.g. tre (s)segge)
- The neuter definite article 'o (e.g. 'o (p)pane, but nu poco 'e pane)
- The neuter pronoun 'o (e.g. 'o (t)tiene 'o (p)pane?)
- Demonstrative adjectives chistu and chillu which refer to neuter nouns in indefinite quantities (e.g. chistu (f)fierro; chillu (p)pane) but not in definite quantities (e.g. Chistu fierro; chillu pane)
- The feminine plural definite article 'e (e.g. 'e (s)segge; 'e (g)guaglione)
- The plural feminine pronoun 'e, e.g., 'e (g)guaglione 'e (c)chiamme tu? "
- The plural masculine pronoun 'e preceding a verb, but not when 'e is an article; in 'e guagliune 'e (c)chiamme tu?, the first 'e is an article, so it does not trigger doubling; the second 'e does trigger doubling because it is a masculine plural pronoun.
- The locative lloco (e.g. lloco (s)sotto)
- From the verb stà: sto' (e.g. sto' (p)parlanno)
- From the verb puté: può; pô (e.g. isso pô (s)sapé)
- Special case Spiritu (S)Santo

== See also ==
- Languages of Italy
- Oscan language
- Sicilian language

== Additional sources ==
- Iandolo, Carlo (2001). A lengua 'e Pulecenella: Grammatica napoletana (in Italian). Sorrento: Franco Di Mauro. ISBN 978-8885263710.
- De Blasi, Nicola; Imperatore, Luigi (2001). Il napoletano parlato e scritto: Con note di grammatica storica [Written and Spoken Neapolitan: With Notes on Historic Grammar] (in Italian) (2nd ed.). Napoli: Dante & Descartes. ISBN 978-8888142050.
- Del Vecchio, Emilano (3 July 2014). "Neapolitan: A Great Cultural Heritage". TermCoord.
- Verde, Massimiliano (17 June 2017). "Consegnato il primo Certificato Europeo di Lingua Napoletana" [Granted the first European Certificate of the Neapolitan language]. NapoliToday (in Italian). First Course of Neapolitan Language according to the QCER CEFR with the Patronage of City of Naples realized by Dr.Massimiliano Verde "Corso di Lingua e Cultura Napoletana" with a document of study in Neapolitan Language by Dr.Verde

First public document in Neapolitan Language of the XXI century according to a text of Dr.Verde; the touristic Map of the III Municipality of Naples in Neapolitan Language:

- Palmieri, Paola (22 June 2017). "Napoli per turisti: arriva la prima mappa con info in napoletano e italiano!" [Naples for tourists: Released the first map with text in Neapolitan and Italian!]. Grandenapoli (in Italian).
- "A Napoli nasce la prima mappa turistica con info in italiano e napoletano". Vesuvio Live (in Italian). 21 June 2017.
