= Extreme Southern Italian =

Romance languages spoken in Southern Italy

- dialetti italiani meridionali estremi
- Native to: Italy
- Region: Apulia (Salento); Calabria; Campania (Cilento); Sicily
- Ethnicity: Italians, Sicilians, Grikos
- Native speakers: 4.7 million (2002)
- Language family: Indo-European: Italic; Latino-Faliscan; Latin; Romance; Italo-Western; Italo-Dalmatian; Italo-Romance; Extreme Southern Italian

Language codes
- ISO 639-3: –
- Glottolog: sici1248
- Extreme Southern Italian dialects

The Extreme Southern Italian dialects are a set of languages spoken mainly in Sicily, southern Salento, southern Cilento, and most of Calabria with common phonetic and syntactic characteristics such as to constitute a single group. The name "Italian" refers to the fact that these languages are spoken in Italy, not that they are part of the Italian language (see Languages of Italy § Language or dialect).

Today, varieties of Extreme Southern Italian are spoken daily, although their use is limited to informal contexts and is mostly oral. There are examples of full literary uses with contests (mostly poetry) and theatrical performances.

== Background ==
The areas where Extreme Southern dialects are found today roughly trace that same territory where both Ancient Greek and Medieval Byzantine hegemonies happened to be the strongest.

== Varieties ==
- Sicilian, spoken on the island of Sicily: Western Sicilian; Central Metafonetica; Southeast Metafonetica; Ennese; Eastern Nonmetafonetica; Messinese.
- Sicilian on other islands: Isole Eolie, on the Aeolian Islands; Pantesco, on the island of Pantelleria.
- Calabro, or Central-Southern Calabrian: spoken in the central and southern areas of the region of Calabria.
- Salentino, spoken in the Salento region of southern Apulia.
- Cilentan, spoken in the Cilento region of southern Campania.

== Phonological features ==
The main distinguishing characteristics, which all Extreme Southern Italian lects have in common, and which differentiate them from the rest of the Southern Italian lects, are:

- Sicilian vowel system, a characteristic not present in many dialects of central-northern Calabria;
  - presence of three well-perceptible word-final vowels in most dialects of this area: -a, -i, -u; however -e and -o can also be sometimes found in Cosentino, southern Cilentan and southern Salentino.
- clear cacuminal or retroflex pronunciation of -DD- (ultimately deriving from -LL-).
- maintenance of voiceless occlusive consonants after the nasals: the word for "eats" will therefore be pronounced mancia and not mangia. However, this phenomenon is absent in Cosentino;
- absence of apocopated infinitives spread from the Upper Mezzogiorno to Tuscany (therefore one has cantare or cantari and not cantà). Also in this respect the Cosentino dialect is an exception;
- use of the preterite with endings similar to the Italian remote past and the non-distinction between past perfect (pluperfect) and remote pluperfect; however, this phenomenon is absent in central-northern Calabria (north of the Lamezia Terme-Sersale-Crotone line).

== See also ==
- Languages of Italy
- Maltese Italian

== Bibliography ==
- Francesco Avolio, Lingue e dialetti d'Italia, 2012, Carocci editore, Roma, ed=2, ISBN 978-88-430-5203-5.
- Michele Loporcaro, Profilo linguistico dei dialetti italiani, Laterza, Bari, 2013. ISBN 978-8859300069
- Giuseppe Antonio Martino - Ettore Alvaro, Dizionario dei dialetti della Calabria meridionale, Qualecultura, Vibo Valentia 2010. ISBN 978-88-95270-21-0.
- Gerhard Rohlfs, Nuovo Dizionario Dialettale della Calabria. Longo, Ravenna, 1977 ISBN 88-8063-076-8 (6th reedition, 2001)
- Gerhard Rohlfs, Dizionario dialettale delle tre Calabrie. Milano-Halle, 1932-1939.
- Gerhard Rohlfs, Vocabolario supplementare dei dialetti delle Tre Calabrie (che comprende il dialetto greco-calabro di Bova) con repertorio toponomastico. Verl. d. Bayer. Akad. d. Wiss., München, 2 volumi, 1966-1967
- Gerhard Rohlfs, Vocabolario dei dialetti salentini (Terra d'Otranto). Verl. d. Bayer. Akad. d. Wiss., München, 2 volumi (1956-1957) e 1 suppl. (1961)
- Gerhard Rohlfs, Supplemento ai vocabolari siciliani. Verlag der Bayer, München, Akad. d. Wiss., 1977
- Gerhard Rohlfs, Historische Sprachschichten im modernen Sizilien. Verlag der Bayer, München, Akad. d. Wiss., 1975
- Gerhard Rohlfs, Studi linguistici sulla Lucania e sul Cilento. Congedo Editore, Galatina, 1988 (translation by Elda Morlicchio, Atti e memorie N. 3, Università degli Studi della Basilicata).
- Gerhard Rohlfs, Mundarten und Griechentum des Cilento, in Zeitschrift für Romanische Philologie, 57, 1937, pp. 421– 461
