= Tuone Udaina =

Last known speaker of Dalmatian (1823–1898)

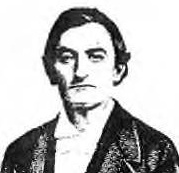
- Born: 1823; Veglia, Austrian Empire (now Krk, Croatia)
- Died: 10 June 1898 (aged 74–75); Veglia, Austria-Hungary
- Other name: Antonio Udina
- Known for: Being the last person to have any active knowledge of the Dalmatian language

Tuone "Burbur" Udaina (1823 – 10 June 1898; Antonio Udina in Italian) was the last known speaker of Dalmatian, a Romance language that evolved from Latin along the eastern coast of the Adriatic Sea. He was the main source of knowledge about his parents' dialect, that of the island of Veglia, for the linguist Matteo Bartoli, who recorded it in 1897.

Udaina bore the nickname Burbur, the etymology of which is uncertain. Bartoli tentatively associated it with burbero, an Italian word for a surly, gruff, or ill-tempered person. Other interpretations include "barbarian" and "barber". He worked as a marine postman and as a sexton.

When Udaina was 74, he was killed in an explosion during road construction on June 10, 1898. Since then, the Dalmatian language is generally assumed to have become extinct as no other speakers of the language were found or known to have lived.

== Bibliography ==
- Brahms, William B. (2005). Notable Last Facts: A Compendium of Endings, Conclusions, Terminations and Final Events throughout History. Original from the University of Michigan: Reference Desk Press. ISBN 978-0-9765325-0-7.
- Kapović, Mate (2008). Uvod u indoeuropsku lingvistiku (PDF) (in Croatian). Zagreb: Matica hrvatska. ISBN 978-953-150-847-6.
- Mišur, Ivo (2018). "Alan Žic-Teklin, Tako je govorio Burbur – izumrli dalmatski jezik i njegov krčki dijalekt veljotski" (PDF). Časopis za suvremenu povijest (in Croatian). 50 (1). Zagreb: Croatian Institute of History: 197–200.
- Roegiest, Eugeen (2006). Vers les sources des langues romanes: un itinéraire linguistique à travers la Romania (in French). ACCO. ISBN 90-334-6094-7.
- Spicijarić, Nina (2009). "Pristup Giacoma Scottija, Žarka Muljačića i Petra Strčića, veljotski/vegliotto/veclisun romanskomu krčkomu govoru i njegovu "posljednjem govorniku"" [Approach of Giacomo Scotti, Žarko Muljačić and Petar Strčić to veclisun romance Krk speech and its "last speaker"] (PDF). Rijeka (in Croatian). XIV (2): 195–205. ISSN 1330-6995.
- Strčić, Petar (1998). "Otok Krk u doba "posljednjega" dalmatofona Antona Udine Burbura (XIX. st.)" (PDF). Folia onomastica Croatica (in Croatian) (7). Zagreb: Croatian Academy of Sciences and Arts: 237–266.
