= Tuscan gorgia =

Phonetic phenomenon in Tuscan Italian

The Tuscan gorgia (Italian: gorgia toscana [ˈɡɔrdʒa tosˈkaːna], Tuscan pronunciation: [ˈɡɔɾdʒa θosˈkaːna]; 'Tuscan throat') is a phonetic phenomenon governed by a complex of allophonic rules characteristic of the Tuscan dialects, in Tuscany, Italy, especially the central ones, with Florence traditionally viewed as the center.

== Description ==
The gorgia affects the voiceless stops /k/ /t/ and /p/, which are pronounced as fricative consonants in post-vocalic position (when not blocked by the competing phenomenon of syntactic gemination):

- /k/ → [h]
- /t/ → [θ]
- /p/ → [ɸ]

An example: the word identificare ('to identify') /identifiˈkare/ is pronounced by a Tuscan speaker as [ˌidentifiˈhaːɾe], not as [identifiˈkaːre], as standard Italian phonology would require. The rule is sensitive to pause, but not word boundary, so that /la ˈkasa/ ('the house') is realized as [la ˈhaːsa], while the two phonemes /t/ of /la ˈtuta/ 'the overalls' are interdental [θ] in [la ˈθuːθa], and /p/ is pronounced [ɸ] so /la ˈpipa/ 'the pipe (for smoking)' emerges as [la ˈɸiːɸa].

(In some areas the voiced counterparts /ɡ/ /d/ /b/ can also appear as fricative approximants [ɣ] [ð] [β], especially in fast or unguarded speech. This, however, appears more widespread elsewhere in the Mediterranean, being standard in Spanish and Greek.)

In a stressed syllable, /k t p/, preceded by another stop, can occasionally be realized as true aspirates [kʰ tʰ pʰ], especially if the stop is the same, for example [apˈpʰunto] (appunto, 'note'), [atˈtʰiŋɡo] (attingo, 'I draw on'), or [a kˈkʰaːsa] (a casa, 'at home', with phonosyntactic strengthening due to the preposition).

== Geographical distribution ==
Establishing a hierarchy of weakening within the class /k t p/ is not an easy task. Recent studies have called into question the traditional view that mutation of /p/ and /t/ is less widespread geographically than /k/ → [h], and in areas where the rule is not automatic, /p/ is often more likely to weaken than /t/ or /k/.

On the other hand, deletion in rapid speech always affects /k/ first and foremost wherever it occurs, but /t/ reduces less often to [h], especially in the most common forms such as participles ([anˈdaːho] andato 'gone'). Fricativisation of /k/ is by far the most perceptually salient of the three, however, and so it has become a stereotype of Tuscan dialects.

The phenomenon is more evident and finds its irradiation point in the city of Florence. From there, the gorgia spreads its influence along the entire Arno valley, losing strength nearer the coast. On the coast, /p/ and usually /t/ are not affected. The weakening of /k/ is a linguistic continuum in the entire Arno valley, in the cities of Prato, Pistoia, Montecatini Terme, Lucca, Pisa, Livorno.

In the northwest, it is present to some extent in Versilia. In the east, it extends over the Pratomagno to include Bibbiena and its outlying areas, where /k t p/ are sometimes affected, both fully occlusive [k], [t], [p] and lenited (lax, unvoiced) allophones being the major alternates.

The Apennine Mountains are the northern border of the phenomenon, and while a definite southern border has not been established, it is present in Siena and further south to at least San Quirico d'Orcia. In the far south of Tuscany, it gives way to the lenition (laxing) typical of northern and coastal Lazio.

== History ==
The Tuscan gorgia arose perhaps as late as the Middle Ages as a natural phonetic phenomenon, much like the consonant voicing that affected the Gallo-Italic languages and the rest of the Western Romance languages (now phonemicised as in /aˈmika/ 'friend' (f.) > /aˈmiɡa/), but it remained allophonic in Tuscany, as laxing or voicing generally does elsewhere in Central Italy and in Corsica.

Although it was once hypothesised that the gorgia phenomena are the continuation of similar features in the language that predated Romanization of the area, Etruscan, that view is no longer held by most specialists.

Instead, it is increasingly accepted as being a local form of the same consonant weakening that affects other speech in Central Italy, extending far beyond, to Western Romance. Support for that hypothesis can be found in several facts:

- The phonetic details of Etruscan are unknown and so it is impossible to identify their continuance.
- There is no mention of the phenomenon until the 16th century, and no trace in older writing (since the gorgia is a phonetic phenomenon, not phonemic, its appearance in writing might not be expected, but it appears in writing in the 19th century).
- The gorgia is less evident in Lucca and does not exist in the far south of Tuscany or in Lazio, where the Etruscan civilization was quite concentrated.
- Sociolinguistic studies in Eastern Tuscany (such as Cravens and Giannelli 1995, Pacini 1998) show that the gorgia competes with traditional laxing in the same postvocalic position, suggesting that the two results are phonetically different resolutions of the same phonological rule.
- The gorgia shows all the characteristics of a naturally-developed allophonic rule in its alternations with full plosives ([ˈkaːsa] 'house', [la ˈhaːsa] 'the house', [ˌtre kˈkaːse] 'three houses').
- Fricativisation of /k t p/ is common in the languages of the world. Similar processes have happened such as in proto-Germanic (which is why in Germanic languages there are words such as father, horn, three as opposed to Italian padre, corno, tre, from Grimm's law) and during the development of the Hungarian language and from Proto-Austronesian to Chamorro.

== See also ==
- Languages of Italy
- Tuscan dialect
- Grimm's law

== Sources ==
- Agostiniani, Luciano & Luciano Giannelli. 1983. Fonologia etrusca, fonetica toscana: Il problema del sostrato. Firenze: Olschki.
- Cravens, Thomas D. & Luciano Giannelli. 1995. Relative salience of gender and class in a situation of multiple competing norms. Language Variation and Change 7:261-285.
- Cravens, Thomas D. 2000. Sociolinguistic subversion of a phonological hierarchy. Word 51:1-19.
- Cravens, Thomas D. 2006. Microvariability in time and space: Reconstructing the past from the present, in Variation and Reconstruction, John Benjamins, Amsterdam, pp. 17–36
- Giannelli, Luciano. 2000. Toscana. Profilo dei dialetti italiani, 9. Pisa: Pacini.
- Hall, Robert A. (1949). "A note on "Gorgia Toscana"". Italica. 26 (1): 64–71. doi:10.2307/476061. JSTOR 476061.
- Hall, Robert A. (1956). "Ancora la "Gorgia Toscana"". Italica. 33 (4): 291–294. doi:10.2307/476973. JSTOR 476973.
- Izzo, Herbert J. 1972. Tuscan and Etruscan: The problem of linguistic substratum influence in Central Italy. Toronto: University of Toronto Press.
- Merlo, Clemente (1950). "Gorgia Toscana e sostrato etrusco". Italica. 27 (3): 253–255. doi:10.2307/476321. JSTOR 476321.
- Merlo, Clemente (1953). "Ancora della Gorgia Toscana". Italica. 30 (3): 167. doi:10.2307/477242. JSTOR 477242.
- Pacini, Beatrice. 1998. Il processo di cambiamento dell'indebolimento consonantico a Cortona: studio sociolinguistico. Rivista italiana di dialettologia 22:15-57.
- Politzer, Robert L. (1951). "Another note on "Gorgia Toscana"". Italica. 28 (3): 197–201. doi:10.2307/476424. JSTOR 476424.
- Trask, R. L. (2000). Dictionary of Historical and Comparative Linguistics. Edinburgh: Edinburgh University Press. ISBN 978-1-4744-7331-6. JSTOR 10.3366/j.ctvxcrt50.
