= Southern Italian Koiné =

Southern Italian koiné was a koiné language that had evolved due to contact between Naples, Amalfi, Salerno and other ports. It was spread by the Normans as a result of policies that favoured the Latin-rite Catholicism of the Holy See over the local Greek Rites, and Languages. Its spread may have contributed substantially to the then developing Sicilian language.
