= Irpinian dialect =

Dialect of Neapolitan

Irpinian
- Irpino
- Region: Province of Avellino
- Language family: Indo-European: Italic; Latino-Faliscan; Latinic; Romance; Italo-Western; Italo-Dalmatian; Italo-Romance; Intermediate Southern Italian; Campano; Irpinian

Language codes
- ISO 639-3: –
- IETF: nap-u-sd-itav

The Irpinian dialect, or Irpino, is the variety of the Neapolitan language which is spoken in and around the city of Avellino and most of its wider province, within the region of Campania in Italy.
