= Matteo Bartoli =

Italian linguist (1873–1946)

- Born: 22 November 1873; Albona, Austria-Hungary (now Labin, Croatia)
- Died: 23 January 1946 (aged 72); Turin, Kingdom of Italy
- Education: University of Vienna
- Known for: Last and most complete documentation of the Dalmatian language; Bartoli's law; the Neolinguistic school of dialectology
- Scientific career
- Fields: Linguistics, comparative linguistics, classical languages, Dalmatian language
- Workplaces: University of Turin

Matteo Giulio Bartoli (22 November 1873 – 23 January 1946) was an Italian linguist from Istria. He obtained a doctorate at the University of Vienna. He was influenced by certain theories of the Italian philosopher Benedetto Croce and the German linguist Karl Vossler. He later also studied with Jules Gilliéron in Paris. From Gilliéron he acquired a penchant for fieldwork, and from 1900 on, he published numerous dialectological studies of Istrian dialects.

In 1907, he became professor of the comparative history of classical and neo-Latin languages in the Faculty of Letters at the University of Turin, where he served until his death.

Among his most important works are is his study on the Dalmatian language, Das Dalmatische (2 vol. 1906). He also wrote Introduzione alla neolinguistica ("Introduction to neolinguistics", 1925) and Saggi di linguistica spaziale ("Essays in spatial linguistics", 1945) and was the teacher of Antonio Gramsci.

== Biography ==
Bartoli was born on 22 November 1873 in Albona, Istria, Austria-Hungary (today Labin in Croatia) He obtained a doctorate at the University of Vienna, where his adviser was Wilhelm Meyer-Lübke, in 1898.

He was a lecturer in historical linguistics at the University of Turin from 1908 until his death in 1946, he became famous for his contributions in the field of language geography, particularly his four rules on geographical areas. He contributed to the Atlante Linguistico Italiano and was a teacher of Antonio Gramsci.

Influenced greatly by his mentor Meyer-Lübke and by some of the theories of Benedetto Croce and Karl Vossler, he took a keen interest in Italian dialectology, a then emerging and methodologically advanced discipline, and wrote works on the Dalmatian language, including Das Dalmatische (1906). It is the only known complete description of the language, which is now extinct. It remains "the standard work on Dalmatian" and contains every known text in the language. Bartoli used data gathered in 1897 from the last speaker of Dalmatian, Tuone Udaina, who was killed in an explosives accident on 10 June 1898.

Bartoli died in Turin on 23 January 1946. He is buried in Turin's Monumental Cemetery.

== See also ==
- Neolinguistics, the school of diachronics and dialectology theorized by Matteo Bartoli in reaction to the Neogrammarians.
