= Italo-Western languages =

Romance language branch

Italo-Western
- Geographic distribution: Italian Peninsula, Switzerland, France, Belgium, Istria, Channel Islands, Iberia, Quebec, Latin America, Latin Africa parts of Oceania and some parts of Asia
- Linguistic classification: Indo-European: Italic; Latino-Faliscan; Latin; Romance; Italo-Western
- Early forms: Old Latin: Vulgar Latin; Proto-Romance
- Subdivisions: Italo-Dalmatian; Western Romance; Venetian; (Franco-Italian) †

Language codes
- Glottolog: ital1285

Italo-Western is, in some classifications, the largest branch of the Romance languages. It comprises two of the branches of Romance languages: Italo-Dalmatian and Western Romance. It excludes the Sardinian language and Eastern Romance.

== Italo-Dalmatian languages ==
Based on the criterion of mutual intelligibility, Dalby lists four languages: Italian (Tuscan), Corsican, Neapolitan–Sicilian-Central Italian, and Dalmatian.

=== Dalmatian Romance ===
- The Dalmatian language was spoken in the Dalmatia region of Croatia. It became extinct in the 19th century.
- The Istriot language is a moribund variety spoken in the southwestern part of Istrian peninsula in Croatia.

=== Venetian ===
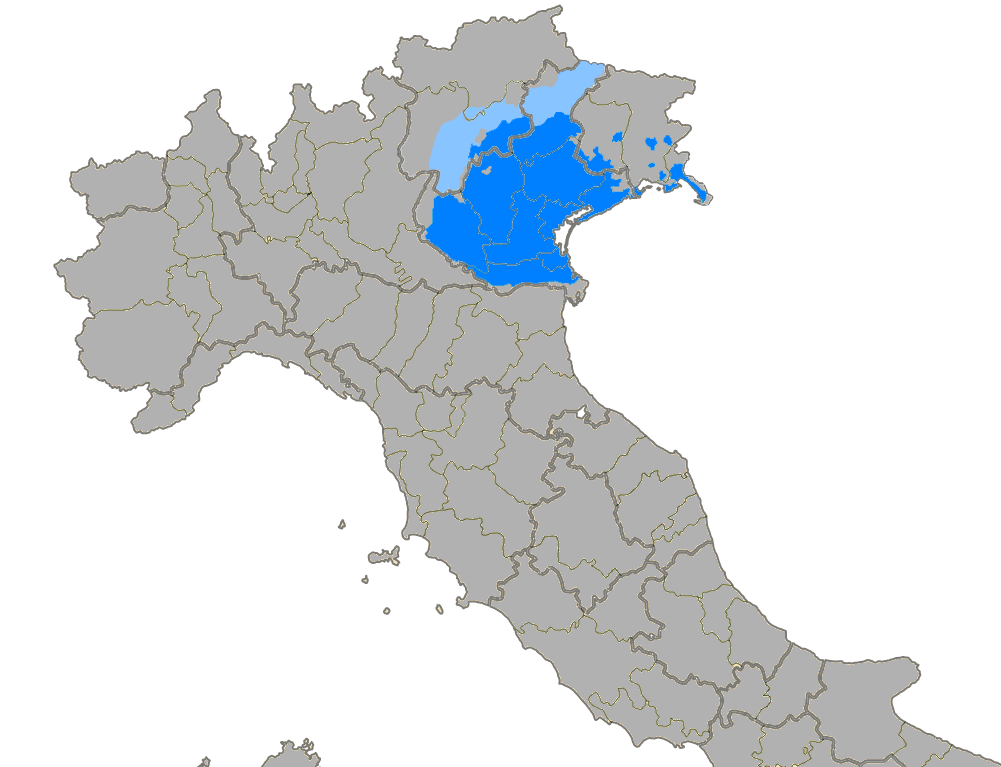
Venetian varieties

The Venetian language is sometimes added to Italo-Dalmatian when excluded from Gallo-Italic, and then usually grouped with Istriot. However, Venetian is not grouped into the Italo-Dalmatian languages by Ethnologue unlike Istriot, though Glottolog v5.3 groups Venetian into its Dalmatian Romance branch with Dalmatian and Istriot.

=== Tuscan and Corsican ===
- Tuscan-Corsican: group of dialects spoken in the Italian region of Tuscany, and the French island of Corsica.
  - Northern Tuscan dialects:
    - Florentine is spoken in the city of Florence, and was the basis for Standard Italian.
    - Other dialects: Pistoiese; Pesciatino or Valdinievolese; Lucchese; Versiliese; Viareggino; Pisano-Livornese.
  - Southern Tuscan dialects:
    - Dialects of Aretino-Chianaiolo, Senese, Grossetano.
  - Corsican, spoken on Corsica, is thought to be descended from Tuscan.
    - Gallurese and Sassarese, spoken on the northern tip of Sardinia, can be considered either dialects of Corsican or Corso-Sardinian transitional varieties.

=== Italian ===
Italian is an official language in Italy, Switzerland, San Marino, Vatican City and western Istria (in Slovenia and Croatia). It used to have official status in Albania, Malta and Monaco, where it is still widely spoken, as well as in former Italian East Africa and Italian North Africa regions where it plays a significant role in various sectors. Italian is also spoken by large expatriate communities in the Americas and Australia. The Italian language was initially and primarily based on Florentine: it has been then deeply influenced by almost all regional languages of Italy while its received pronunciation (known as Pronuncia Fiorentina Emendata, Amended Florentine Pronunciation) is based on the accent of the Roman dialect; these are the reasons why Italian differs significantly from Tuscan and its Florentine variety.

=== Central Italian ===
Central Italian, or in Italian linguistics "Median Italian", is spoken in the regions of Lazio, Umbria, Central Marche, and in small parts of Abruzzo and Tuscany. It is mainly split across the Roma-Ancona line, which divides the Central dialects into a Northwestern Perimedian group and a Southeastern Median one. Romanesco, the historical dialect of Rome, has lost most of its Central peculiarities and is not a regular part of Central, as it historically is the product of the implantation of Florentine on Old Romanesco, the ancient Median dialect which was spoken in Rome prior to the 1500s.

=== Neapolitan ===
The Neapolitan language, or known in Italian linguistics as the "intermediate southern dialect group", is spoken in: southern Marche; southernmost Lazio; Abruzzo; Molise; Campania (including Naples); Basilicata; and the north of both Apulia and Calabria.

- The Campano dialects of Neapolitan, Irpino, Southern Laziale: spoken in Naples and Campania; and southern Lazio.
- Abruzzese-Southern Marchigiano: spoken in the Abruzzo region and southern Marche region.
- Molisan: spoken in the Molise region.
- Basilicatine (Lucanian): spoken in the region of Basilicata, also known as Lucania.
- Pugliese or Apulian: spoken in the northern region of Apulia.
- Cosentino, also known as or Northern Calabrian: spoken in the Province of Cosenza, in northern Calabria.
- Vastese, spoken in the town of Vasto.

=== Extreme Southern Italian ===
- Extreme Southern Italian is spoken on the island of Sicily; in the south of both Calabria and Apulia; and in Cilento, in the southernmost of Campania.
  - Sicilian, spoken on the island of Sicily: Western Sicilian; Central Metafonetica; Southeast Metafonetica; Ennese; Eastern Nonmetafonetica; Messinese.
  - Sicilian dialects on other islands: Isole Eolie, on the Aeolian Islands; Pantesco, on the island of Pantelleria.
  - Calabro, or Central-Southern Calabrian: dialects are spoken in the central and southern areas of the region of Calabria.
  - Salentino, spoken in the Salento region of southern Apulia.
  - Southern Cilentan: spoken in Roccagloriosa and Rofrano in southern tip of Cilento, which is southern Province of Salerno, in the Campania region.
- Cilentan: spoken in Cilento, influenced by both Neapolitan language and Sicilian language.

=== Judeo-Italian ===
The Judeo-Italian dialects are varieties of Italian used by Jewish communities, between the 10th and the 20th centuries, in Italy and Greece (Corfu and Zakynthos).

== Western Romance languages ==
Based on mutual intelligibility, Dalby lists a dozen languages: Portuguese, Spanish, Asturian-Leonese, Aragonese, Catalan, Gascon, Provençal, Gallo-Wallon, Piedmontese, Ligurian, Lombard, French, Arpitan (or Franco-Provençal), Romansh, and Ladin.

=== Gallo-Romance ===
Gallo-Romance includes:

- The Langues d'oïl, or Oïl languages. These include Standard French, Picard, Walloon, Lorrain and Norman.
- The Arpitan language, also known as Franco-Provençal. It shares features of both French and the Provençal dialect of Occitan. Sometimes included in the Oïl languages.

Gallo-Romance can include:

- The Rhaeto-Romance languages. They include Romansh of Switzerland, Ladin of the Dolomites area, Friulian of Friuli. Rhaeto-Romance languages can be classified as Gallo-Romance, or as an independent branch of the Western Romance languages.
- The Occitano-Romance languages of Southern France and East Iberia, includes Occitan and Catalan. Occitano-Romance languages can be classified as Gallo-Romance, Iberian-Romance, or as an independent branch of the Western Romance languages.
  - The Occitan language, or langue d'oc, has dialects such as Provençal dialect, and Gascon-Aranese dialect.
  - The Catalan language has standard forms of Catalan and Valencian. Can be classified as East Iberian.
- The Gallo-Italic languages. They include Piedmontese, Ligurian, Lombard, Emiliano-Romagnolo, Gallo-Italic of Sicily and Gallo-Italic of Basilicata. Gallo-Italic languages can be classified as Gallo-Romance or as Northern Italian dialects. The Venetian language is sometimes included in Gallo-Italic, but it has several characteristics that set it apart from it.

The Oïl languages, Arpitan, Occitano-Romance and Rhaeto-Romance languages are sometimes called Gallo-Rhaetian.

=== Iberian-Romance ===
- The West Iberian languages:
  - The Castilian languages: includes Spanish and Judaeo-Spanish.
  - The Galician-Portuguese languages: includes Portuguese, Galician, and Fala.
  - The Astur-Leonese languages: they are, from east to west, Cantabrian, central-eastern Asturian and Leonese proper. Going from north to south, they are Leonese proper, Mirandese, and Extremaduran.
- The Pyrenean–Mozarabic languages: includes Aragonese, and the extinct Mozarabic. Can be classified as West Iberian.
- The East Iberian language, or Catalan language: usually classified as part of Occitano-Romance, see Gallo-Romance above.
