= Neolinguistics =

Anti-neogrammarian approach to diachronic linguistics

Neolinguistics is the term used to describe the approach to diachronic linguistics and dialectology founded by Matteo Bartoli as a reaction to the Neogrammarians. Along with the Neoidealists it was one of the main rivals of the Neogrammarians, until structuralism, which emerged from the Neogrammarian tradition, superseded it.

The neolinguists deemphasized the importance of tree structures in the relationship between languages, and emphasized the importance of variation, especially geographic variation.
