= Syntactic gemination =

Phonological doubling of initial consonants

Syntactic gemination, or syntactic doubling, is an external sandhi phenomenon in Italian, other Romance languages spoken in Italy, and Finnish. It consists in the lengthening (gemination) of the initial consonant in certain contexts. It may also be called word-initial gemination or phonosyntactic consonantal gemination.

In Italian it is called raddoppiamento sintattico (RS), raddoppiamento fonosintattico (RF), raddoppiamento iniziale, or rafforzamento iniziale (della consonante).

== Italian ==
"Syntactic" means that gemination spans word boundaries, as opposed to word-internal geminate consonants as in [ˈɡatto] "cat" or [ˈanno] "year". In standard Italian, syntactic doubling occurs after the following words (with exceptions described below):

- all stressed ("strong") monosyllables (monosillabi forti) and some unstressed ("weak") monosyllables (monosillabi deboli): a, blu, che, ché, chi, ciò, da, dà, dì, do, e, è, fa, fra, fu, già, giù, ha, ho, la (noun), là, lì, ma, me (stressed), mi (noun), né, o (conjunction), più, può, qua, qui, re, sa, se (conjunction), sé, si (noun), sì, so, sta, sto, su, sù, te (stressed), tè, tra, tre, tu, va, etc
  - Example: Andiamo a casa [anˈdjaːmo a‿kˈkaːsa], 'Let's go home'
- all polysyllables stressed on the final vowel (oxytones)
  - Example: Parigi è una città bellissima [paˈriːdʒi ɛ una tʃitˈta‿bbelˈlissima], 'Paris is a very beautiful city'
- a few paroxytones (words with stress on the second-last syllable) when they are not substantivized: come, dove (ove), qualche, sopra (sovra)
  - Example: Come va? [ˈkome‿vˈva], 'How are you?'

Articles, clitic pronouns (mi, ti, lo, etc.) and various particles do not cause doubling in standard Italian. Phonetic results such as occasional /il kane/ → [i‿kˈkaːne] 'the dog' in colloquial (typically Tuscan) speech are transparent cases of synchronic assimilation.

The cases of doubling are commonly classified as "stress-induced doubling" and "lexical".

Lexical syntactic doubling has been explained as a diachronic development, initiating as straightforward synchronic assimilation of word-final consonants to the initial consonant of the following word, subsequently reinterpreted as gemination prompts after terminal consonants were lost in the evolution from Latin to Italian (ad > a, et > e, etc.). Thus [kk] resulting from assimilation of /-d#k-/ in Latin ad casam in casual speech persists today as a casa with [kk], with no present-day clue of its origin or of why a casa has the geminate but la casa does not (illa, the source of la, had no final consonant to produce assimilation).

Stress-induced word-initial gemination conforms to phonetic structure of Italian syllables: stressed vowels in Italian are phonetically long in open syllables, short in syllables closed by a consonant; final stressed vowels are by nature short in Italian, thus attract lengthening of a following consonant to close the syllable. In città di mare 'seaside city', the stressed short final vowel of città thus produces [tʃitˈta‿ddi‿ˈmaːre].

In some phonemic transcriptions, such as in the Zingarelli dictionary, words that trigger syntactic gemination are marked with an asterisk: e.g. the preposition "a" is transcribed as /a*/.

=== Regional occurrence ===
Syntactic gemination is used in standard Italian and it is also the normal native pronunciation in Tuscany, excluding most of Arezzo province, central Italy (both stress-induced and lexical) and southern Italy (only lexical), including Sicily and Corsica. In northern Italy, San Marino and Switzerland speakers use it inconsistently because the feature is not present in the dialectal substratum, and it is not usually shown in the written language unless a single word is produced by the fusion of two constituent words: "chi sa"-> chissà ('who knows' in the sense of 'goodness knows'). It is not unusual to hear northern speakers pronounce geminates when present in established written forms, but not observe syntactic gemination if not written in an otherwise identical phonological sequence. Thus "chissà chi è stato" with [ss], meaning "who knows (I wonder) who did it" may contrast with "chi sa chi è stato?" with [s], meaning "who (of you) knows who did it?", whereas speakers from areas where chi is acquired naturally as a gemination trigger will have phonetic [ss] for both.

It is not normally taught in the grammar programmes of Italian schools so most speakers are not consciously aware of its existence. Those northern speakers who do not acquire it naturally often do not try to adopt the feature.

=== Exceptions ===
It does not occur in the following cases:

- A pause is at the boundary of words in question. In particular, initial gemination may be conditioned by syntax, which determines the likelihood of pause. For example, in the phrase La volpe ne aveva mangiato metà prima di addormentarsi ('The fox had eaten half of it before falling asleep'), there is no gemination after metà if there is even a slight pause, as prima is part of the adjunct, a sentence element that is easily isolated phonologically from the main clause within the prosodic hierarchy of the phrase.
- The stressed final vowel is lengthened.
- A sharp break or change occurs in the pitch on the word boundary.

There are other considerations, especially in various dialects, so that initial gemination is subject to complicated lexical, syntactic and phonological/prosodic conditions.

== Finnish ==
Boundary gemination, known in Finnish as rajageminaatio, loppukahdennus ("end doubling"), or alkukahdennus ("onset doubling"), is a phonological phenomenon in Finnish in which consonant sounds are doubled at the boundary of two words. The feature occurs primarily in spoken Finnish and is not reflected in written language. The phenomenon is also referred to as rajakahdennus ("boundary lengthening").

Boundary gemination is triggered by certain morphemes. If the morpheme boundary is followed by a consonant, it is doubled. If it is followed by a vowel, a long glottal stop is introduced. For example, mene pois is pronounced meneppois [menepːois], and mene ulos is pronounced [meneʔːulos]. Following Fred Karlsson (who called the phenomenon "initial doubling"), these triggering morphemes are called x-morphemes and marked with a superscript "x", e.g., "sade^{x}".

Boundary gemination appears in various grammatical contexts and may significantly affect the pronunciation of spoken Finnish. The following are the main contexts in which boundary gemination occurs:

- Imperative forms (when a singular imperative verb is followed by another word, the initial consonant of the following word is doubled)
  - Tule tänne! ("Come here!") → pronounced as tulettänne.
  - Mene pois! ("Go away!") → pronounced as meneppois.
- Infinitive verbs (the first infinitive form of verbs may trigger gemination in the following word)
  - Haluan ostaa koiran. ("I want to buy a dog.") → pronounced as haluan ostaakkoiran.
  - Nyt täytyy lähteä pois. ("Now we must leave.") → pronounced as nyt täytyy lähteäppois.
- Negative verb forms (boundary gemination is common in present-tense negative constructions)
  - En mene sinne. ("I am not going there.") → pronounced as en menessinne.
  - Älä ota kuvaa! ("Don’t take a picture!") → pronounced as älä otakkuvaa.
- Words ending in -e (many words ending in -e exhibit gemination when followed by another word)
  - Vene hajosi. ("The boat broke.") → pronounced as venehhajosi.
  - Sade jatkui pitkään. ("The rain continued for a long time.") → pronounced as sadejjatkui pitkään.
- Allative case (Nouns in the allative case may cause gemination in the following word)
  - Kerron lapsille sadun. ("I will tell the children a story.") → pronounced as kerron lapsillessadun.
  - Se oli meille tarkoitettu. ("It was meant for us.") → pronounced as se oli meillettarkoitettu.
- Possessive suffix (the third-person possessive suffix triggers gemination in certain cases)
  - Hän tuli äitinsä kanssa. ("He/she came with his/her mother.") → pronounced as hän tuli äitinsäkkanssa.
  - Hän käveli isänsä takana. ("He/she walked behind his/her father.") → pronounced as hän käveli isänsättakana.
- Certain adverbs (adverbs ending in -sti, -nne, -tse, -lti, and -i may trigger gemination)
  - Se tekee varmasti hyvää. ("It will surely do good.") → pronounced as se tekee varmastihhyvää.
  - Menen sinne kohta. ("I will go there soon.") → pronounced as menen sinnekkohta.
- Comitative case (in some dialects, the comitative case without a possessive suffix may lead to gemination)
  - Hän tuli molempine poikineen. ("He/she came with both his/her sons.") → pronounced as hän tuli molempineppoikineen.
- NUT-participle (in spoken Finnish, the past participle ending -nut/-nyt often drops the final -t, leading to gemination)
  - En tullut kokoukseen. ("I didn’t come to the meeting.") → pronounced as en tullukkokoukseen.

=== Historical context and regional occurrence ===
Boundary gemination in Finnish likely developed from historical phonological shifts, including the loss of final consonants in certain word forms, which led to the doubling of initial consonants in subsequent words. The process resembles modern spoken Finnish trends, where the dropping of final -t in the NUT-participle results in similar gemination effects.

Most notably, the Pori and Kymenlaakso dialects lack this feature. For example, tule tänne ("come here") may sound more like tuletänne, instead of the standard pronunciation, tulettänne.

== See also ==
- Aspirated h
- Consonant mutation
- Sandhi
- Liaison (French)
