= Latino-Faliscan languages =

Language family

Latino-Faliscan
- Latinian
- Geographic distribution: Originally Latium in Italy, then throughout the Roman Empire, especially in the western regions; now also throughout Latin America, Eastern Canada, and many countries in Africa
- Linguistic classification: Indo-European: Italic; Latino-Faliscan
- Proto-language: Proto-Latino-Faliscan
- Subdivisions: Latin (including Romance languages); Faliscan†; Lanuvian†; Praenestine†; Siculian?†

Language codes
- Glottolog: lati1262
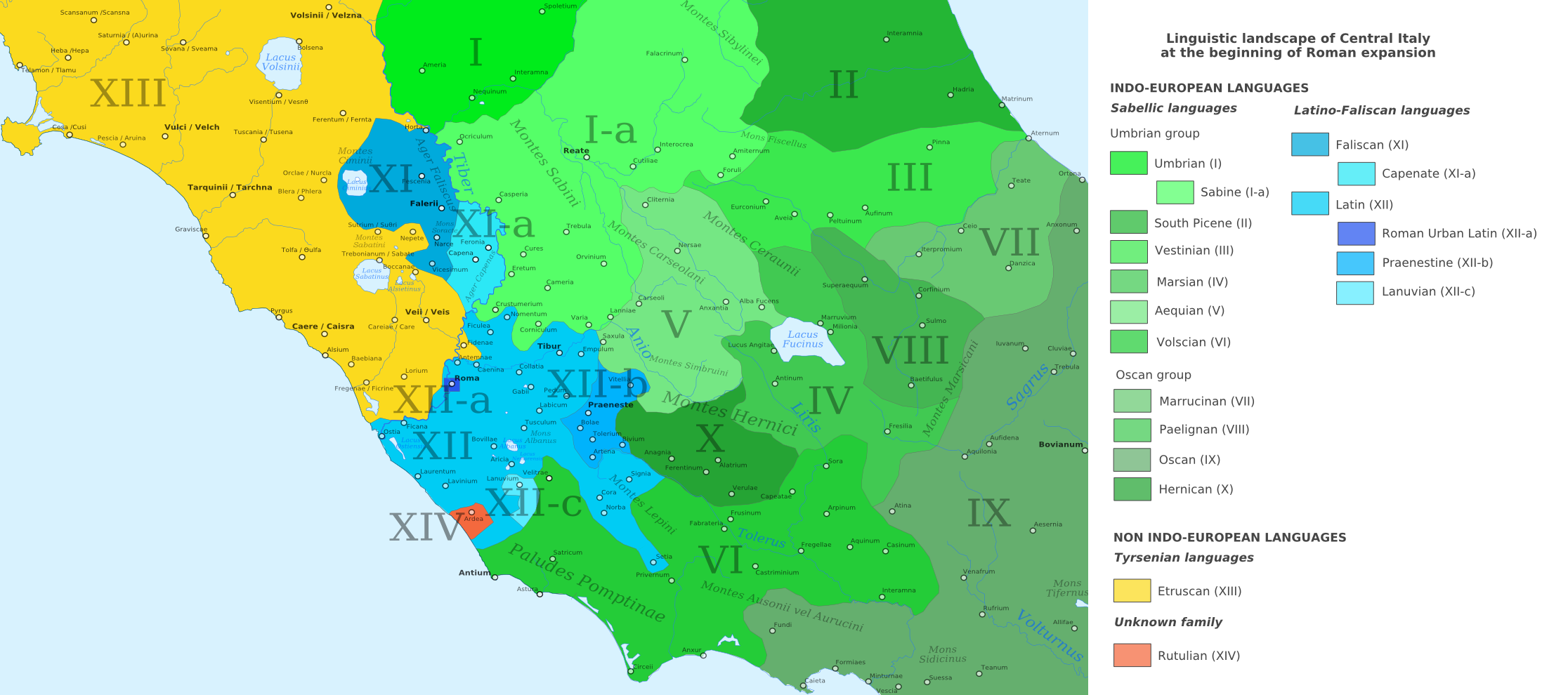
- Latino-Faliscan languages and dialects in different shades of blue.

Latino-Faliscan or Latinian languages were a branch of the Italic languages within the Indo-European family. They were spoken by the Latino-Faliscan people of Italy who lived there from the early 1st millennium BC.

Latin and Faliscan belong to the group, as well as Lanuvian and Praenestine, which are sometimes considered dialects of Latin.

== Linguistic description ==
Latin and Faliscan have several features in common with other Italic languages:

- The late Indo-European diphthong /*eu/ evolved into ou.
- The late Indo-European /*ə/ from vocalic laryngeals evolved into a.
- The Indo-European syllabic liquids /*l̥, *r̥/ developed an epenthetic vowel o, giving Italic ol, or.
- The Indo-European syllabic nasals /*m̥, *n̥/ developed an epenthetic vowel e, giving Italic em, en.
- Word-initial aspirated stops from Indo-European were fricativised: /*bʰ, *dʰ, *gʰ, gʷʰ/ > f, f, h, f.
- The sequence /*p...kʷ/ was assimilated into kʷ...kʷ (Proto-Indo-European *penkʷe 'five' > Latin quinque).

Latin and Faliscan also have characteristics not shared by other branches of Italic. They retain the Indo-European labiovelars /*kʷ, *gʷ/ as qu-, gu- (later becoming velar and semivocal), whereas in Osco-Umbrian they become labial p, b. Latin and Faliscan use the ablative suffix -d, seen in med ("me", ablative), which is absent in Osco-Umbrian. In addition, Latin displays evolution of ou into ū, though this happens later than the Latino-Faliscan era, occurring around the 2nd century BCE (Latin lūna < Proto-Italic *louksnā < PIE *lówksneh₂ "moon").

=== Phonology ===
It is likely that the consonant inventory of Proto-Latino-Faliscan was basically identical to that of archaic Latin. Consonants not found in the Praeneste fibula are marked with an asterisk.

		Labial	Alveolar	Palatal	Velar	Labio- velar	Glottal
Plosive	voiceless	*p	*t		k	*kʷ	
Plosive	voiced	*b	d		*g	*gʷ	
Fricative		f	s				*h
Sonorants			*r, *l	j		*w	
Nasal		m	n				

The /kʷ/ sound still existed in archaic Latin when the Latin alphabet was developed, since it gives rise to the minimal pair quī /kʷiː/ ("who", nominative) > cuī /ku.iː/ ("to whom", dative). In other positions there is no distinction between diphthongs and hiatuses: for example, persuādere ("to persuade") is a diphthong but sua ("his"/"her") is a hiatus. For reasons of symmetry, it is quite possible that many sequences of gu in archaic Latin in fact represent a voiced labiovelar /gʷ/.

== Lanuvian ==
Lanuvian was an archaic Latino-Faliscan language spoken by Latins who lived close to Rome. It may have been a dialect of Latin.

== Praenestine ==
Praenestine or Praenestinian was an archaic form of Latino-Faliscan spoken in eastern Old Latium (modern day Lazio), Italy.

== See also ==
- Italic peoples
