= Haplogroup T-M184 =

Human Y-chromosome DNA haplogroup

- Haplogroup T expansion across the world
- Possible time of origin: 26,000 BP
- Possible place of origin: West Asia
- Ancestor: LT
- Descendants: T1 (T-L206); T2 (T-PH110)
- Defining mutations: M184/PAGES34/USP9Y+3178, M272, PAGES129, L810, L455, L452, L445
- Highest frequencies: Somalis (Dir, Dire Dawa, Isaaq); Antemoro (Madagascar); Marchigianos (Italy); Kurru (India); Bauris (India), Lodhas (India)

Haplogroup T-M184, also known as Haplogroup T, is a human Y-chromosome DNA haplogroup. The unique-event polymorphism that defines this clade is the single-nucleotide polymorphism known as M184.

T-M184 is unusual in that it is both geographically widespread and relatively rare. T1 (T-L206) – the numerically dominant primary branch of T-M184 – appears to have originated in Western Asia, and spread from there into East Africa, South Asia, Europe, Egypt and adjoining regions. T1* may have expanded with the Pre-Pottery Neolithic B culture (PPNB) which originated in West Asia.

The earliest presence of T-M184 appears in Ain Ghazal, Jordan (sample i1707), bordering Asia and Africa. The individual predated the arrival of Caucaso-Iranian ancestry to the Levant. His DNA consisted of Natufian Hunter Gatherer and Anatolian Neolithic ancestry, together known as PPNB, which was the indigenous ancestry of the Levant at the time.

Subclades of T-M70 appear to have been present in Europe since the Neolithic with Neolithic Farmers from Western Asia. The moderately high frequency (~18%) of T1b* chromosomes in the Lemba of southern Africa supports the hypothesis of a West Asian origin for their paternal line.

== Structure ==
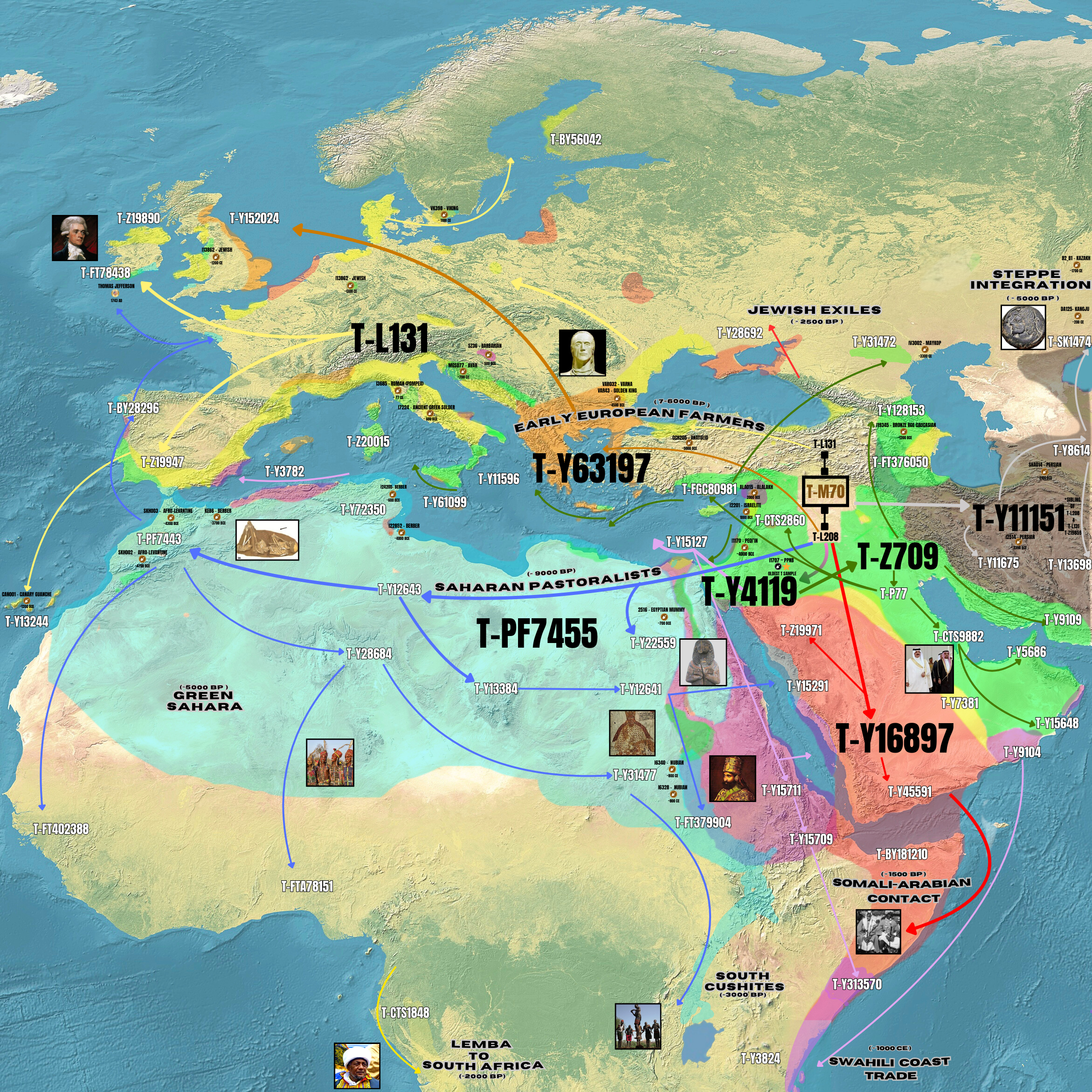
Haplogroup T expansion across Africa, Middle East and Europe

Subclade structure of Haplogroup T (M184).

- T1 (L206)
  - T1a (M70/Page46/PF5662)
    - T1a1 (L162/Page21, L454)
      - T1a1a (L208/Page2)
        - T1a1a1 (CTS11451)
        - T1a1a2 (Y16897)
          - T1a1a2a (Z19963)
    - T1a2 (L131)
      - T1a2a (PH141/Y13244)
      - T1a2b (L446)
    - T1a3 (FGC1350/Y11151 )
      - T1a3a (Y11675/Z9798)
      - T1a3b (FGC1340/Y8614)
- T2 (PH110)

== Distribution ==
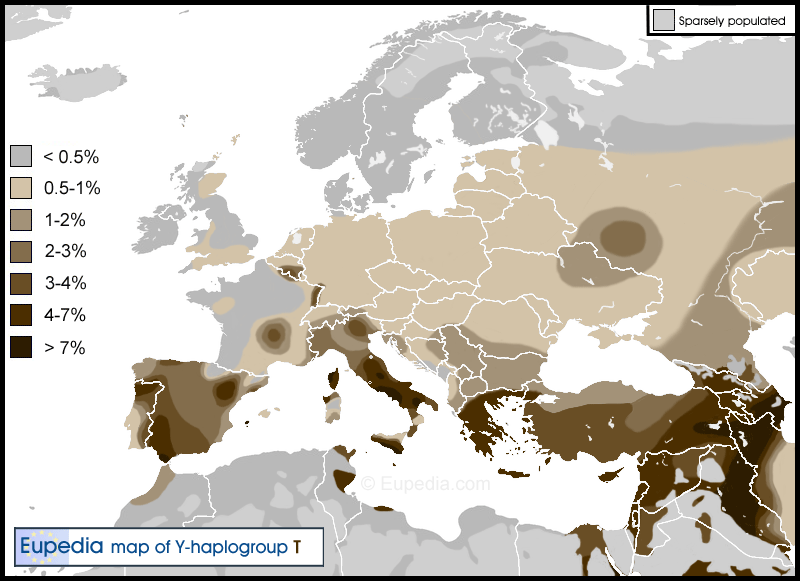
Detailed representation of the presence of Haplogroup T in Europe and surrounding areas.

=== Overview ===
As a primary branch of haplogroup LT (a.k.a. K1), the basal, undivergent haplogroup T* currently has the alternate phylogenetic name of K1b and is a sibling of haplogroup L* (a.k.a. K1a). (Before 2008, haplogroup T and its subclades were known as haplogroup K2. The name K2 has since been reassigned to a primary subclade of haplogroup K.) It has two primary branches: T1 (T-L206) and T2 (T-PH110). Most males who now belong to haplogroup T1* carry the subclade T-M70 (T1a), a primary branch of T-M206.

Haplogroup T is found at exceptionally high levels amongst the Dir and Isaaq in Somaliland, Djibouti, and Ethiopia. It is also found at relatively high levels in specific populations in other parts of the world which include Kurru, Bauris and Lodha in India; among Toubou in Chad; Somalilander clans: Isaaq and Dir, southern Egyptians and Fula (Fulbe) in north Cameroon; Zoroastrians, Bakhtiaris, Assyrians and Iraqi Jews in the Middle East. T is a rather rare haplogroup, displaying a global frequency of around 1% (King et al., 2007), but nonetheless it is found at quite high frequencies in Sephardic Levites (23%) and Sephardic Israelis (13%; Behar et al., 2004).

The maximal worldwide frequency for haplogroup T-M184 is 100%, amongst Dir clan males (Iacovacci et al. 2016). [6] It accounts for approximately 82.4% of ethnic Somali male lineages overall in Dire Dawa, Ethiopia (Plaster et al. 2011). T is only 9% in Somalia (Iacovacci et al. 2016). Geographically, it is found at the highest levels in the Dire Dawa area of Ethiopia, and Djibouti.

Luis et al. (2004) suggest that the presence of T on the African continent may, like R1* representatives, point to an older introduction from West Asia. The Levant rather than the Arabian Peninsula appears to have been the main route of entry, as the Egyptian and Anatolian haplotypes are considerably older in age (13,700 BP and 9,000 BP, respectively) than those found in Oman (only 1,600 BP). According to the authors, haplogroup T-M184 within Africa represents the traces of a more widespread early local presence of the West Asian clade. Later expansions of populations from West Asia carrying the E-M215, E-V38, G and J NRY lineages may have overwhelmed the T-M184 clade-bearers in certain localities.

Prevalence of T-M184 in Armenians from Sasun

T-M184, which is relatively rare in other Near Eastern populations, as well as in three ... Armenian collections tested here, represents the most prominent [patrilineal] descent in Sasun, comprising 20.1% of the samples. The presence of this haplogroup in Ararat Valley, Gardman and Lake Van, by contrast, is more limited, composing only 3.6%, 6.3% and 3.9%, respectively, of the individuals from those collections.[...] Sasun, however, exhibits statistically significant divergence from the remaining Armenian populations, most likely as the result of the prominence in Sasun of lineages (T-M184 and R2a-M124) found at substantially lower frequencies in Ararat Valley, Gardman and Lake Van.

— Kristian J Herrera, 2012

In the Caucasus and Anatolia it makes up to 4% of the population in southeast and northwest Caucasus as well as in southeast and western Anatolia, peaking up to 20% in Armenians from Sasun. In Middle East it makes up to 4% of the population around the Zagros Mountains and the Persian Gulf as well as around the Taurus Mountains and the Levant basin, peaking up to 10% in Zoroastrians from Kerman, Bakhtiaris, Assyrians (up to 40%), Abudhabians, Armenians from Historical Southwestern Armenia and Druzes from Galilee. In Eastern Africa, it makes up to 4% of the population on Upper Egypt peaking up to 10% in Luxor.

Haplogroup T is uncommon in Europe, except in Southern Europe and adjoining areas. According to Mendez et al. (2011), "the occurrence in Europe of lineages belonging to both T1a1 (old T1a) and T1a2 (old T1b) subclades probably reflects multiple episodes of gene flow. T1a1* haplogroups in Europe likely reflect older gene flow". It makes up to 4% of the population in Central Italy, Western Sicily, Northwest Corsica, Northwestern Iberian Peninsula, Western Andalucia, Western Alps, Eastern Crete, and Macedonia, frequencies up to 10% in Ibiza, Miranda do Douro, Eastern Oviedo, Cádiz, Badajoz, Balagna, Norma and Ragusa, and peaking at 20% in Sciacca, L'Aquila and some German southern regions. T-M184 was found in 1.7% (10/591) of a pool of six samples of males from southwestern Russia, but it was completely absent from a pool of eight samples totalling 637 individuals from the northern half of European Russia. The Russians from the southwest were from the following cities: Roslavl, Livny, Pristen, Repyevka, and Belgorod; and Kuban Cossacks from the Republic of Adygea.

=== T1 (T*) ===
Population	Language	Location	Sample size	Percentage	Source	Notes
Berbers	Siwi (Berber)	Sejenane	1/47	2.1%		
Syrians	Unspecified	Syria	1/95	1.1%		
Macedonians	Macedonian (Balto-Slavic)	Macedonia	1/201	0.5%		Macedonians Orthodox Christians

T1 is the most common descent of T-M184 haplogroup, being the lineage of more than 95% of all Eurasian T-M184 members. One of their descent lineages is found in high frequencies among northern Somali clans. However, it appears to have originated somewhere around the Eastern Mediterranean Basin, perhaps somewhere between Palestine to the Jordan Valley.

The basal T1* subclade appears to have spread to northeastern Anatolia, from the Levant and Mesopotamia at least, with the Pre-Pottery Neolithic B culture (PPNB). Although it is rare in modern populations, T1* has been found in a Berber individual from Tunisia, a male in Syria, and one sequence among ethnic Macedonians in Macedonia.

Initial research into T1a (T-M70; previously known as K2)

K2-M70 is believed to have originated in Western Asia after the emergence of the K-M9 polymorphism (45–30 ky) (Underhill et al. 2001a). As deduced from the collective data (Underhill et al. 2000; Cruciani et al. 2002; Semino et al. 2002; present study), K2-M70 individuals, at some later point, proceeded south to Africa. While these chromosomes are seen in relatively high frequencies in Egypt, Oman, Tanzania, Ethiopia, they are especially prominent in the Fulbe 18%( [Scozzari et al. 1997, 1999])

— J. R. Luis et al. 2004,

==== T1a (M70) ====
Mendez et al. (2011) points to an ancient presence for T1a-M70 in Europe may reflect early exiles between the ancient lands of Israel and Babylonia and Assyria. The subclade probably arrived with the very first farmers.

==== T1a1* ====
Pityusans: one of three genetically distinct populations in the Balearic Islands

The population of the Pityusic Islands does present a clear genetic divergence in relation to the Mallorcan and Menorcan populations. Neither shows a confluence with the Catalan and Valencian populations like do the Mallorcan and Menorcan. With the comparison of the data provided by the Pityusic population with other circumediterranean populations surprises that practically there is no convergence with any of these populations, not even with the North African populations. The Pityusic case is paradigmatic: for some markers shows affinities with Oriental populations (some mtDNA variables), but diverges from these populations when considering other markers. It is a separate case, an island, not in the geographical sense but genetical.

— Misericòrdia Ramon Juanpere et al., 1998-2004

The Pityusans of the Pityusic Islands (Ibiza and Formentera) – have been found by three different studies to possess T1a1 at relatively high levels of 6.7–16.7%. Tomàs et al. (2006) found three cases amongst a sample of 45 (6.7%). Zalloua et al. (2008) found nine examples that were L454+ (an SNP equivalent to L162/Page21) from a sample of 54 (i.e. a rate of 16.7%). Rodriguez et al. (2009) found seven cases of L454+ in a sample of 96 (7.3%).

The Pontic Greeks of Anatolia are also reported to possess T1a1. In 2009, a male with the surname Metaxopoulos and a Pontic Greek background was reported to be T-L162(xL208) – according to the Y-Chromosome Genome Comparison Project administered by Adriano Squecco. Greeks from the Fatsa (originally "Φάτσα") reportedly migrated in antiquity from Sinope, which was itself colonised by Ionians (from Miletus). Another ancient Ionian colony in north-west Anatolia, Lámpsakos (Lampsacus), had onomastic links to the Pityusic Islands (see above) – Lámpsakos was originally an Ionian colony known as Pityussa.

==== T1a1a (L208) ====
This lineage, formed 14,200-11,000 BP, is the largest branch downstream T1a1-L162. The Isaaq clans and dir is T-L208, they found in Somaliland, Djibouti, Somalia and Somali Ethiopia.

==== T1a1a1a1b1a1* (T-Y3782*) ====
One Sardinian male from a sample of 187 (a nominal rate of 0.53%) – a resident of the Province of Cagliari (Sardinian: Casteddu) – has been found to have T-Y3782(xY3836), also known T1a1a1a1b1a1(xT1a1a1a1b1a1a).

==== T1a1a1a1b1a1a (T-Y3836) ====
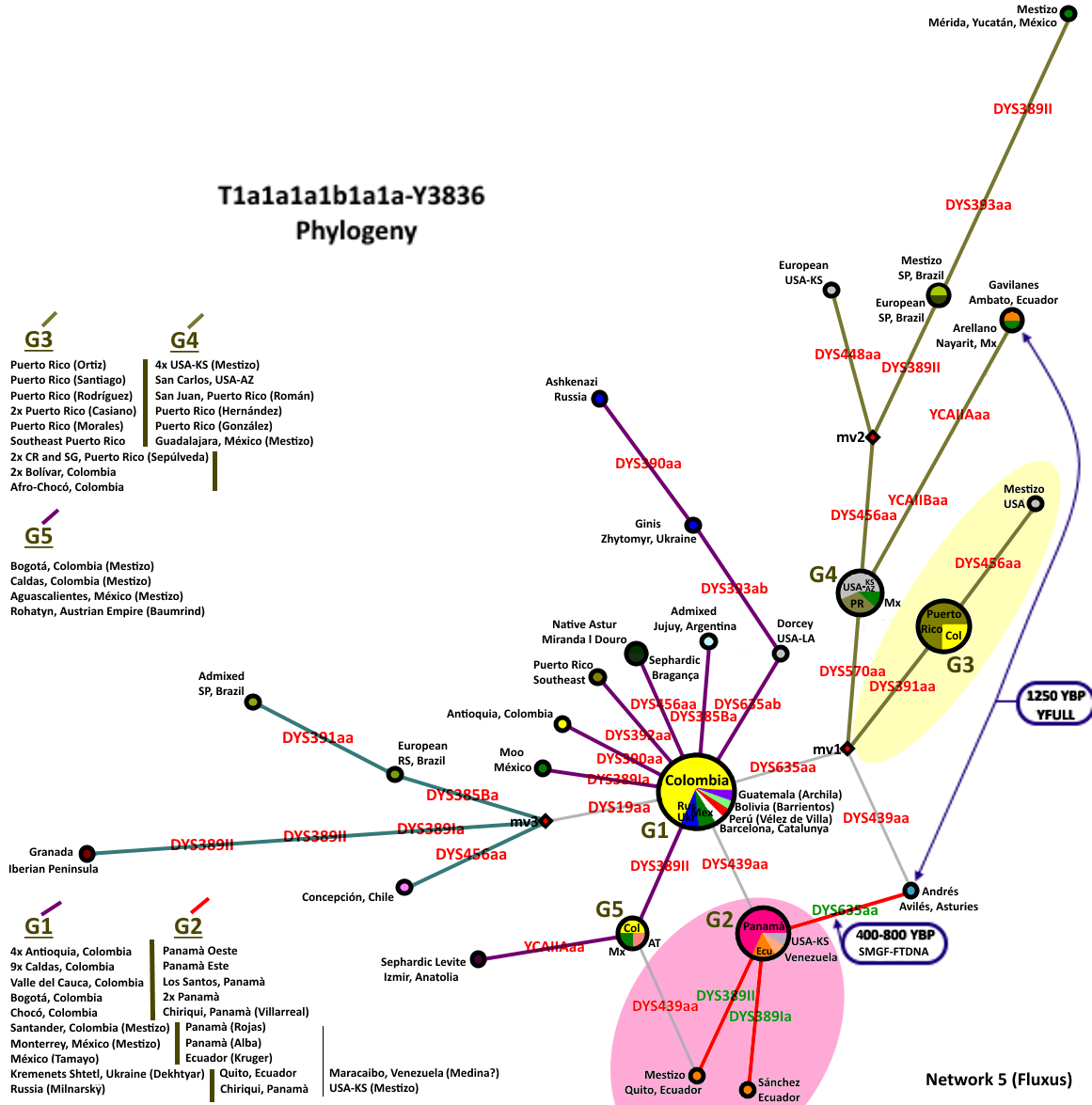
T-Y3836 Phylogeny. Using 19 Y-STR markers.

This lineage is mostly found among individuals from the Iberian Peninsula, where the subclade also has its highest diversity. Two subclades can be clearly discriminated. The first, found mainly in post-colonial Puerto Rico, with DYS391=10 and the second, found mainly in Panamá where their Iberian descendants could have the entrance point to America, with DYS439=12.

Some members of Y3836 are found among different communities of the Sephardic diaspora but they are found to be extremely rare in the total percentage of some of these communities as seen in Nogueiro et al. This probably could mean that these members could be integrated by these communities through the contact with other native Iberian populations as seen in Monteiro et al. where this lineage was found among native Astur-Leonese speakers.

Population	Language	Location	Members/Sample size	Percentage	Source	Notes
Panamanians	Panamian Castilian (Romance languages)	Los Santos Province	1/30	3.3%		
Colombians	Colombian Castilian (Romance languages)	Caldas	2/75	2.7%	YHRD	Mestizo individuals
Panamanians	Panamian Castilian (Romance languages)	Panama Province	1/43	2.3%		
Northwest Argentinians	Argentinian Castilian (Romance languages)	Mountainous region of Jujuy	1/50	2%	YHRD	Admixed population
Puerto Ricans	Puerto Rican Castilian (Romance languages)	Southeast Puerto Rico	2/110	1.8%		
Northeastern Portuguese Jews	Judaeo-Portuguese (Romance)	Bragança, Argozelo, Carção, Mogadouro, and Vilarinho dos Galegos	1/57	1.8%		
Native Mirandese speakers	Mirandese Astur-Leonese (Romance)	Miranda de l Douro	1/58	1.7%		
Dominicans	Dominican Castilian (Romance languages)	Dominican Republic	4/261	1.5%		
Panamanians	Panamian Castilian (Romance languages)	Chiriquí Province	1/92	1.1%		
Mecklenburgers	East Low Saxon (West Germanic)	Rostock	2/200	1%		
Mestizos	Colombian Castilian (Romance languages)	Bogotá	2/195	1%	YHRD	
Mestizos	Colombian Castilian (Romance languages)	Valle del Cauca	1/103	1%	YHRD	
Mestizos	Ecuadorian Castilian (Romance languages)	Quito	1/102	1%		
Venezuelans	Venezuelan Castilian (Romance languages)	Maracaibo	1/111	0.9%		
Venezuelans	Venezuelan Castilian (Romance languages)	Central Region	1/115	0.9%		
Europeans	Brazilian Portuguese (Romance languages)	São Paulo	1/120	0.8	YHRD	European descents
Ecuadorians	Ecuadorian Castilian (Romance languages)	Quito	1/120	0.8%		
Colombians	Colombian Castilian (Romance languages)	Antioquia	6/777	0.7%		
Mexicans	Mexican Castilian (Romance languages)	Mérida	1/159	0.6%	YHRD	Mestizo individuals
Eastern Andalusians	Andalusian (Romance)	Alhama de Granada, Baza, Huéscar, Loja, Montefrío and Órgiva	1/180	0.6%		
Colombians	Colombian Castilian (Romance languages)	Santander	1/193	0.5%	YHRD	Mestizo individuals
Chileans	Chilean Castilian (Romance languages)	Concepción	1/198	0.5%	YHRD	
Catalans	Not reported	Metropolitan area of Barcelona	1/224	0.5%		
Mexicans	Mexican Spanish (Romance languages)	Guadalajara	1/246	0.4%	YHRD	Mestizo individuals
Europeans	Brazilian Portuguese (Romance languages)	Rio Grande do Sul	1/255	0.4%		

=== T2 (PH110) ===
This lineage could have arrived in the Levant through the PPNB expansion from northeastern Anatolia.

A 2014 study found T-PH110 in one ethnic Bhutanese male, out of a sample of 21, possibly implying a rate of 4.8% in Bhutan. Also have been found in a German individual and another two from Caucasus. The Bhutanese and the German haplotypes seems to cluster together.

=== Possible cases from older research ===
Population	Language	Location	Members/Sample size	Percentage	Source	Notes
Altaians	Altai (Turkic)	Kurmach-Baygol	2/11	18.2%		K* (xT1a-M70, L-M20, N-DYF155S2, O-M175, P-92R7)
Altaians	Altai (Turkic)	Turochak	2/19	10.5%		K(xT1a-M70, L-M20, N-DYF155S2, O-M175, P-92R7)
Leoneses	Astur-Leonese (Romance)	Leon	1/13	7.7%		K(xT1a-M70, L1-M22, P-92R7)
Ossetian Irons	Iron (Iranian)	South Ossetia	1/21	4.8%		No further details available.
Cordobeses	Andalusian (Romance)	Córdoba	1/27	3.7%		No further details available.
Leoneses	Astur-Leonese (Romance)	Leon	2/60	3.3%		No further details available.
Tharus	Tharu (Indo-Aryan)	Morang	1/37	2.7%		K(xT1a-M70, L-M20, NO-M214, P-M74)
Cherkessians	Besleney (Northwest Caucasian)	Circassia	2/126	1.6%		No further details are available.
Bizkaians	Bizkaiera (Isolate language)	Bizkaia	1/72	1.4%		No further details are available.
Europeans	English (Germanic)	Australia	1/1078	0.09%		No further details are available.

== Modern geographical distribution ==
=== Northern Asia ===
Population	Language	Location	Members/Sample size	Percentage	Source	Notes
Kazakhs	Kazakh (Turkic)	Southwestern Altai	1/30	3.3%		T1a-M70
Evens	Even (Tungusic)	eastern Siberia	1/61	1.6%		
Barghuts	Barga (Mongolic)	different localities of Hulun Buir Aimak	1/76	1.3%		T1a-M70. In the 12–13th centuries, the Barga (Barghuts) Mongols appeared as tribes near Lake Baikal, named Bargujin.

=== Europe ===
Population	Language	Location	Members/Sample size	Percentage	Source	Notes
Marchigianos	Marchigiano dialect (Italian)	Arquata del Tronto and Apiro	2/2	100%		
Cretans and southern Aegeans	Southeastern Greek	Crete and southern Aegean	2/6	33.3%		
Rural Saccensi	Sicilian (Romance)	Sciacca	6/20	30%		
Chians	Southeastern Greek	Khíos	4/16	25%		
Stilfser (Tyrolese)	Southern Austro-Bavarian (German)	Stilfs, South Tyrol, Italy	4/17	23.5%		
Sephardic Levites			7/31	22.6%		Among Ashkenazi Levites found at 3.3% but different haplotype.
Venetians	Venetian (Romance)	Vigasio and Povegliano Veronese	2/9	22.2%		
Abruzzesi	Neapolitan language (Romance)	L'Aquila	6/30	20%		macro-haplogroup LT is 30% in L'Aquila population. This was the land of Samnium inhabited by the Caraceni
Cretans	Cretan Greek	Lasithi	9/50	18%		According to Martinez2007 only can belong to T1a-M70
Sicilians	Sicilian (Romance)	Sciacca	5/28	17.9%		
Urban Ragusani	Sicilian (Romance)	Ragusa	3/19	15.8%		
Northeastern Portuguese Jews	Judaeo-Portuguese (Romance)	Bragança, Argozelo, Carção, Mogadouro, and Vilarinho dos Galegos	9/57	15.7%		T have been found to be the second largest lineage in the Mirandês speaking population of Miranda do Douro too. Haplogroup T was not found in a sample of Belmonte Jews.
Albanians	Albanian	Brescia (Lombardia)	12/83	14.5%		The haplogroup tested is K*(xNOP), is assumed as LT and most probably are members of T
Rural Normensi	Italian (Romance)	Norma	1/7	14.3%		
Corsicans	Corsican (Romance)	Balagne (region of Corsica suprana)	3/24	12.5%		
Rural Piazzesi	Sicilian (Romance)	Piazza Armerina	3/24	12.5%		
Frosinonensis	Central Italian language (Romance)	Filettino	2/17	11.8%		Isolated mountain community
Vellepetrianis	Central Italian language (Romance)	Vallepietra	2/18	11.1%		Isolated mountain community
Cantabrians	Astur-Leonese (Romance)	Cantabria	2/18	11.1%		All individuals were interviewed in order to assess the geographical origin of their grandparents and their speaking dialect.
Marchigianos	Marchigiano (Romance)	Matelica	1/9	11.1%		
Gaditanos	Andalusian (Romance)	Cádiz	3/28	10.7%		
Native Mirandese speakers	Astur-Leonese (Romance)	Miranda de l Douro	6/58	10.4%		
Pacenses	Astur-Leonese (Romance)	Badajoz	3/29	10.3%		
Asturianos	Astur-Leonese (Romance)	Eastern Uviéu	1/10	10%		
Murcianos	Murcian (Romance)	Murcia	1/10	10%		
Aquilanis	Neapolitan language (Romance)	Cappadocia	5/54	9.3%		Isolated mountain community
Rural Alcamesi	Sicilian (Romance)	Alcamo	2/22	9.1%		
Cretans	Cretan Greek	Lasithi	2/23	8.7%		
Ligurians and Tuscans	Ligurian (Romance)	La Spezia / Massa	2/24	8.3%		
Lugueses	Galician language (Romance)	Lugo	1/12	8.3%		
Campanians	Neapolitan language (Romance)	West Campania	7/84	8.3%		
Campanians	Neapolitan language (Romance)	Cilento	4/48	8.3%		
Sicilians	Sicilian (Romance)	Alcamo	2/24	8.3%		
Lebaniegos	Astur-Leonese (Romance)	Liébana	3/37	8.1%		
Corsicans	Corsican (Romance)	Corte (region of Corsica suprana)	5/62	8.1%		
Segovianos	Castilian language (Romance)	Segovia	2/25	8%		
Marchigianos	Marchigiano (Romance)	Offida	3/38	7.9%		
Sicilians	Sicilian (Romance)	East Sicily	9/114	7.9%		
Saracinescanis	Central Italian language (Romance)	Saracinesco	2/18	7.7%		Isolated mountain community
Croats	Croatian (West Slavic)	Mljet Island	3/39	7.7%		
Northern Portugueses	Portuguese (Romance)	Vila Real	3/39	7.7%		
Materanis	Neapolitan language (Romance)	Matera and Policoro	4/52	7.7%		
Campanians	Neapolitan language (Romance)	Campania	8/108	7.4%		
Cretans	Cretan Greek	Oropedio Lasithiou	3/41	7.3%		
Latinensis	Neapolitan language (Romance) (Romance)	Norma and Sezze	3/41	7.3%		
Sicilians	Sicilian (Romance)	Ragusa	2/28	7.1%		
Sicilians	Sicilian (Romance)	Piazza Armerina	2/28	7.1%		
Sicilians	Sicilian (Romance)	Trapani	3/43	7%		
Ligurians	Ligurian (Romance)	La Spezia	3/43	7%		
Leccesis	Salentino language (Romance)	Vaste and Ugento	3/46	6.5%		
Walloons	Walloon (Romance)	Wallonia	3/47	6.4%		
Ascolanis	Marchigiano (Romance)	Offida and Ascoli Piceno	3/47	6.4%		
Asturianos	Eonavian (Romance)	Navia-Eo	2/31	6.5%		
Gagauzes	Gagauz (Turkic)	Kongaz	3/48	6.3%		
Solàndris	Solànder (Rhaeto-Romance)	Val de Sól	4/65	6.2%		
Northern Portuguese	Portuguese (Romance)	Aveiro	4/66	6.1%		
Western Andalusians	Andalusian (Romance)	Huelva	10/167	6%		
Aragonese	Aragonese and Castilian (Romance)	Aragón	2/34	5.9%		
Corsicans	Corsican	Corsica	2/34	5.9%		
Panteschis	Sicilian with Siculo-Arabic influences (Romance)	Pantelleria	1/17	5.9%		
Extremadurans	Astur-Leonese and Castilian (Romance)	Extremadura	3/52	5.8%		
Bulgarians	Bulgarian language (South Slavic languages)	Unspecified Bulgarian region	4/69	5.8%		
Tuscans	Tuscan (Romance)	Tuscany	3/53	5.7%		
Dutch	Hollandic (West Germanic)	North Holland	1/18	5.6%		
Lombardians	Lombard and Italian (Romance)	Lombardia	1/18	5.6%		
Sicilians	Sicilian (Romance)	Mazara del Vallo	1/18	5.6%		
Southern Italians	Italian (Romance)	South Apulia	4/71	5.6%		
Asturians	Astur-Leonese (Romance)	Asturies	4/74	5.4%		
Sicilians	Sicilian (Romance)	South Sicily	3/55	5.4%		
Lombardians	Lombard and Italian (Romance)	Lombardia	7/131	5.3%		
Hutterites	Austro-Bavarian (Upper German)	South Tyrol	4/75	5.3%		
Peloponnesians	Southern Greek	Peloponnese	1/19	5.3%		
Gutes	Gutnish (North Germanic)	Gotland	2/40	5%		
Alsatians	Alsatian (Upper German)	Strossburi	4/80	5%		
Asturians	Astur-Leonese (Romance)	Asturies	1/20	5%		
Italian speakers	Italian (Romance)	Bozen	3/59	5%		
Ladin Stilfser/Tyrolese	Ladin (Romance)	Stelvio	1/20	5%		
Gaditanos	Andalusian language (Romance)	Cádiz	1/20	5%		
Malacitanos	Andalusian language (Romance)	Málaga	1/20	5%		
Macedonians and Thracians	Northern Greek	East Macedonia and Thrace	1/21	4.8%		
Bulgarians	Bulgarian language (South Slavic languages)	Razgrad	1/21	4.8%		
Northeastern Portuguese	Portuguese (Romance)	Trás os Montes	3/64	4.7%		
Corsicans	Gallurese (Romance languages)	Tempiu	4/86	4.7%		
Sardinians	Sassarese (Romance)	Sassari	2/43	4.7%		
Jennesis	Central Italian language (Romance)	Jenne	3/65	4.6%		Isolated mountain community
Aretuseis	Sicilian (Romance)	Buccheri	1/22	4.6%		
Casteddammaresis	Sicilian (Romance)	Casteddammari	1/22	4.6%		
Sicilians	Sicilian (Romance)	East Sicily	4/87	4.6%		
Western Andalusians	Andalusian (Romance)	Huelva	1/22	4.5%		
West Andalusians	Andalusian (Romance)	Sevilla	7/155	4.5%		
Galicians	Galician (Romance)	Santiago	2/46	4.4%		
Palentinos	Castilian language (Romance)	Palencia	1/23	4.4%		
Catalans	Catalan (Romance)	Aragó	1/23	4.4%		
Ligurians	Ligurian (Romance)	Central Liguria	2/45	4.4%		
Catalans	Catalan (Romance)	Penedès	7/164	4.3%		
Greeks	Greek	Athens	4/92	4.3%		
Northern Portuguese	Portuguese	Beira Litoral	5/116	4.3%		
Ligurians	Ligurian (Romance)	La Spezia	2/46	4.3%		
South Italians	Salentino (Romance)	North Apulia	2/46	4.3%		
Cantabrians	Astur-Leonese (Romance)	Cantabria	3/70	4.3%		
Cimbrians	Cimbrian (West Germanic languages)	Lessinia	1/24	4.2%		
Pincianos	Castilian language (Romance)	Valladolid	1/24	4.2%		
Croats	Croatian (West Slavic)	Zadar Hinterland	1/25	4%		
Macedonians	Northern Greek	Central Macedonia	1/25	4%		
Madrileños	Castilian language (Romance)	Madrid	2/50	4%		
Germans	German (West Germanic)	Berlin	4/103	3.9%		
Northern Portuguese	Portuguese (Romance)	Braga	2/51	3.9%		
Beneventanis	Neapolitan language (Romance)	San Giorgio la Molara	1/26	3.9%		
Tuscans	Tuscan (Romance)	South Tuscany	3/79	3.8%		
Riojans	Riojan and Castilian (Romance)	La Rioja	2/54	3.7%		
Marchigianos	Marchigiano (Romance)	Apennines Marche	1/27	3.7%		
Calabrians	Southern Italian (Romance)	West Calabria	1/27	3.7%		
Urban Biellesi	Piedmontese (Romance)	Bièla	3/81	3.7%		
Ukrainians	Ukrainian (East Slavic)	Kharkiv Oblast	2/55	3.6%		
Native Sayaguese speakers	Astur-Leonese (Romance)	Sayago	1/28	3.6%		
Galicians	Galician (Romance)	Montes Baixo Miño	1/28	3.6%		
Corsicans	Corsican (Romance)	Ajaccio (region of Corsica sutana)	1/28	3.6%		
Sardinians	Sardinian (Romance)	Sassari and Orgosolo	2/56	3.6%		
Southern Portugueses	Portuguese (Romance)	Évora	1/29	3.5%		
Cretans	Cretan Greek	Khania	1/29	3.5%		
Canarians	Canarian Spanish (Romance)	La Palma	3/85	3.5%		
Scanians	Scanian dialects (South Scandinavian)	Malmö	1/29	3.4%		
Auvergnats	Auvergnat (Romance)	Clermont-Ferrand	3/89	3.4%		
Azoreans	Portuguese (Romance)	Eastern Azores	3/87	3.4%		
Asturians	Astur-Leonese (Romance)	Uviéu	6/182	3.3%		
Galicians	Galician (Romance)	Lugo	2/61	3.3%		
Albanians	Albanian dialects	Albania	1/30	3.3%		
Northeastern Portuguese	Portuguese (Romance)	Bragança	1/30	3.3%		
Northern Portuguese	Portuguese (Romance)	Viseu	1/30	3.3%		
Northern Portuguese	Portuguese (Romance)	Guarda	1/30	3.3%		
Catanzaresis	southern Calabrese (Romance)	Catanzaro	1/30	3.3%		
Sicilians	Sicilian (Romance)	West Sicily	4/122	3.3%		
Leoneses	Astur-leonese language (Romance)	Leon	7/221	3.2%		
Lithuanians	Aukštaitian (Baltic)	West Aukstaiciai	1/31	3.2%		
Euboeans	Thessalian (Hellenic)	Euboea	3/93	3.2%		
Greeks	Northern Greek	Western Greece	1/31	3.2%		
Campanians	Neapolitan language (Romance)	San Giorgio La Molara	1/31	3.2%		
Valencians	Catalan and Castilian (Romance)	Valencia	1/31	3.2%		
Southern Tyroleans	Southern Austro-Bavarian (Upper German)	Lower Vinschgau	1/32	3.1%		
Rhinelanders	Ripuarian (Central Franconian)	Köln	3/96	3.1%		
Swedes	Swedish dialects (East Scandinavian)	Örebro	1/32	3.1%		
Cantabrians	Astur-Leonese (Romance)	Cantabria	3/98	3.1%		
Albaceteño	Castilian language (Romance)	Albacete	1/32	3.1%		
Portuguese	Portuguese (Romance)	Madeira	4/129	3.1%		
Asturianos	Astur-Leonese language (Romance)	Asturias	1/33	3%		
Lentinesi	Sicilian (Romance)	Lentini	1/33	3%		
Shetlanders with Aboriginal surnames	Scots language and Norn Language (Germanic)	Shetland	1/35	2.9%		Shetland Project
Aretuseis	Sicilian (Romance)	Siracusa	4/138	2.9%		
Baslers	Basel German (West Germanic)	Basel-Stadt	18/643	2.8%		
Russians	Russian (East Slavic)	Smolensk Oblast	3/107	2.8%		
Gienenses	Castilian language (Romance)	Jaen	1/36	2.8%		
Native Alistano speakers	Astur-Leonese (Romance)	Aliste	1/36	2.8%		
Germans	German (Germanic)	Germany	1/37	2.7%		Karafet15
Russians	Russian (East Slavic)	Oryol Oblast	3/110	2.7%		
Macedonians	Macedonian (Balto-Slavic)	Macedonia	4/150	2.7%		
Azoreans	Portuguese (Romance)	Central Azores	2/76	2.6%		
Augustanis	Sicilian (Romance)	Augusta	1/38	2.6%		
Czechs	Czech (West Slavic)	Vysočina Region	1/40	2.5%		
Fiemmeses	Fiamazzo (Romance)	Val de Fiem	1/41	2.4%		
Flemish	Dutch (West Germanic)	Turnhout	1/42	2.4%		"1675" data set
Russians	Russian (East Slavic)	Oryol Oblast	1/42	2.4%		
Bulgarians	Bulgarian language (South Slavic languages)	Haskovo	1/41	2.4%		
Genoese Tabarkini	Ligurian (Romance languages)	U Pàize	1/41	2.4%		
Genoese Tabarkini	Ligurian (Romance languages)	U Pàize	1/48	2.1%		
Flemish	Dutch (West Germanic)	Tongeren	1/43	2.3%		T1a1a-L208
Sardinians	Sardinian, Corsican (Romance)	Sardinia	28/1204	2.3%		
Croats	Croatian (West Slavic)	Dubrovnik	4/179	2.2%		
Russians	Russian (East Slavic)	Kursk Oblast	1/45	2.2%		
Sardinians	Gallurese (Romance)	Gaddùra	1/46	2.2%		
Sardinians	Sardinian (Romance)	Sardinia	27/1204	2.2%		
Belvederesi	Neapolitan language (Romance)	Belvedere Marittimo	1/45	2.2%		
Fascians	Fascian (Rhaeto-Romance)	Fascia	1/47	2.1%		
Russians	Russian (East Slavic)	Lipetsk Oblast	1/47	2.1%		
Ukrainians	Ukrainian (East Slavic)	Chernihiv Raion	2/96	2.1%		
Sardinians	Campidanese (Romance)	Trexenta	1/47	2.1%		
Sardinians	Logudorese (Romance languages)	Benetuti	1/48	2.1%		
Lithuanians	Aukštaitian (Baltic)	western Aukštaitija	1/50	2%		
Ukrainians	Ukrainian (East Slavic)	Sumy Oblast	2/101	2%		
Zamoranos	Castilian (Romance)	Campos - Pan	1/50	2%		
Southwestern Almerians	Andalusian (Romance)	Laujar de Andarax, Ohanes, Berja and Adra	1/50	2%		
Alpujarreños	Andalusian (Romance)	Alpujarra de la Sierra	1/50	2%		
Corinthians	Ionian-Peloponesian and Albanian (Hellenic)	Corinthia	2/104	1.9%		
Macedonians	Macedonian (Balto-Slavic)	Macedonia	4/211	1.9%		
Sardinians	Campidanese (Romance languages)	Sòrgono	2/103	1.9%		
Catalans	Catalan language (Romance language)	Camp de Tarragona	4/214	1.9%		
Ukrainians	Ukrainian (East Slavic)	Cherkasy Raion	2/114	1.8%		
Adigeses	Italian (Romance)	Val d'Adige	1/56	1.8%		
Bosch surname members	Catalan language (Romance language)	Països Catalans	1/56	1.8%		
Basques	Gipuzkoan (Isolate language)	Southwestern Gipuzkoa	1/57	1.8%		
Basques	Gipuzkoan (Isolate language)	Gipuzkoa	1/58	1.7%		
Flemish	Dutch (West Germanic)	North Brabant	2/119	1.7%		"1775" data set
Bulgarians	Bulgarian language (South Slavic languages)	Sofia	1/59	1.7%		
Bulgarians	Bulgarian language (South Slavic languages)	Lovech	1/62	1.6%		
Balearics	Majorcan (Romance)	Mallorca	2/129	1.6%		
Czechs	Czech (West Slavic)	Plzeň	1/62	1.6%		
Mecklenburgers	East Low Saxon (West Germanic)	Rostock	3/200	1.5%		
Russians	Russian (East Slavic)	Belgorod Oblast	2/143	1.4%		
Catalans	Catalan (Romance)	Castelló	2/146	1.4%		
Bulgarians	Bulgarian language (South Slavic languages)	Plovdiv	2/159	1.3%		
Bulgarians	Bulgarian language (South Slavic languages)	Montana, Bulgaria	1/80	1.3%		
Catalans	Catalan (Romance)	Central Catalonia	3/230	1.3%		
Catalans	Catalan (Romance)	Barcelona	3/231	1.3%		
Catalans	Catalan (Romance)	Barcelona Periphery	3/235	1.3%		
Belarusians	Ukrainian (East Slavic)	Eastern Belarus	1/86	1.2%		
Czechs	Czech (West Slavic)	Ústí nad Labem	1/86	1.2%		
Russians	Russian (East Slavic)	Penza Oblast	1/81	1.2%		
Faroese	Faroese (Germanic)	Faroe Islands	1/89	1.1%		Grandfathers originated from various Faroese islands.
Sardinians	Campidanese (Romance languages)	Casteddu	2/187	1.1%		
Eastern Andalusians	Andalusian (Romance)	Granada	2/180	1.1%		
Moravian Valachs	Romanian language (Romance languages)	Moravian Wallachia	1/94	1.1%		
Belarusians	Ukrainian (East Slavic)	Eastern Polesie	1/96	1%		
Estonians	Estonian (Uralic)	Estonia	2/209	1%		
Austrians	Southern Bavarian (Germanic)	Salzburg (state)	2/200	1%		
Ukrainians	Ukrainian (East Slavic)	Lviv Oblast	1/101	1%		
Aragonese	Aragonese and Castilian (Romance)	Aragón	2/200	1%		
Castellonenses	Catalan language (Romance)	Castelló	5/515	1%		
Bavarians	Bavarian (Germanic)	Bavaria	2/218	0.9%		T1a1a1a1b1-PF7445
Austrian Germans	Southern Bavarian (Germanic)	Upper Austria	2/225	0.9%		
Czechs	Czech (West Slavic)	South Moravia	2/216	0.9%		
Croatians	Croatian (West Slavic)	Zagreb	1/114	0.9%		
Catalans	Catalan (Romance)	Girona	2/219	0.9%		
Belarusians	Ukrainian (East Slavic)	Western Polesie	1/121	0.8%		
Mecklenburger	Mecklenburgisch-Vorpommersch (Germanic)	Mecklenburg	1/138	0.8%		T1a2b-L446(xCTS11984) DYS437=15
Bulgarians	Bulgarian language (South Slavic languages)	Sofia Province	2/257	0.8%		
Andalusians	Andalusian (Romance)	Huelva Seville Córdoba Jaén Málaga Cádiz Granada Almeria	1/144	0.7%		
Romanians	Romanian (Romance)	Romania	1/178	0.6%		
Catalans	Catalan (Romance)	Valencia	1/173	0.6%		
Slovaks	Slovak (West Slavic)	Slovakia	1/164	0.6%		
Irish	Gaeilge (Celtic)	Ireland	1/221	0.5%		
Czechs	Czech (West Slavic)	Prague	3/595	0.5%		
Germans	German (West Germanic)	area of Halle	1/234	0.4%		
Individuals living in Catalonia	Catalan language (Romance)	Barcelona metropolitan area	1/247	0.4%		
Slovaks	Slovak (West Slavic)	Slovakia	1/473	0.2%		

With K-M9+, unconfirmed but probable T-M70+: 14% (3/23) of Russians in Yaroslavl, 12.5% (3/24) of Italians in Matera, 10.3% (3/29) of Italians in Avezzano, 10% (3/30) of Tyroleans in Nonstal, 10% (2/20) of Italians in Pescara, 8.7% (4/46) of Italians in Benevento, 7.8% (4/51) of Italians in South Latium, 7.4% (2/27) of Italians in Paola, 7.3% (11/150) of Italians in Central-South Italy, 7.1% (8/113) of Serbs in Serbia, 4.7% (2/42) of Aromanians in Romania, 3.7% (3/82) of Italians in Biella, 3.7% (1/27) of Andalusians in Córdoba, 3.3% (2/60) of Leoneses in León, 3.2% (1/31) of Italians in Postua, 3.2% (1/31) of Italians in Cavaglià, 3.1% (3/97) of Calabrians in Reggio Calabria, 2.8% (1/36) of Russians in Ryazan Oblast, 2.8% (2/72) of Italians in South Apulia, 2.7% (1/37) of Calabrians in Cosenza, 2.6% (3/114) of Serbs in Belgrade, 2.5% (1/40) of Russians in Pskov, 2.4% (1/42) of Russians in Kaluga, 2.2% (2/89) of Transylvanians in Miercurea Ciuc, 2.2% (2/92) of Italians in Trino Vercellese, 1.9% (2/104) of Italians in Brescia, 1.9% (2/104) of Romanians in Romania, 1.7% (4/237) of Serbs and Montenegrins in Serbia and Montenegro, 1.7% (1/59) of Italians in Marche, 1.7% (1/59) of Calabrians in Catanzaro, 1.6% (3/183) of Greeks in Northern Greece, 1.3% (2/150) of Swiss Germans in Zürich Area, 1.3% (1/79) of Italians in South Tuscany and North Latium, 1.1% (1/92) of Dutch in Leiden, 0.5% (1/185) of Serbs in Novi Sad (Vojvodina), 0.5% (1/186) of Polish in Podlasie

Other parts that have been found to contain a significant proportion of haplogroup T-M184 individuals include Trentino (2/67 or 3%), Mariña Lucense (1/34 or 2.9%), Heraklion (3/104 or 2.9%), Roslavl (3/107 or 2.8%), Ourense (1/37 or 2.7%), Livny (3/110 or 2.7%), Biella (3/114 or 2.6%), Entre Douro (6/228 or 2.6%), Porto (3/118 or 2.5%), Urbino (1/40 or 2.5%), Iberian Peninsula (16/629 or 2.5%), Blekinge/Kristianstad (1/41 or 2.4%), Belarus (1/41 or 2.4%), Modena (3/130 or 2.3%), Provence-Alpes-Côte d'Azur (1/45 or 2.2%), Pristen (1/45 or 2.2%), Cáceres (2/91 or 2.2%), Brac (1/47 or 2.1%), Satakunta (1/48 or 2.1%), Western Croatia (2/101 or 2%), Ukrainia (1/50 or 2%), Greifswald (2/104 or 1.9%), Moldavians in Sofia (1/54 or 1.9%), Uppsala (1/55 or 1.8%), Lublin (2/112 or 1.8%), Pias in Beja (1/54 or 1.8%), Macedonian Greeks (1/57 or 1.8%), Nea Nikomedeia (1/57 or 1.8%), Sesklo/Dimini (1/57 or 1.8%), Lerna/Franchthi (1/57 or 1.8%), Açores (2/121 or 1.7%), Viana do Castelo (1/59 or 1.7%), Toulouse (1/67 or 1.5%), Belgorod (2/143 or 1.4%), Sardinia (1/77 or 1.3%). According to data from commercial testing, 3.9% of Italian males belonging to this haplogroup. Approximately 3% of Sephardi Jews and 2% of Ashkenazi Jews belong to haplogroup T.

=== Middle East and Caucasus ===
Haplogroup T has some significant frequencies in southeast and eastern Anatolia, the Zagros Mountains and both sides of the Persian Gulf.

Population	Language	Location	Members/Sample size	Percentage	Source	Notes
Georgians	Georgian (Kartvelian)	Khashuri	1/3	33.3%		
Priest Zoroastrians	Persian	Shiraz, Tehran and Yazd	2/8	25%		Not specified if Herbad or Mobad
Iraqi Jews	Judeo-Iraqi Arabic (Central Semitic)	Iraq	7/32	21.9%		12.5% T1a1a1a1a1a1-P77 and 9.4% T1a3-Y11151
Armenian Sasuntzis	Western Armenian dialect, Kurmanji and Dimli (Northwestern Iranian) languages	Sasun	21/104	20.2%		T1a1 and T1a2 subclades
Georgians	Georgian (Kartvelian)	Sighnaghi and Gurjaani	2/10	20%		
Georgians	Georgian (Kartvelian)	Kharagauli	1/5	20%		
Kumyks	Kumyk (Turkic)	Daghestani lowlands	2/10	20%		Reported as K* but according to Karafet16 and Yunusbayev12 only T fits.
Kurdish Jews	Judeo-Aramaic (Central Semitic)	Kurdistan	19/99	19.2%		
Kurdish Jews	Judeo-Aramaic (Central Semitic)	Kurdistan	9/50	18%		10% T1a1a1a1a1a1-P77 and 8% T1a1-L162
Druzes	Palestinian Arabic (Central Semitic)	Galilee	7/40	17.5%		
Assyrians	Aramaic (Central Semitic)	refugees in Armenia	16/106	15.1%		Reported as K*. Their homeland in the areas around Urmia.
Assyrians	Aramaic (Central Semitic)	Unknown	4/28	14.3%		
Georgians	Georgian (Kartvelian)	Dusheti	1/7	14.3%		
Iranian Jews	Judeo-Iranian (Southwestern Iranian)	Iran	3/22	13.6%		4.5% T1a1a1a1a1a1-P77 and 9.1% T1a3-Y11151
Zoroastrians	Persian	Kerman	5/37	13.5%		
Iraqi Jews	Judeo-Iraqi Arabic (Central Semitic)	Iraq	13/99	13.1%		
Bakhtiaris	Bakhtiari (Southwestern Iranian (Perside))	Izeh	13/103	12.6%		
Mountain Jews	Judeo-Tat (Southwestern Iranian)	Derbentsky District	2/17	11.8%		All belong to T1a1a1a1a1a1-P77
Armenians	Western Armenian dialect	Historical Southwestern Armenia	11/96	11.5%		
Emiratis	Gulf Arabic (Semitic)	Abu Dhabi	21/191	11%	(Note: W. Goodwin et al., " Department of Forensic and Investigative Science, " "http://www.yhrd.org/" (2012),)	
Assyrians	Assyrian (Central Semitic)	West Azerbaijan Province	4/39	10.3%		
Iranian Jews	Judeo-Iranian (Southwestern Iranian)	Iran	5/49	10.2%		
Persian Muslims	Persian	Shiraz	5/51	9.8%		
Persian Muslims	Persian	Kerman	6/66	9.1%		
Iraqis	Iraqi Arabic (Semitic)	Al-Qadisiyah	6/69	8.7%		
Armenians	Armenian	Armenia	35/413	8.5%		
Kurds	Sorani (Northwestern Iranian)	Kurdestan	5/59	8.5%		
Omani Arabs	Omani Arabic (Semitic)	Oman	10/121	8.3%		
Kurds	Sorani (Northwestern Iranian)	Kurdestan	2/25	8%		
Azeris	Azeri (Oghuz)	West Azerbaijan Province	5/63	7.9%		
Mazanderanis	Mazanderan (Western Iranian)	Mazandaran	1/13	7.7%		
Cypriots	Cypriot Greek	Cyprus	3/41	7.3%		
Iraqis	Iraqi Arabic (Semitic)	Iraq	10/139	7.2%		
Kuwaitis	Gulf Arabic (Semitic)	Kuwait	3/42	7.1%		
Iraqis	Iraqi Arabic (Semitic)	Iraq	3/43	7%		
Arabs	Levantine Arabic	Israel and Palestine	10/143	7%		
Persians	Farsi (Southwestern Iranian)	Fars	3/44	6.8%		
Christian Arabs	Levantine Arabic	Israel and Palestine	3/44	6.8%		
Western Armenians	Armenian	Eastern Turkey	6/90	6.7%		
Persians	Farsi (Southwestern Iranian)	Yazd	3/46	6.5%		
Armenians	Armenian	Gardman	6/96	6.3%		
Yezidis	Kurmanji (Northwestern Iranian)	refugees in Armenia	12/196	6.1%		Reported as K*. Their homeland in the areas around Laliş.
Muslim Arabs	Levantine Arabic	Israel and Palestine	7/119	5.9%		
		Zahedan, Baluchestan, Iran	6/103	5.8%		
Northern Armenians	Armenian	Northern Armenia, southern Georgia (Bolnisi, Akhalkalaki and Akhaltsikhe) and northwestern Azerbaijan (around Gyanja)	10/189	5.3%		
Armenians	Armenian	Tehran	2/38	5.3%		
Eastern Armenians	Armenian	Karabakh	11/215	5.1%		
Persians	Farsi (Southwestern Iranian)	Khorasan	3/59	5.1%		
Saudi Arabians	Arabic dialects (Semitic)	Saudi Arabia	8/157	5.1%		
Armenians	Armenian	Syunik	7/140	5%		
Emiratis	Gulf Arabic (Semitic)	United Arab Emirates	8/164	4.9%		
Lebanese Muslims	Lebanese Arabic (Semitic)	Lebanon	28/568	4.9%		
Cypriots	Cypriot Greek	Lemesos	6/126	4.8%		
Kumyks	Kumyk (Turkic)	Khasavyurtovsky District	1/21	4.8%		
Avars	Avar (Northeast Caucasian)	southeastern Dagestan	2/42	4.8%		
Kurds	Kurmanji (Northwestern Iranian)	Anatolia	12/251	4.8%		
Kurds	Kurdish dialects (Northwestern Iranian)	Kurdistan	6/126	4.8%	(Note: Carsten Hohoff and Bernd Brinkmann "Institut für Rechtsmedizin"," Universität Münster <http://www.yhrd.org>)	
Anizes	Gulf Arabic (Semitic)	Kuwait	1/21	4.7%		
Lebaneses	Levantine Arabic (Semitic)	Lebanon	43/914	4.7%		
Cypriots	Cypriot Greek	Cyprus	3/65	4.6%		
Maronites	Lebanese Arabic and Syriac (Semitic)	Lebanon	24/518	4.6%		
Armenians	Armenian	Ararat	2/44	4.6%		
Muslim Kurds	Kurdish dialects (Northwestern Iranian)	Kurdistan	4/95	4.2%		
Qeshmis	Qishmi (southwestern Iranian)	Qeshm	2/49	4.1%		
Lurs	Luri (Southwestern Iranian)	Lorestan	2/50	4%		
Sadats	Languages of Iran	Different cities of Iran	2/50	4%		
Persians	Persian	Eastern Iran	3/77	3.9%		
Armenians	Armenian	Lake Van	4/103	3.9%		
Saudi Arabians	Arabic dialects (Semitic)	Saudi Arabia	4/106	3.8%		
Turkish Cypriots	Cypriot Turkish	138 different villages, towns or cities from Cyprus	14/380	3.7%		Paternal lineages originating from the traditional Turkish Cypriot settlements throughout the island
		Birjand, South Khorasan, Iran	1/27	3.7%		All T1a3-Y12871
Armenians	Armenian	Ararat Valley	4/110	3.6%		
Armenians	Armenian	Armenia	2/57	3.5%		
Georgians	Georgian (Kartvelian)	Omalo	1/29	3.5%		
Iranians	Languages of Iran	South Iran	4/117	3.4%		
Ionians	Greek	Phokaia	1/31	3.2%		
Bandaris	Bandari (Southwestern Iranian)	Bandar Abbas	4/131	3.1%		
Cypriots	Cypriot Greek	Larnaka	2/67	3%		
Alans	Karachay-Baksan-Chegem (Turkic)	Kabardino-Balkaria	1/69	2.9%		
Jordanians	Arabic dialects (Semitic)	Jordan	8/273	2.9%		
Cypriots	Cypriot Greek	Ammochostos	3/122	2.5%		
Lezghins	Lezgian (Northeast Caucasian)	Southern Dagestan	2/81	2.5%		
Turks	Turkish	Turkey	13/523	2.5%		
Persians	Persian (Southwestern Iranian)	Esfahan	1/13	2.4%		
Iranians	Languages of Iran	Iran	7/324	2.2%		
Azerbaijani Muslims	Azerbaijani (Turkic)	Uromia	2/91	2.2%		
Yemenite Jews	Hebrew and Arabic	Yemen	2/94	2.1%		
Andis	Andi (Northeast Caucasian)	western Dagestan	1/49	2%		
Cypriots	Cypriot Greek	Paphos	2/105	1.9%		
Cypriots	Cypriot Greek	Nicosia	3/161	1.9%		
Assyrians	Assyrian Neo-Aramaic (Semitic)	Uromia and Tehran	1/55	1.8%		
Abkhazians	Abkhaz (Northwest Caucasian)	Abkhazia	1/58	1.7%		
Kuwaitis	Gulf Arabic (Semitic)	Kuwait	2/117	1.7%		
Greek Orthodox	Koine Greek	Lebanon	2/116	1.7%		
		Mashhad, Razavi Khorasan, Iran	2/129	1.6%		0.8% T1a3-Y11151 (xY8614)
Aeolians	Greek	Smyrna	1/68	1.5%		
Georgians	Georgian (Kartvelian)	Georgia	1/66	1.5%		
Turkmens	Turkmen (Oghuz)	Golestan	1/68	1.5%		
Kumyks	Kumyk (Turkic)	Northern Dagestan	1/73	1.4%		
Kuban Nogays	Nogai (Turkic)	north of Sea of Azov around Prymorsk	1/87	1.2%		
Ossetian Digors	Digorian (Scythian)	North Ossetia	1/127	0.8%		
Yemeni Arabs	Sanaani Arabic (Semitic)	Sanaa	1/129	0.8%	(Note: Uta D. Immel et al., "Institut für Rechtsmedizin, Martin-Luther Universität Haale/Saale," "http://www.yhrd.org/" (1999),)	
Syrians	Syrian Arabic (Semitic)	Syria	4/518	0.8%		
Kabardins	Kabardian (Northwest Caucasian)	Kabardino-Balkaria	1/140	0.7%		
Circassians	Adyghe (Northwest Caucasian)	Republic of Adygea	1/142	0.7%		
Abkhazians	Abkhaz (Northwest Caucasian)	Abkhazia	1/162	0.6%		

There are also unconfirmed reports of T-M70+ amongst 28% (7/25) of Lezginians in Dagestan, 21.7% (5/23) of Ossetians in Zamankul, 14% (7/50) of Iranians in Isfahan, 13% (3/23) of Ossetians in Zil'ga, 12.6% (11/87) of Kurmanji Kurds in Eastern Turkey, 11.8% (2/17) of Palestinian Arabs in Palestine, 8.3% (1/12) of Iranians in Shiraz, 8.3% (2/24) of Ossetians in Alagir, 8% (2/25) of Kurmanji Kurds in Georgia, 7.5% (6/80) of Iranians in Tehran, 7.4% (10/135) of Palestinian Arabs in Israeli Village, 7% (10/143) of Palestinian Arabs in Israel and Palestine, 5% (1/19) of Chechens in Chechenia, 4.2% (3/72) of Azerbaijanians in Azerbaijan, 4.1% (2/48) of Iranians in Isfahan, 4% (4/100) of Armenians in Armenia, 4% (1/24) of Bedouins in Israel and 2.6% (1/39) of Turks in Ankara.

=== Africa ===
Fossils excavated at the Late Neolithic site of Kelif el Boroud in Morocco, which have been radiocarbon-dated to around 3,000 BCE, have been found to belong to haplogroup T-M184.

Population	Language	Location	Members/Sample size	Percentage	Source	Notes
Somalis (Dir clan)	Somali (East Cushitic)	Djibouti	24/24	100%		The main sub-clans of the Dir clan in Djibouti are the Issa and Gadabuursi.
Somalis (Dire Dawa)	Somali (East Cushitic)	Dire Dawa	14/17	82.4%		Dir sub-clans of Dire Dawa are Issa, Gurgura and Gadabuursi.
Anteony	Antemoro (Plateau Malagasy)	old Antemoro Kingdom	22/37	59.5%		The Anteony are the descendants of aristocrats, from whom the Antemoro king is chosen. Can be grouped into the Silamo, because they have the right to undertake the ritual slaughter of animals (Sombily)
Somalis (Dir clan) and Afars	Somali and Afar (East Cushitic)	Djibouti	30/54	56.6%		Mixed sample of Somali and Afar individuals.
Somalis (Ethiopia)	Somali (East Cushitic)	Shilavo (woreda) (Somali Region of Ethiopia)	5/10	50%		The geographic location of this Ethiopia sample as seen in Fig.1.
Somalis (Isaaq)	Somali (East Cushitic)	Somaliland	4/4	100%		All belonging to the T1a-Y16897 subclade
Afars	Afar language (East Cushitic)	Djibouti	5/20	25%		
Toubou	Toubou	Chad		31%		All belonging to the T1a-PF5662 subclade
Akie	Akie people (Nilotic)	Tanzania	3/13	23.1%	[Hirbo et al.]	Akie people have remnants of a Cushitic language
Somalis	Somali (East Cushitic)	Jijiga (Somali Region of Ethiopia)	19/83	22.9%		Jijiga Somalis.
Arabs from Somalia	Somali (East Cushitic)	immigrants in Yemen	7/33	21.2%		
Lemba	Venda and Shona (Bantu)	South Africa	6/34	17.6%		Exclusively belong to T1a2* (old T1b*). Possible recent founder effect. Low frequency of T1a2 has been observed in Bulgarian Jews and Turks but is not found in other Jewish communities. Y-str Haplotypes close to some T1a2 Armenians.
Rangi	Rangi Language (Bantu)	Tanzania	5/32	15.6%	[Hirbo et al.]	
-	Somalia	15/105	14.3%			
Iraqw	Iraqw language (Cushitic)	Tanzania	6/47	12.8%	[Hirbo et al.]	
Wachagga	Kichagga (Niger-Congo)	Dār as-Salām	3/24	12.5%		Mixed with Rift Southern Cushites.
Somali	Somali (Cushitic)	immigrants to Norway	12/104	11.5%		
Bench	Bench(northern Omotic)	Bench Maji Zone	14/126	11.4%		
Kores	(Cushitic)	SNNP	2/18	11.1%		
Oromo	Afaan Oromo language (Cushitic)	Oromiyaa	1/9	11.1%		
Fulbe	Fula	northern Cameroon	3/27	11.1%		
Gorowa	Gorowa language (Cushitic)	Tanzania	2/19	10.5%	[Hirbo et al.]	
Somali	Somali (Cushitic)	immigrants to Denmark	21/201	10.4%		
Upper Egyptians	Egyptian Arabic	Luxor Governorate	3/29	10.3%		
Kontas	Konta language (Omotic)	Konta special woreda	11/107	10.3%		
Rendille	Rendille language (Cushitic)	Marsabit County	3/31	9.7%	[Hirbo et al.]	
Datogs	Rendille language (Cushitic)	Tanzania	3/31	9.7%		
Gewadas	Gewada language (east Cushitic)	SNNP	11/116	9.5%		
Antalaotra	Antemoro (Plateau Malagasy)	old Antemoro Kingdom	4/43	9.3%		The Antalaotra are in charge of the magical and religious domains; they have the ability to read and write Sorabe. Can be grouped into the Silamo, because they have the right to undertake the ritual slaughter of animals (Sombily)
Upper Egyptians	Egyptian Arabic	Aswan Governorate	1/11	9.1%		
N'Djamena Mix	Mix	N'Djamena	5/55	9.1%	Marc Haber 2016	All belonging to the T1a-PF5662 subclade
Upper Egyptians	Egyptian Arabic	Assiut Governorate	6/70	8.6%		
Konsos	(Semitic)	Konso special woreda	2/24	8.3%		
Somali	Somali (Cushitic)	immigrants to Sweden	12/147	8.2%		
Arabs and Berbers	Egyptian Arabic and Siwi	Lower Egypt	12/147	8.2%		
Upper Egyptians	Egyptian Arabic	Sohag Governorate	4/52	7.7%		
Egyptians	Erythraic (Cushitic)	Egypt	7/92	7.6%		If the K* sample is M184+ then 8.7%
Tigrayans	Tigrinya (South Semitic)	Tigray Region	2/30	6.7%		
Dirashas	Dirasha (east Cushitic)	Dirashe special woreda	5/79	6.3%		
Canarians	Canarian Spanish	Tenerife	11/178	6.2%		
Kordofanians	Kordofanian	Kurdufan	4/69	5.8%		
Upper Egyptians	Egyptian Arabic	Qena Governorate	3/52	5.8%		
Tuareg	Tuareg (Berber)	Gorom-Gorom	1/18	5.6%		
Afars	Afar (East Cushitic)	Afar Region	6/111	5.4%		
Ethiopians	Ethiopian languages	Ethiopia	4/74	5.4%		
Mashiles	Mashile language (Cushitic)	SNNP	7/130	5.4%		
Gurages	Gurage languages (South Semitic)	SNNP	6/118	5.1%		
Turu	Nyaturu (Bantu)	Tanzania	1/20	5%		
Moroccan Jews	Haketia (Romance)	Israel	1/20	5%		
Gedeos	Gedeo (east Cushitic)	SNNP	6/122	4.9%		
Wairak	Iraqw (Cushitic)	Tanzania	2/41	4.9%		
Western Libyans	Libyan Arabic (Semitic)	Tripoli region	7/142	4.9%		
Tunisians	Tunisian Arabic (Semitic)	Sfax	5/105	4.8%		
Libyans	Libyan Arabic (Semitic)	Tripoli area	3/63	4.8%		
Kanuri	Kanuri	Cameroon	1/21	4.8%	[Hirbo et al.]	
Iraqw	Iraqw (Cushitic)	Tanzania	2/43	4.7%		
Yems	Yemsa (Omotic)	SNNP	5/107	4.7%		
Jews	(Semitic)	Ethiopia	1/22	4.5%		
Gobeze	Cushitic	SNNP	5/113	4.4%		
Upper Egyptians	Egyptian Arabic	Minya Governorate	1/23	4.3%		
Konsos	Konso language (East Cushitic)	Konso special woreda	4/94	4.3%		
Kembaatas	East Cushitic	Kembata Tembaro Zone	4/102	3.9%		
Tigrayans	Tigrinya (South Semitic)	Eritrea	1/28	3.6%		
Tigrayans	Tigrinya (South Semitic)	Eritrea	1/31	3%		
Amharas	Amharic (Semitic)	Ethiopia	1/34	2.9%		
Hutus	Rwanda-Rundi (Niger-Congo)	Rwanda	1/39	2.6%		
Lower Egyptians	Egyptian Arabic (Semitic)	Mansoura	1/44	2.2%		
Berbers	Shilha (Berber)	Siwa Oasis	2/93	2.2%		
Meru	Meru (Northeast Bantu)	Tanzania	2/99	2%		
Itam	Ibibio	Obong Itam (Southeast Nigeria)	1/50	2%		
Cape Verdeans	Cape Verdean Creole (Portuguese Creole)	Windward islands São Nicolau, São Vicente, and Santo Antão	2/101	2%		
Ovimbundo	Umbundu and Portuguese	Angola	1/53	1.9%		
Tunisians	Tunisian Arabic (Semitic)	Tunis	1/54	1.9%		
Berbers	Shilha (Berber)	Asni	1/54	1.9%		
Eastern Libyans	Libyan Arabic (Semitic)	Benghazi	4/214	1.9%		
Algerians	Algerian Arabic (Semitic)	Algeria	3/164	1.8%		
Baribas	Baatonum (Niger–Congo)	Benin	1/57	1.8%		T1a-M70(xT1a2-L131)
Bokoras	Karamojong (Eastern Nilotic)	Karamoja region	1/59	1.7%		
Lower Egyptians	Egyptian Arabic (Semitic)	Cairo	1/63	1.6%		
Tumbuka	Tumbuka (Niger-Congo)	northern Malawi	1/61	1.6%		
Mozabites	Mozabite (Berber)	Ghardaia	1/68	1.5%		
Tunisians	Tunisian Arabic (Semitic)	South Tunisia	3/200	1.5%		
Soussians	Tunisian Arabic (Semitic)	Sousse	3/220	1.4%		
Chewa	Chewa (Niger-Congo)	Malawi	1/92	1.1%		
Maasai	Maasai (Eastern Nilotic)	Kinyawa (Mashuru)	1/100	1%	YHRD	
Bantu	Narrow Bantu (Niger-Congo)	Pretoria	1/98	1%		
Nilotes	Ateker (Eastern Nilotic)	Karamoja region	1/118	0.8%		
Andalusians	Andalusian Arabic (Semitic)	Testour, El Alia, Gualaat-El-Andalous, Slouguia	1/132	0.8%		Refugees from Al-Andalus following the capitulation of the Islamic kingdoms in Valencia and Granada
Bantus	Bantu	Botswana, Namibia and Zambia	1/140	0.7%		Father and paternal grandfather belonged to the same ethnolinguistic group
Basothos	Sesotho (Niger-Congo)	Lesotho	1/181	0.6%		
Moroccans	Moroccan Arabic (Semitic)	Casablanca metropolitan area	1/166	0.6%		The industrial capital of Morocco where the urban growth is maintained by immigration from all parts of Morocco
Khoisans	Khoisan	Botswana, Namibia and Zambia	1/371	0.3%		Father and paternal grandfather belonged to the same ethnolinguistic group

=== South Asia ===
T1a-M70 in India has been considered to be of West Eurasian origin.

Population	Language	Location	Members/Sample size	Percentage	Source	Notes
Kurru	Yerukala (Dravidian)	Andhra Pradesh	10/18	55.6%		
Bauris	Bengali (Indo-Aryan)	West Bengal	10/19	52.6%		K* is found at 6/19, if M70- but M184+, then could be 84.2%.
Lodha	Lodhi (Sora–Juray–Gorum Munda)	West Bengal	2/4	50%		
Rajus	Telugu (Dravidian)	Andhra Pradesh	3/19	15.9%		
Maheli	Mahali (Kherwari Munda)	West Bengal	2/13	15.3%		
Chenchus	Chenchu (Dravidian)	Andhra Pradesh	3/20	15%		K* is found at 7/20, if M70- but M184+, then could be 50%
Kare Vokkal	Kannada (Dravidian)	Uttara Kannada	4/30	13.3%		K* is found at 3/30, if M70- but M184+, then could be 23.3%
Banjaras	Lambadi (Indo-Aryan)	Andhra Pradesh	2/18	11.1%		
Gonds	Gondi (Dravidian)	South Uttar Pradesh	4/38	10.6%		
Gonds	Gondi (Dravidian)	Madhya Pradesh	10/139	7.2%		
Indians	languages of India	South India	18/305	5.9%		
Maheli	Mahali (Kherwari Munda)	Jamshedpur from Jharkhand; Purulia, Midnapore & other location from West Bengal	2/38	5.3%		Two samples from different studies grouped together
Chenchus	Chenchu (Dravidian)	Andhra Pradesh	3/61	4.9%		Samples from Trivedi et al. and Kivisild et al.
Banjaras	Lambadi (Indo-Aryan)	Andhra Pradesh	2/53	3.8%		Two samples from different studies grouped together
Indians	languages of India	East India	14/367	3.8%		
Gujaratis	Gujarati (Indo-Aryan)	Gujarat	1/29	3.4%		
Lodha	Lodhi (Sora–Juray–Gorum Munda)	Midnapore & other location from West Bengal	2/71	2.8%		Three samples from different studies grouped together
Sahariyas	Saharia (Munda)	Madhya Pradesh	2/73	2.7%		
Tamtas	(Indo-Aryan)	Bageshwar	1/34	2.9%		
Kshatriyas	(Indo-Aryan)	Pithoragarh	2/79	2.5%		
Aryas	Arya (Indo-Aryan)	Nainital	1/46	2.2%		
Laotians	Lao (Tai-Kadai)	Laos	1/53	1.9%		
Maravars	Tamil (Dravidian)	Ramanathapuram	1/80	1.3%		Dry Land Farmers
Garos	Garo (Sino-Tibetan)	Tangail	1/120	0.8%		Likely P77+

With K-M9+, unconfirmed but probable T-M70+: 56.6% (30/53) of Kunabhis in Uttar Kannada, 32.5% (13/40) of Kammas in Andhra Pradesh, 26.8% (11/41) of Brahmins in Visakhapatnam, 25% (1/4) of Kattunaiken in South India, 22.4% (11/49) of Telugus in Andhra Pradesh, 20% (1/5) of Ansari in South Asia, (2/20) of Poroja in Andhra Pradesh, 9.8% (5/51) of Kashmiri Pandits in Kashmir, 8.2% (4/49) of Gujars in Kashmir, 7.7% (1/13) of Siddis (migrants from Ethiopia) in Andhra Pradesh, 5.5% (3/55) of Adi in Northeast India, 5.5% (7/128) of Pardhans in Adilabad, 5.3% (2/38) of Brahmins in Bihar, 4.3% (1/23) of Bagata in Andhra Pradesh, 4.2% (1/24) of Valmiki in Andhra Pradesh, (1/32) of Brahmins in Maharashtra, 3.1% (2/64) of Brahmins in Gujarat, 2.9% (1/35) of Rajput in Uttar Pradesh, 2.3% (1/44) of Brahmins in Peruru, and 1.7% (1/59) of Manghi in Maharashtra.

Also in Desasth-Brahmins in Maharashtra (1/19 or 5.3%) and Chitpavan-Brahmins in Konkan (1/21 or 4.8%), Chitpavan-Brahmins in Konkan (2/66 or 3%).

=== Central Asia & East Asia ===
Population	Language	Location	Members/Sample size	Percentage	Source	Notes						
Momyns	Old Basmyl/Kazakh (Turkic)	Argyn tribe, Kazakhstan	6/100	6.3%		The outlier Babasan subclan is excluded from "sample size" and "percentage". 5 out of 6 Clans and 13 out of 19 Subclans have T-M184 members.						
Meyrams	Old Basmyl/Kazakh (Turkic)	Argyn tribe	1/10	6%		5 out of 5 Clans and 11 out of 16 Subclans have T-M184 members.						
Xibes	Xibe (Tungusic)	Xinjiang, China	1/8	12.5%								
Xibes	Xibe (Tungusic)	Xinjiang	3/32	9.4%								
Hans	-	Ili	3/32	9.4%		K* (xNOP)						
Bajo sea Nomads	Bajaw (Malayo-Polynesian)	Sulawesi, Indonesia	2/27	7.4%		T1a-M70						
Yugurs	Eastern Yugur and Western Yugur	Sunan Yugur Autonomous County, Gansu, China	2/32	6.3%		K* (xN-M231, O-M175, P-M45)						
Tajiks	Tajik (Southwestern Iranian)	Samangan Province, Afghanistan	1/16	6.3%								
Khampas	Khams Tibetan (Sino-Tibetan)	Markham	1/18	5.6%		T-M272						
Adis	Adi (Sino-Tibetan)	Arunachal Pradesh, India	3/55	5.5%								
Xibes	Xibe (Tungusic)	(not stated)	2/41	4.9%		K* (xNOP)						
Mongolians	Mongolian (Mongolic)	Inner Mongolia, China	2/45	4.4%		K* (xNOP)						
Tajiks	Tajik (Southwestern Iranian)	Afghanistan	2/56	3.6%								
Uzbeks	Uzbek (Turkic)	Sar-e Pol Province, Afghanistan	1/28	3.6%								
Sherpas	Sherpa (Sino-Tibetan)	Khumjung, Namche, Chaurikharka and Lukla	5/157	3.2%		K-M9 (xM-P256, NO-M214, P-M45) Parents and grandparents were reported to be Sherpas. Individuals unrelated for at least three generations.						
Oroqen	Oroqen (Tungusic)	(not stated)	1/31	3.2%		K* (xNOP)						
Tajiks	Tajik (Southwestern Iranian)	Takhar Province, Afghanistan	1/35	2.9%			Manchu	Manchu (Tungusic)	(not stated)	1/35	2.9%	K* (xNOP)
Tajiks	Darî (Southwestern Iranian)	Ferghana	1/35	2.9%								
Tibetans	Dbus (Sino-Tibetan)	Dromo, Tibet	1/39	2.6%		T-M272						
Uyghur	Uyghur (Turkic)	Xinjiang	1/48 (1/4 samples)	2.1%								
Tu	Monguor (Mongolic)	Qinghai, China	1/50	2%		K* (xN-M231, O-M175, P-M45)						
Pashtuns	Pashto (Eastern Iranian)	Kunduz Province, Afghanistan	1/53	1.9%								
Mongolians	Mongolian (Mongolic)	Mongolia	1/65	1.5%		K* (xNOP)						
Kozha Kazakhs (Steppe Clergy)	Kazakh (Turkic)	Kazakhstan	1/71	1.4%		T1a-M70						
Uyghur	Uyghur (Turkic)	Xinjiang	3/284	1.1%								
Uzbeks	Uzbek (Turkic)	Jawzjan Province, Afghanistan	1/94	1.1%								
Mongolians	Mongolian (Mongolic)	Inner Mongolia, China	1/100	1%								
Ethnic Pashtuns	Pashto (Eastern Iranian)	mainly Kandahar Province, Afghanistan province of	1/141	0.7%								
Yousafzai	Pashto (Eastern Iranian)	Khyber Pakhtunkhwa Province, Afghanistan	1/146	0.7%								
Uyghur	Uyghur (Turkic)	Hotan Prefecture, Xinjiang, China	3/478	0.6%								
Tibetans	Dbus (Sino-Tibetan)	Qüxü, Tibet	1/203	0.5%		T-M272						
Han Chinese	Mandarin (Sino-Tibetan)	Jilin, China	1/196	0.5%								
Mongolians	Mongolian (Mongolic)	Ordos (city), China	1/258	0.4%		Could be 0.8% (2/258)						
Han Chinese	Mandarin (Sino-Tibetan)	Qujing, Yuxi and Honghe County, China	1/320	0.3%		K* (xN-M231, O-M175, P-M45)						

Unconfirmed but probable T-M70+: 2% (4/204) of Hui in Liaoning (China), and 0.9% (1/113) of Bidayuh in Sarawak.

=== Americas (post-colonisation) ===
Population	Language	Location	Members/Sample size	Percentage	Source	Notes
Panchos	Castilian (Romance)	Panchimalco	3/11	27.3%		T-M184
Quechuas	Quechua	Lima Region	3/11	27.3%		Predicted but possible convergence with Q markers.
Movimas	Movima language (Language isolate)	Beni	1/5	20%		
Colombians	Colombian Spanish (Romance)	Antioquia	9/51	17.6%		
Colombians	Colombian Spanish (Romance)	Aranzazu, Caldas	22/190	11.6%		
Panamanians	Castilian (Romance languages)	Los Santos Province	3/30	10%		
Centralwest Argentinians	Argentinian Spanish (Romance)	San Luis	3/30	10%		
Colombians	Colombian Spanish (Romance)	Antioquia	6/61	9.8%		Antioquia except Marinilla and its zone of influence
Napu runas	Kichwa	Ecuadorian Amazon	2/21	9.5%		Predicted but possible convergence with Q markers.
Colombians	Colombian Spanish (Romance)	Soplaviento	1/11	9.1%		T1a-M70
Yanesha	Yanesha	Yurinaqui (Peruvian Amazon)	1/12	8.3%		
Yanesha	Yanesha	Mayme (Peruvian Amazon)	1/12	8.3%		
Colombians	Colombian Spanish (Romance)	Huila	3/42	7.1%		
Bahamians	Bahamian English (West Germanic)	Long Island	3/43	7%		
Panamanians	Castilian (Romance languages)	Panama Province	3/43	7%		
Northwest Argentinians	Argentinian Spanish (Romance)	Mountainous region of San Salvador de Jujuy	6/86	7%		
Kolla	Quechua, Aymara and Argentinian Spanish	Mountainous region of Tucumán	2/29	6.9%		
Centralwest Argentinians	Argentinian Spanish (Romance)	Tucumán	2/30	6.7%		
Guna	Guna (Chibchan languages)	Guna Yala	1/16	6.3%		According to Hamilton 2014, around 2% of Guna people in Guna Yala are Albinos. This is the highest known frequency in the world
Basques	Basque (Isolate language)	Nevada	1/16	6.3%	(Note: Laura Valverde Potes et al., "Grupo BIOMICs / BIOMICs Research Group," "http://www.yhrd.org/" (2011),)	
Colombians	Colombian Spanish (Romance)	Marinilla, El Peñol, Antioquia, El Santuario, Cocorná, El Carmen de Viboral, Granada, Antioquia and Guatapé	15/246	6.1%		
Centralwest Argentinians	Argentinian Spanish (Romance)	Mountainous region of La Rioja (Capital)	5/87	5.7%		
Kolla	Quechua, Aymara and Argentinian Spanish	Mountainous region of Jujuy	1/18	5.6%		
Colombians	Colombian Spanish (Romance)	Aburrá Valley and Rionegro (Antioquia)	3/55	5.5%		
Colombians	Colombian Spanish (Romance)	Tolima	2/41	4.9%		
Venezuelans	Venezuelan Castilian (Romance languages)	Caracas	3/62	4.8%		
Yanesha	Yanesha	Ñagazu (Peruvian Amazon)	1/21	4.8%		
Northeast Argentinians	Argentinian Spanish (Romance)	Corrientes	1/21	4.8%		
Colombians	Colombian Spanish (Romance)	Cundinamarca	1/22	4.5%		
Mestizos	Guatemalan Castilian	Guatemala	5/115	4.4%		T-M184
Northwest Argentinians	Argentinian Spanish (Romance)	Jujuy	2/50	4%		
Chileans	Chilean Spanish (Romance languages)	Concepción	8/198	4%		
Centralwest Argentinians	Argentinian Spanish (Romance)	Mountainous region of Mendoza (Capital)	3/75	4%		
Mayas	Guatemalan Castilian	Guatemala	1/110	3.6%		T-M184
Yanesha	Yanesha	7 de Junio - Villa América (Peruvian Amazon)	1/29	3.5%		
Brazilians	Brazilian Portuguese (Romance)	Serra, Espírito Santo	1/29	3.5%		
Ecuadorians	Castilian (Romance languages)	Quito	4/120	3.3%		
Central Argentinians	Argentinian Spanish (Romance)	La Pampa	1/30	3.3%		
Central Argentinians	Argentinian Spanish (Romance)	Córdoba	1/31	3.2%		
Chileans	Chilean Spanish (Romance languages)	Temuco	6/194	3.1%		
Panamanians	Castilian (Romance languages)	Herrera Province	1/36	2.8%		
Venezuelans	Venezuelan Castilian (Romance languages)	Maracaibo	3/111	2.7%		
Chachapoyas	Chacha	northeastern Peruvian Andes	3/122	2.5%		
Nicas	Nicaraguan Castilian	Nicaragua	4/165	2.4%		Mestizo individuals
Colombians	Colombian Spanish (Romance)	Piendamó, Silvia, Puracé, Jambaló, Páez, Popayán, El Tambo, Sotará, La Vega, Cauca, San Sebastián, Cauca and Bolivar	1/48	2.1%		Mix sample of Ethnicities
Europeans	Brazilian Portuguese (Romance languages)	Rio Grande do Sul	5/255	2%		
Chileans	Chilean Spanish (Romance languages)	Santiago de Chile	4/196	2%		
Centralwest Argentinians	Argentinian Spanish (Romance)	Buenos Aires	3/150	2%		
Palenques	Palenquero (Castilian-Bantu)	Palenque de San Basilio (Arriba moiety)	1/52	1.9%		
Quechuas	Quechua	Bolivia	1/55	1.8%		
Bahamians	Bahamian English (West Germanic)	Eleuthera	1/60	1.7%		
Mexicans	Mexican Castilian (Romance languages)	Querétaro	2/121	1.7%		Mestizo individuals
Mexicans	Mexican Castilian (Romance languages)	Guanajuato	1/63	1.6%		Mestizo individuals
Colombians	Colombian Spanish (Romance)	Peque (Antioquia)	1/62	1.6%		
Chileans	Chilean Spanish (Romance languages)	Punta Arenas	3/194	1.6%		
Colombians	Colombian Spanish (Romance)	Cartagena	1/61	1.6%		T1a-M70
Salvadorans	Castilian (Romance)	El Salvador	2/150	1.3%		
Jamaicans	Jamaican Patois (English creole)	Jamaica	2/159	1.3%		
Colombians	Colombian Spanish (Romance)	Cartagena	2/173	1.2%		
Panamanians	Castilian (Romance languages)	Chiriquí Province	1/92	1.1%		
Ticos	Costa Rican Castilian	Costa Rica	1/100	1%		
Brazilians	Brazilian Portuguese (Romance)	Santa Catarina	1/109	0.9%		
Virgin islanders	Virgin Islands Creole English (Germanic)	Saint Thomas (Virgin Islands)	1/134	0.8%		
Hondurans	Honduran Castilian	Honduras	1/128	0.8%		Mestizo individuals
Admixed population	-	Macapá	1/138	0.7%		
Belizeans	Belizean Castilian and Belizean Creole	Belize	1/157	0.6%		
Chileans	Chilean Spanish (Romance languages)	Iquique	1/207	0.5%		
Brazilians	Brazilian Portuguese (Romance)	Espírito Santo	1/253	0.4%		

== Ancient DNA ==
=== Abel Beth Maacah ===
Abel Beth Maacah 2201 was a man with Y-DNA T-CTS2860 who lived between 1014 - 836 BCE during the Levant Iron Age and was found in the region now known as Abel Beth Maacah, Metula, Israel. At the Iron Age layer which also produces a Yahwistic inscription on a pottery jar from the biblical site of Abel-beth-maachah, which bears a faint Hebrew inscription of the name "Benayau". I2201 from Agranat-Tamir et al. 2020.

=== Ancient Egypt ===
Egyptian mummy 2516 was a man who lived between 798 - 591 BCE during the Third Intermediate Age and was found in the region now known as Egypt. He is wearing a curly wig, a shabti made of multicoloured wood and a multicoloured wesekh-collar. There is an inscription, encircling the entire body in horizontal lines, with the text of Chapter VI of the Book of the Dead. The Ancient Egyptian was under T-Y6671, the saharan offshoot of T-L208 ultimately derived from T-M70. The finding was by Wurst et al. 2024.

=== Ancient Nubia ===
Multiple Nubians from Kulubnarti site were found to be of the Haplogroup T lineage (T-Y6671), same as the ancient Egyptian clade. The Kulubnarti Nubians had ~43% Nilotic-related ancestry (individual variation between ~36–54%) with the remaining ancestry consistent with being introduced through Egypt and ultimately deriving from an ancestry pool like that found in the Bronze and Iron Age Levant. It is hypothesized "T" lineage originated or evolved in the Levant, and became Saharan Pastoralists via their spread into Africa during the Neolithic. T-Y6671 is associated with this spread. This falls in line perfectly when considering the Levantine-like DNA that the Nubians harbor in concomitance to T-Y6671. The Nubian samples include I6328, I6340 & I19140. These Nubians lived during 700 - 990 CE and were found in "R and S Cemeteries", where E & J haplogroup was buried amongst these "T" individuals. The finding is presented by Sirak et al.

=== Neolithic North Africans ===
During the Neolithic Era a new ancestry from the Levant appears in the Maghreb, coinciding with the arrival of pastoralism in the region, and all three ancestries blend together during the Late Neolithic. This places Haplogroup T as a pastoralist lineage, and due to its circumstances, is associated with Levantine expansion, spreading Afro-Asiatic languages, eventually morphing into Saharan Pastoralists and spreading Afro-Asiatic languages. Sample SKH003 and SKH002 were Neolithic local Northwest African (Maghrebis) and differentiated from older Northwest Africans exactly due to an influx of Levantine PPNB ancestry. This ancestry was introduced with this new Y-chromosome haplogroup (T-M70), and is very clearly a Male dominated migration, as only Y-chromosome lineages were replaced, and no mtdna was introduced. Unlike the earlier expansion of Anatolian Neolithic / Early European farmer dna, which were maternally lead migrations. "Because this Neolithic Levantine ancestry has not been observed on the European side of the Mediterranean during the Neolithic, it probably represents an independent expansion of people from the Levant into North Africa."

=== Peki'in Cave, Israel ===
A 2018 study conducted by scholars from Tel-Aviv University, the Israel Antiquities Authority and Harvard University had discovered that 22 out of the 600 people who were buried in Peki'in cave from the Chalcolithic Period were of both local Levantine and Zagros area ancestries, or as phrased in the paper itself: "Ancient DNA from Chalcolithic Israel reveals the role of population mixture in cultural transformation," the scientists concluded that the homogeneous community found in the cave could source ~57% of its ancestry from groups related to those of the local Levant Neolithic, ~26% from groups related to those of the Anatolian Neolithic, and ~17% from groups related to those of the Iran Chalcolithic.". The scholars noted that the Zagros genetic material held "Certain characteristics, such as genetic mutations contributing to blue eye color, were not seen in the DNA test results of earlier Levantine human remains MTDNA blue-eyed, fair-skinned community didn't continue, but at least now researchers have an idea why. "These findings suggest that the rise and fall of the Chalcolithic culture are probably due to demographic changes in the region".

We find that the individuals buried in Peqi'in Cave represent a relatively genetically homogenous population. This homogeneity is evident not only in the genome-wide analyses but also in the fact that most of the male individuals (nine out of ten) belong to the Y-chromosome Haplogroup T (Y-DNA), a lineage thought to have diversified in the Near East. This finding contrasts with both earlier (Neolithic and Epipaleolithic) Levantine populations, which were dominated by Haplogroup E (Y-DNA), and later Bronze Age individuals, all of whom belonged to Haplogroup J (Y-DNA).

=== Ancient city of Ebla ===
In the ancient city of Ebla in Syria in the Bronze Age, one individual was found belonging to haplogroup T-L162 (T1a1).

=== Alalakh Amorite city-state ===
One individual from Alalakh who lived circa 2014-1781 BC, belonged to haplogroup T-CTS11451 (T1a1a).

== Notable haplogroup members ==
=== Elite endurance runners ===
Possible patterns between Y-chromosome and elite endurance runners were studied in an attempt to find a genetic explanation to the Ethiopian endurance running success. Given the superiority of East African athletes in international distance running over the past four decades, it has been speculated that they are genetically advantaged. Elite marathon runners from Ethiopia were analysed for K*(xP) which according to the previously published Ethiopian studies is attributable to the haplogroup T.

According to further studies, T1a1a* (L208) was found to be proportionately more frequent in the elite marathon runners sample than in the control samples than any other haplogroup, therefore this y-chromosome could play a significant role in determining Ethiopian endurance running success. Haplogroup T1a1a* was found in 14% of the elite marathon runners sample of whom 43% of this sample are from Arsi province. In addition, haplogroup T1a1a* was found in only 4% of the Ethiopian control sample and only 1% of the Arsi province control sample. T1a1a* is positively associated with aspects of endurance running, whereas E1b1b1 (old E3b1) is negatively associated.

=== House of Khalifa ===
The ruling family of the Kingdom of Bahrain is the House of Khalifa (Arabic: آل خليفة, romanized: Āl Khalīfah) is confirmed West Asian Y-DNA Haplogroup T-L206 subclade of P77*.

The house belongs to the Utab tribe, which is part of the larger Anizah tribal confederation, that migrated from Central Arabia to Kuwait and then ruled all of Qatar. In 1999, Hamad bin Isa Al Khalifa became the Emir of Bahrain and proclaimed himself the King of Bahrain in 2002.

The T-FT364053 haplogroup of the house was determined by DNA testing of descendants in the T-Arab Y DNA Haplogroup Project on Family Tree DNA and other Arab world projects.

=== Thomas Jefferson ===
A notable member of the T-M184 haplogroup is American President Thomas Jefferson (most distant known ancestor "MDKA" is Samuel Jefferson, Born 11 October 1607 in Pettistree, Suffolk, England). The Y-chromosomal complement of the Jefferson male line was studied in 1998 in an attempt to resolve the controversy over whether he had fathered the mixed-race children of his slave Sally Hemings. A 1998 DNA study of the Y chromosome in the Jefferson male line found that it matched that of a descendant of Eston Hemings, Sally Hemings' youngest son. This confirmed the body of historical evidence, and most historians believe that Jefferson had a long-term intimate liaison with Hemings for 38 years, and fathered her six children of record, four of whom lived to adulthood. In addition, the testing conclusively disproved any connection between the Hemings descendant and the Carr male line. Jefferson grandchildren had asserted in the 19th century that a Carr nephew had been the father of Hemings' children, and this had been the basis of historians' denial for 180 years. Jefferson's paternal family traced back Wales, where T is incredibly rare, as it is less than <1% throughout Britain. A couple of British males with the Jefferson surname have been found with the third president's type of T, reinforcing the likelihood that his immediate paternal ancestry was British.

Family Tree DNA, found that the Jefferson T patrilineage belongs to T-BY78550 a subclade of T-PF7444 which is likely of MENA Middle Eastern North African Origins. Spencer Wells who led The Genographic Project places his origin to Canaan

== Phylogenetic tree ==
Phylogenetic tree of haplogroup T-M184 & closely related macro-lineages (ISOGG 2015)

- LT<br />L298 (43,900 BP)
  - LT* (basal subclade)
    (LTxM184, M20; all cases without M184 or M20.)
  - TM184 (39,300‑45,100 BP)
    - T*(xL206)
      All cases without L206 or PH110
    - <br />T1L206 (26,600 BP)
      - <br />T1aM70 (19,000-30,000 BP)
        - T1a*(xL162, L131, Y11151)
          All cases without L162, L131 or Y11151
        - <br />T1a1L162 (15,400 BP)
          - <br />T1a1aL208 (14,800 BP)
            - T1a1a*(xCTS11451, Y16897)
              All cases without CTS11451 or Y16897
            - <br />T1a1a1CTS11451 (9,500 BP)
              - T1a1a1*(xY4119, Y6671)
                All cases without Y4119 or Y6671
              - <br />T1a1a1aY4119 (9,200 BP)
                - T1a1a1a*(xCTS2214)
                  All cases without CTS2214
                - <br />T1a1a1a1CTS2214 (8,900 BP)
  - L<br />M20
    - L1<br />M22
      (Mostly South Asia and Central Asia.)
    - <br />L2<br />L595
      (The highest diversity and incidence of this rare lineage is found in Europe.)

== Nomenclatural history ==
Prior to 2002, there were in academic literature at least seven naming systems for the Y-Chromosome Phylogenetic tree. This led to considerable confusion. In 2002, the major research groups came together and formed the Y-Chromosome Consortium (YCC). They published a joint paper that created a single new tree that all agreed to use. Later, a group of citizen scientists with an interest in population genetics and genetic genealogy formed a working group to create an amateur tree aiming at being above all timely. The table below brings together all of these works at the point of the landmark 2002 YCC Tree. This allows a researcher reviewing older published literature to quickly move between nomenclatures.

YCC 2002/2008 (Shorthand)	(α)	(β)	(γ)	(δ)	(ε)	(ζ)	(η)	YCC 2002 (Longhand)	YCC 2005 (Longhand)	YCC 2008 (Longhand)	YCC 2010r (Longhand)	ISOGG 2006	ISOGG 2007	ISOGG 2008	ISOGG 2009	ISOGG 2010	ISOGG 2011	ISOGG 2012	ISOGG 2013
T-M184	26	VIII	1U	25	Eu16	H5	F	K*	K	T	T	K2	K2	T	T	T	T	T	T
K-M70/T-M70	26	VIII	1U	25	Eu15	H5	F	K2	K2	T	T1	K2	K2	T	T	T	T1	T1a	T1a
T-P77	26	VIII	1U	25	Eu15	H5	F	K2	K2	T2	T1a2	K2	K2	T2	T2	T2a1	T1a1b	T1a1a1	T1a1a1

=== Original research publications ===
The following research teams per their publications were represented in the creation of the YCC Tree.

α Jobling and Tyler-Smith 2000 and Kaladjieva 2001

β Underhill 2000

γ Hammer 2001

δ Karafet 2001

ε Semino 2000

ζ Su 1999

η Capelli 2001
