= Haplogroup T =

Haplogroup T may refer to:

- Haplogroup T (mtDNA), a human mitochondrial DNA (mtDNA) haplogroup
- Haplogroup T (Y-DNA), a human Y-chromosome (Y-DNA) haplogroup
