= Pristen =

Pristen may refer to:

- Pristen (inhabited locality), name of several inhabited localities in Russia
- Pristen (moth), a genus of moth
