= Pristen (inhabited locality) =

Pristen (Russian: Пристень) is the name of several inhabited localities in Russia.

== Urban localities ==
- Pristen, Pristensky District, Kursk Oblast, a work settlement in Pristensky District, Kursk Oblast

== Rural localities ==
- Pristen, Rovensky District, Belgorod Oblast, a selo in Aydarsky Rural Okrug of Rovensky District of Belgorod Oblast
- Pristen (khutor), Shebekinsky District, Belgorod Oblast, a khutor in Shebekinsky District, Belgorod Oblast
- Pristen (selo), Shebekinsky District, Belgorod Oblast, a selo in Shebekinsky District, Belgorod Oblast
- Pristen, Valuysky District, Belgorod Oblast, a selo in Yablonovsky Rural Okrug of Valuysky District of Belgorod Oblast
- Pristen, Lgovsky District, Kursk Oblast, a village in Banishchansky Selsoviet of Lgovsky District of Kursk Oblast
