= Poda Thurpu =

Breed of cattle in southern India

- Country of origin: India

Poda Thurpu, also known as Thurpu Edlu or Poda Edlu, is a breed of cattle found chiefly in Nagarkurnool district, Telangana state in southern India. Poda is a local word meaning "spotted" or "speckled", referring to the brown or white patches on the animal's coat, while thurpu is the Telugu word for "east", which refers to the origin of the breed in eastern Telangana.

It is bred in the hilly and forested section of Nagarkurnool that forms part of the Nallamala Hills.

== History and cultural significance ==
Permits signed by the Nizam, allowing Poda Thurpu cattle to graze in the area, exist from 1836.

Poda Thurpu have traditionally been bred and kept by Lambadi and Golla families employing Chenchu herders, and have had an important role in the cultures of these communities. The herds, which mainly live in forested areas, migrate for several months every year in order to get to better grazing grounds, making it necessary for the keepers of the herds to migrate with them. Local festivals often involve ceremonies intended to bring luck to cattle herders or protection to the cattle.

== Characteristics ==
The cattle are strong and compact and characterised by a high level of endurance in dry and hot conditions. They have a white coat with brown patches or a red or brown coat with white patches, straight horns, and a convex forehead with a groove at the center. Their hoofs are strong and resistant to long exposure to either wet or dry ground. The bullocks are used mainly as draught animals.

They are also reportedly aggressive in nature, and capable of fending off predators to protect their young.

== Recognition as indigenous breed ==
Poda Thurpu was recognised by Telangana as its first officially-recognised indigenous cattle breed on 16 August 2020. It was registered at the National Bureau of Animal Genetic Resources (NBAGR) in Haryana.
