= Chenchu language =

Dravidian language of India

Chenchu
- చెంచు
- Native to: India
- Region: Andhra Pradesh (highest concentration in Kurnool district, Prakasam district, Guntur district), Telangana (Mahabubnagar district), Karnataka and Orissa
- Ethnicity: Chenchu people
- Native speakers: 26,000 (2007)
- Language family: Dravidian: Southern; Southern II; Teluguoid; Chenchu
- Writing system: Telugu alphabet

Language codes
- ISO 639-3: cde
- Glottolog: chen1255

Chenchu language (IPA: [t͡ʃent͡ʃu]) is a Dravidian language which belongs to the Telugu branch of its South-Central family. This language is spoken mostly in Andhra Pradesh and Telangana states in India by about 280,764 people (1981 census) of the Chenchu Aboriginal forests hunter-gatherer tribe. It is also called Chenchukulam, Chenchwar, Chenswar or Choncharu.

== Sources ==
- Krishnamurti, Bhadriraju (2003). The Dravidian Languages. Cambridge University Press. ISBN 978-1-139-43533-8.
- "Chenchu language". Ethnologue: Languages of the World. "Chenchu is a vulnerable Dravidian language spoken in forested regions of Andhra Pradesh and Telangana by the Chenchu tribe, classified as a Particularly Vulnerable Tribal Group."
- Zvelebil, Kamil (1990). Dravidian Linguistics: An Introduction. Pondicherry Institute of Linguistics and Culture. ISBN 978-81-8545-201-2.
