= Chenchu people =

Indigenous Scheduled Tribe from India

Chenchu
చెంచు ప్రజలు
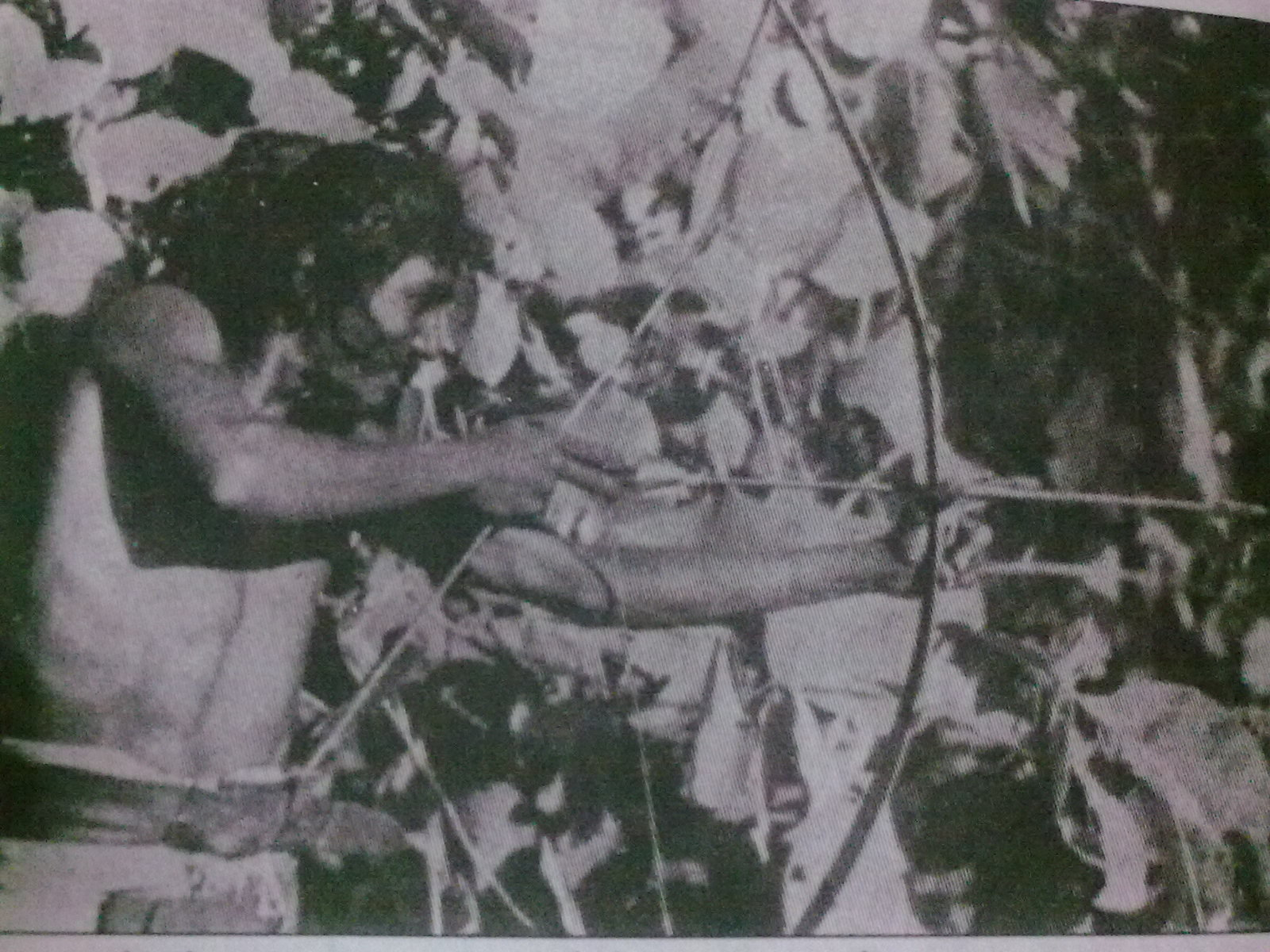
- Chenchu man hunting, Nallamala Forests, Telangana

Total population
- c. 65,000

Regions with significant populations
- Andhra Pradesh, Telangana

Languages
- Telugu, Chenchu

Religion
- Hinduism

Related ethnic groups
- Dravidian; Gondi; Telugu people

The Chenchus are a Dravidian tribe, designated as a Scheduled Tribe in the Indian states of Andhra Pradesh, Telangana, Karnataka and Odisha. They are an aboriginal tribe whose traditional way of life has been based on hunting and gathering. The Chenchus speak the Chenchu language, a member of the Dravidian language family. In general, the Chenchu relationship to non-tribal people has been largely symbiotic. Some Chenchus have continued to specialize in collecting forest products for sale to non-tribal people. Many Chenchus live in the sparse and deciduous Nallamala forest of Telangana and Andhra Pradesh.

In the Census Report, 1901, Chenchu is said to be the name by which Irulas of North Arcot and the Mysore plateau are called sometimes, and, in the Census Report, 1891, Chenchu is given as a subdivision of the Yanadis .

The Chenchus are referred to as one of the Primitive Tribal Groups that are still dependent on forests and do not cultivate land but hunt for a living. Non-tribe people living among them rent land from the Chenchus and pay a portion of the harvest. Other people also settled among them with the help of the Chenchus and learned agriculture from them, and the nomadic Banjara herders who graze their cattle in the forest have also been allotted land there. The Chenchus have responded unenthusiastically to government efforts to induce them to take up agriculture themselves.

The Chenchus are primarily Hindus. The legendary Shaiva saint Kannappa is also a Chenchu and is revered in Hindu Shaivic traditions for his deep devotion to Lord Shiva. His story is closely connected with the Srikalahasteeswara Temple in Andhra Pradesh. He is one of the 63 Nayanmars in the Saiva Siddhanta tradition and believed to be a reincarnation of Arjuna from the Mahabharata times.

== See also ==
- Christoph von Fürer-Haimendorf
- Chenchu Lakshmi, 1958 Telugu film
- Poda Thurpu
