= Pristen, Lgovsky District, Kursk Oblast =

Rural locality in Kursk Oblast, Russia

Pristen Пристень
- Village
- Interactive map of Pristen
- Location of Pristen Pristen (Kursk Oblast)
- Coordinates: 51°43′05″N 35°02′10″E
- Country: Russia
- Federal subject: Kursk Oblast
- Administrative district: Lgovsky District
- SelsovietSelsoviet: Gustomoysky

Population (2010 Census)
  - Total: 48
  - Estimate (2010): 48 (0%)

Municipal status
  - Municipal district: Lgovsky Municipal District
  - Rural settlement: Gustomoysky Selsoviet Rural Settlement
- Time zone: UTC+3 (MSK)
- Postal code: 307724
- Dialing code: +7 47140
- OKTMO ID: 38622424141
- Website: gustomoy.rkursk.ru

Pristen (Russian: Пристень) is a rural locality (Russian: деревня, lit. 'village') in Gustomoysky Selsoviet Rural Settlement, Lgovsky District, Kursk Oblast, Russia. Population: 48 (2010 census); 81 (2002 census);

== Geography ==
The village is located on the Seym River, 41 km from the Russia–Ukraine border, 79 km west of Kursk, 15 km north-west of the district center – the town Lgov, 8 km from the selsoviet center – Gustomoy.

Climate

Pristen has a warm-summer humid continental climate (Dfb in the Köppen climate classification).

== Transport ==
Pristen is located 8.5 km from the road of regional importance 38K-017 (Kursk – Lgov – Rylsk – border with Ukraine) as part of the European route E38, on the road of intermunicipal significance 38H-343 (38K-017 – Banishchi – Pristen), 13 km from the nearest railway halt 387 km (railway line 322 km – Lgov I).

The rural locality is situated 86 km from Kursk Vostochny Airport, 158 km from Belgorod International Airport and 288 km from Voronezh Peter the Great Airport.
