= Pristen, Valuysky District, Belgorod Oblast =

Pristen Пристень
- Selo
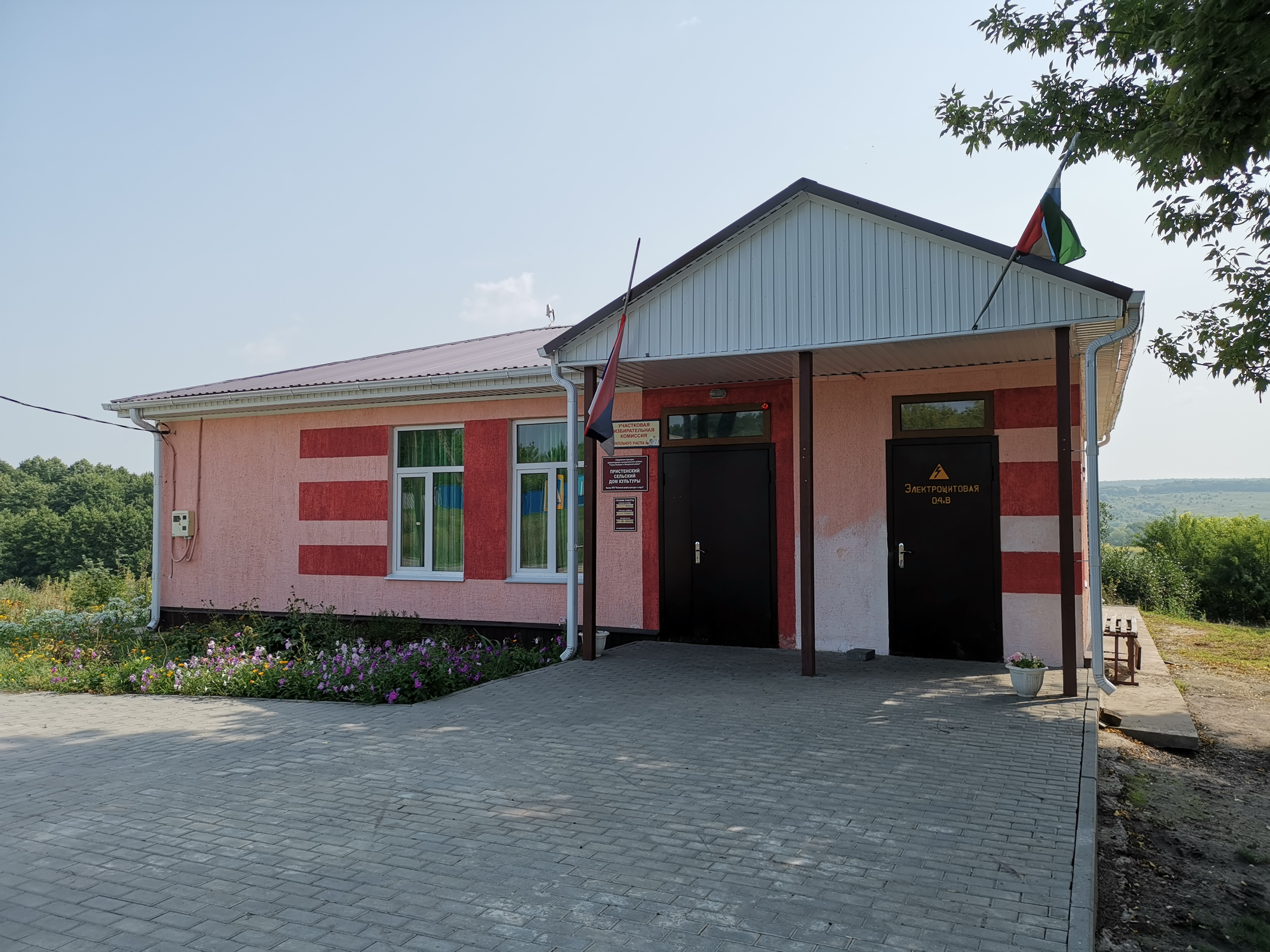

- Location within Belgorod Oblast Location within Russia
- Coordinates: 50°09′N 38°00′E
- Country: Russia
- Region: Belgorod Oblast
- District: Valuysky District
- Time zone: UTC+3:00

Pristen (Russian: Пристень) is a rural locality (a selo) in Valuysky District, Belgorod Oblast, Russia. The population was 74 as of 2010. There are 5 streets.

== Geography ==
Pristen is located 12 km southwest of Valuyki (the district's administrative centre) by road. Kurgashki is the nearest rural locality.
