= Central Marchigiano dialect =

Central Italian dialect

Marchigiano
- Marchiscià
- Native to: Italy
- Region: central Marche (provinces of Ancona, Macerata and Fermo)
- Native speakers: (undated figure of 900,000)
- Language family: Indo-European: Italic; Latino-Faliscan; Latin; Romance; Italo-Western; Italo-Dalmatian; Italo-Romance; Central Italian; Marchigiano

Language codes
- ISO 639-3: –
- Linguist List: ita-cen
- Glottolog: None
- Linguasphere: & 51-AAA-rba 51-AAA-okl & 51-AAA-rba
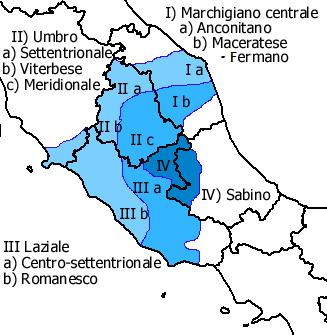

Central Marchigiano refers to a group of Romance varieties spoken in the central part of the Marche region of Italy, in an area that includes the provinces of Ancona, Macerata and Fermo. It is one of the Central Italian dialects and forms part of a continuum that also encompasses Umbrian and Latian. There are notable grammatical, lexical and idiomatic differences between Marchigiano and standard Italian, but it is considered, along with the rest of Central Italian dialects, to be fairly intelligible to a speaker of Standard Italian.

According to internal variation, Marchigiano is divided into two main areas:

- the northern area, to which belong the dialects of Ancona (Anconitano) of Osimo (Osimano), Jesi (Jesino) and Fabriano (Fabrianese) .
- the southern area, to which belong the dialects of Macerata (Maceratese), Fermo (Fermano) and that of Camerino (Camerte).

== Common features ==
Features that distinguish Marchigiano in general from Italian include:

- Apocope in words stressed on a penultimate syllable followed by /-nV/. The equivalents of Italian contadino, piccioni, and cane ('farmer, pigeons, dog') are contadì, picció, and cà.
- The presence of the ending -aro or -aru (from Latin -ārium) where Italian instead has -aio.
- The fact that the general masculine singular ending in nouns and adjectives may be /u/, rather than the /o/ found in Italian.
- The vocalization of older /ʎʎ/. The equivalent to Italian figlio may be fiio, fiiu, or fio [ˈfi.o].
- The loss of /-re/ in infinitives (also found in Tuscan). The equivalents of Italian amare, mettere, and morire ('love, put, die) are amà, mette, and morì.
- The change of older /ndʒ/ to /ɲɲ/, such that magnemo 'we eat' corresponds to Italian mangiamo.
- Isomorphism of certain third-person both plural and singular verb endings, such that ama may mean either 'he/she/it loves' or 'they love'.

The verbs meaning 'be' and 'have' inflect as follows in the present indicative:

Anconitano	Maceratese	Italian	Translation
so	so	sono	I am
sei (sai)	ssi	sei	you are
è	adè	è	he/she/it is
semo	simo	siamo	we are
sé	sete	siete	you (plural) are
è(-ne)	adè	sono	they are

Anconitano	Maceratese	Italian	Translation
ciò	ciò	ho	I have
ciài	ci(ài)	hai	you have
cià	cià	ha	he/she/it has
ciavémo	ciaìmo	abbiamo	we have
ciavé	ciaéte	avete	you (plural) have
cià(-ne)	cià	hanno	they have

== Features of the three areas ==
=== Ancona dialect ===
The Ancona dialect is spoken only in Ancona and has only recently spread its influence elsewhere (Falconara, Osimo, Jesi, Chiaravalle, Porto Recanati, Loreto and Senigallia). Of the Marchigiano varieties, it is the one that shows the most Gallo-Italic traits. For instance, the masculine singular definite article is always el, without anything comparable to the Italian variation, according to phonetic context, between il and lo. Only the speakers from towns which are closer to Macerata (Osimo, Castelfidardo, Loreto, Porto Recanati) use the form lo as in Italian. These cities also undergo other influences from the Macerata dialect, due to proximity.

=== Fabriano dialect ===
The Fabriano dialect is spoken in Fabriano (closer to Umbria) and nearby towns. Rhotacism of /l/ occurs in this dialect, such that the local equivalents of Italian calza 'sock' and fulmine 'lightning' are carza and furmine.

=== Macerata-Fermo dialect ===
The Macerata-Fermo dialect is spoken in the provinces of Macerata and Fermo. Its speakers use lu (masculine singular) and lo (neuter singular) as definite articles. Notable features are rhotacism of /l/ and various assimilations that are absent from Italian:

Sound change	Maceratese word	Italian counterpart	Translation
/nd/ > /nn/	mettenno	mettendo	putting
/mb/ > /mm/	gamma	gamba	leg
/nt/ > /nd/	pianda	pianta	plant
/mp/ > /mb/	cambu	campo	field
/ld/ > /ll/	callu	caldo	hot

== Vocabulary ==
The following is a list of Marchigian words; note that the Anconitan forms do not show gemination (babu, ciambòtu, nèrtu, etc.)

- ammò (adv. by this time; now); Anconitano: adè
- babbo (n. dad; father)
- bardasciu or vardasciu (n. boy; child); Anconitano: fiòlo
- bedollu or bidullu (n. poplar)
- brenciu or vrenciu (adj. bitter; sour)
- ciambottu or ciammottu (n. toad/clumsy)
- cuscì (adv. in this way)
- grannola (n. hail)
- (a)lluccà (vb. to shout; to scream); Anconitano: sgagià
- nnertu (adj. thick)
- rosciu or rusciu (adj. red)
- sbisgià or sbiscià (vb. to slide)
- scì (adv. yes)
- jèmmete (n. cliff)
- mata (n. mud)

== See also ==
- Central Italian dialects
- Tuscan
- Umbria
- Sabino dialect
- Marche

== Notes ==
 _{
}
