= Languages of Greece =

- Official: Greek (Demotic)
- Regional: Cretan, Cappadocian, Pontic, Maniot, Thracian, Tsakonian, Yevanic
- Minority: Albanian, Turkish, Russian, Romani, Bulgarian, Macedonian, Armenian, Aromanian
- Foreign: English (51%); Italian (23%); German (8.5%); French (8%)
- Signed: Greek Sign Language
- Keyboard layout: Greek keyboard
- Source: European Commission

The official language of Greece is Greek, spoken by 99% of the population. In addition, a number of non-official, minority languages and some Greek dialects are spoken as well. The most common foreign languages learned by Greeks are English, German, French and Italian.

== Modern Greek ==
The distribution of major modern Greek dialect areas.

Modern Greek language (Νεοελληνική γλώσσα) is the only official language of the Hellenic Republic, and is spoken by some 99.5% of the population — about 11,100,000 people (though not necessarily as a first language). Standard Modern Greek is the officially used standard, but there are several non-official dialects and distinct Hellenic languages spoken as well. Regional spoken dialects exist side by side with learned, archaic written forms. All surviving forms of modern Greek, except the Tsakonian language, are descendants of the common supra-regional (koiné) as it was spoken in late antiquity. As such, they can ultimately be classified as descendants of Attic Greek, the dialect spoken in and around Athens in the classical era. Tsakonian, an isolated dialect spoken today by a dwindling community in the Peloponnese, is a descendant of the ancient Doric dialect. Some other dialects have preserved elements of various ancient non-Attic dialects, but Attic Koine is nevertheless regarded by most scholars as the principal source of all of them.

=== Cappadocian Greek ===
Cappadocian Greek (Καππαδοκικά) is a Hellenic language originally spoken in Cappadocia and since the 1920s spoken in Greece. It has very few speakers and was previously thought to be extinct. The Cappadocians rapidly shifted to Standard Modern Greek and their language was thought to be extinct since the 1960s.

=== Cretan Greek ===
Cretan Greek is spoken by more than 500,000 people on the island of Crete, as well as in the Greek Diaspora. It is rarely used in written language, and differs much less from Standard Greek than other varieties. The Cretan dialect is spoken by the majority of the Cretan Greeks on the island of Crete, as well as by several thousand Cretans who have settled in major Greek cities, notably in Athens, and in areas settled by Ottoman-era Cretan Greek Muslims (the so-called Cretan Turks), such as the town of Al-Hamidiyah in Syria.

=== Cypriot Greek ===
Cypriot Greek (Κυπριακή διάλεκτος) is spoken by Greek Cypriots. In Cyprus about 659,115 (in 2011) spoke the language, and many of them settled in Greek cities. The language is prevalent in many other parts of the world including Australia, Canada and the Americas. The total speakers are about 1.20 million people.

=== Maniot Greek ===
The Maniot Greek dialect (Μανιάτικη διάλεκτος) of the local area of Mani.

=== Pontic Greek ===
Pontic Greek (Ποντιακή διάλεκτος) is a Hellenic language originally spoken in Pontus and by Caucasus Greeks in the South Caucasus region, although now mostly spoken in Greece by some 500,000 people. The linguistic lineage of Pontic Greek stems from Ionic Greek via Koine and Byzantine Greek

=== Thracian Greek ===
The Thracian Greek dialect is spoken mainly in Western Thrace and by the Greek minority in other areas of Thrace outside the Greek borders, and by greek refugees who came from East Thrace in Macedonia mainly

=== Sarakatsanika ===
An archaic dialect of Greek spoken by the Sarakatsani of Greek Macedonia and elsewhere in Northern Greece, a traditionally transhumant, clan-based community of mountain shepherds.

=== Tsakonian Greek ===
The little-spoken Tsakonian language (Τσακωνική διάλεκτος) is used by some in the Tsakonia region of Peloponnese. The language is split into three dialects: Northern, Southern, and Propontis. The language is spoken by 1,200 people.

=== Yevanic Greek ===
A Jewish dialect of Greek (Ρωμανιώτικη διάλεκτος) spoken by the Romaniotes, Yevanic is almost completely extinct today. There are a total of roughly 50 speakers, around 35 of whom now reside in Israel. The language may still be used by some elderly Romaniotes in Ioannina.

== Greek Sign Language ==
Greek Sign Language (Ελληνική Νοηματική Γλώσσα) is the sign language of the Greek deaf community. It has been legally recognised as the official language of the Deaf Community in Greece and is estimated to be used by about 42,000 signers (12,000 children and 30,000 active adult users) in 1986.

== Minority languages ==
Regions with a traditional presence of languages other than Greek. Greek is today spoken as the dominant language throughout the country.

=== Albanian ===
Since the 1990s, large numbers of Albanian immigrants have arrived in Greece, forming the largest immigrant group (443,550 in the 2001 census). Due to immigration, Albanian is considered as one of the widely spoken foreign languages in the country.

==== Arvanitika ====
Unlike the recent immigrants from Albania, the Arvanites are a centuries-old local Albanian-speaking Greek community living in parts of Greece especially in the south. Their language, now in danger of extinction, is known as Arvanitika. Their number has been estimated as between 30,000 and 140,000.

=== Armenian ===
Of the 35,000 Armenians in Greece today, some 20,000 speak the language.

=== Aromanian ===
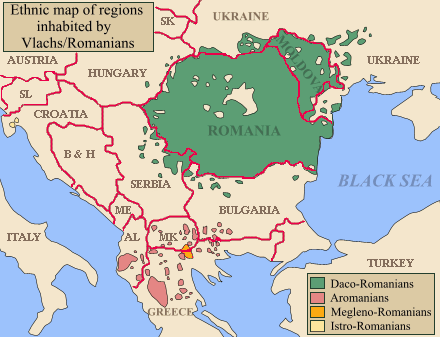
The distribution of Romanians and Vlachs in the Balkans (Aromanians marked in red).

The Aromanians, also known as Vlachs, are a population group linguistically related to Romanians. Aromanian is an Eastern Romance language. It is spoken by the around 250,000 Aromanians in Greece.

==== Megleno-Romanian ====
Megleno-Romanian is a Romance language spoken in Greece and North Macedonia. There are roughly 2,500 speakers in Greece.

=== Slavic dialects ===
==== Bulgarian and Macedonian ====
In Greece, Slavic dialects heteronomous with standard Bulgarian and Macedonian are spoken; however, the speakers do not all identify their language with their national identity. Some historians consider the local Macedonian dialect as a Bulgarian dialect. Some prefer to identify as dopii and their dialect as dopia which mean local or indigenous in Greek.

According to Riki van Boeschoten, the Slavic dialects of Greek Macedonia are divided into three main dialects (Eastern, Central and Western), of which the Eastern dialect used in the areas of Serres and Drama is closer to Bulgarian, while the Central dialect used in the area between Edessa and Salonica is an intermediate between Macedonian and Bulgarian. In addition, there are an estimated 30,000 native speakers of Bulgarian in Western Thrace according to Ethnologue, where it is referred to as Pomak.

=== Ladino ===
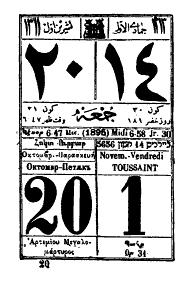
1896 calendar from Thessaloniki written in Ottoman Turkish, Armenian, Greek, Bulgarian, Ladino, and French.

Ladino, the Judeo-Spanish language, was traditionally spoken by the Sephardic community in Greece, particularly in the city of Thessaloniki, where, at their peak percentage, they made up 56% of the population. However, many of Greece's Jews were murdered in World War II, and a large number emigrated to Israel after 1948. It is maintained today by between 2,000 and 8,000 people in Greece.

=== Romani ===
In the population of 200,000 to 300,000 Roma, or Gypsy, people in Greece today, the Romani language is spoken widely. Romani is an Indo-Aryan language similar to many Indian languages, due to the origins of the Roma people in northern India. The dialect spoken in Greece (as well as in Bulgaria, Albania, North Macedonia, Moldova, Montenegro, Serbia, Romania, parts of Turkey, and Ukraine) is known as Balkan Romani. There are 160,000 Romani speakers in Greece today (90% of the Roma population).

=== Russian ===
Russian has become widely spoken in Greece, particularly in Greek Macedonia and other parts of Northern Greece, mainly by wealthy Russians settled in Greece and Russian speaking economic migrants who went there in the 1990s. Russian is also spoken as a second or third language by many Georgians and Pontic Greeks from Georgia, Ukraine, and Russia who settled in Greece in large numbers in the same period. The older generation of Caucasus Greeks settled mainly in Salonika, Kilkis and elsewhere in Central Macedonia in circa 1920 also speak Russian as a second language, as do most Greeks who had settled in Czechoslovakia, the USSR, and other Eastern Bloc states following the Greek Civil War, returning to Greece mainly in the early 1990s.

=== Turkish ===
Turkish is one of the most widely spoken minority languages in Greece today, with approximately 50,000 to 60,000 speakers. Turkish sources claim that as many as 128,000 people consist the minority group, but this is unlikely. According to Ethnologue, in 2014 there were 40,000 Turkish speakers in Greece, including 9,700 native speakers.

These are usually defined as Western Thrace Turks. Traditionally, there were many more Turkish speakers in Greece, due to the long period of Ottoman rule. But after the exchange of populations between Greece and Turkey, a much smaller number remain, with even Turkish-speaking Greek Muslims forcibly expatriated to Turkey in 1923. The Turkish-speaking population of Greece is mainly concentrated in the region of East Macedonia and Thrace. Turkish speakers also make up a large part of Greece's Muslim minority.

=== Greco-Turkic or Urum ===
This refers to the hybrid Greco-Turkish dialect spoken by the so-called Urums or those who define themselves as Greek from the Tsalka (mainly Pontians) region of central Georgia and also to the Greco-Tatar dialect spoken by ethnic Greeks in Ukraine and the Crimea. Most speakers of Urum now live in mainly Northern Greece, having left Georgia in the 1990s, although many of those from Crimea and southeastern Ukraine are still living in these areas.

=== Georgian ===
Georgian is widely spoken particularly in Thessaloniki and other parts of Greek Macedonia by economic migrants who settled in Greece in the 1990s. As well as ethnic Georgians, these include those defined as Caucasus Greeks or ethnic Greeks in Georgia, from especially the south of the country and the Tsalka region in the centre.
