= Carl Borgmann =

American engineer and educator (1905–1998)

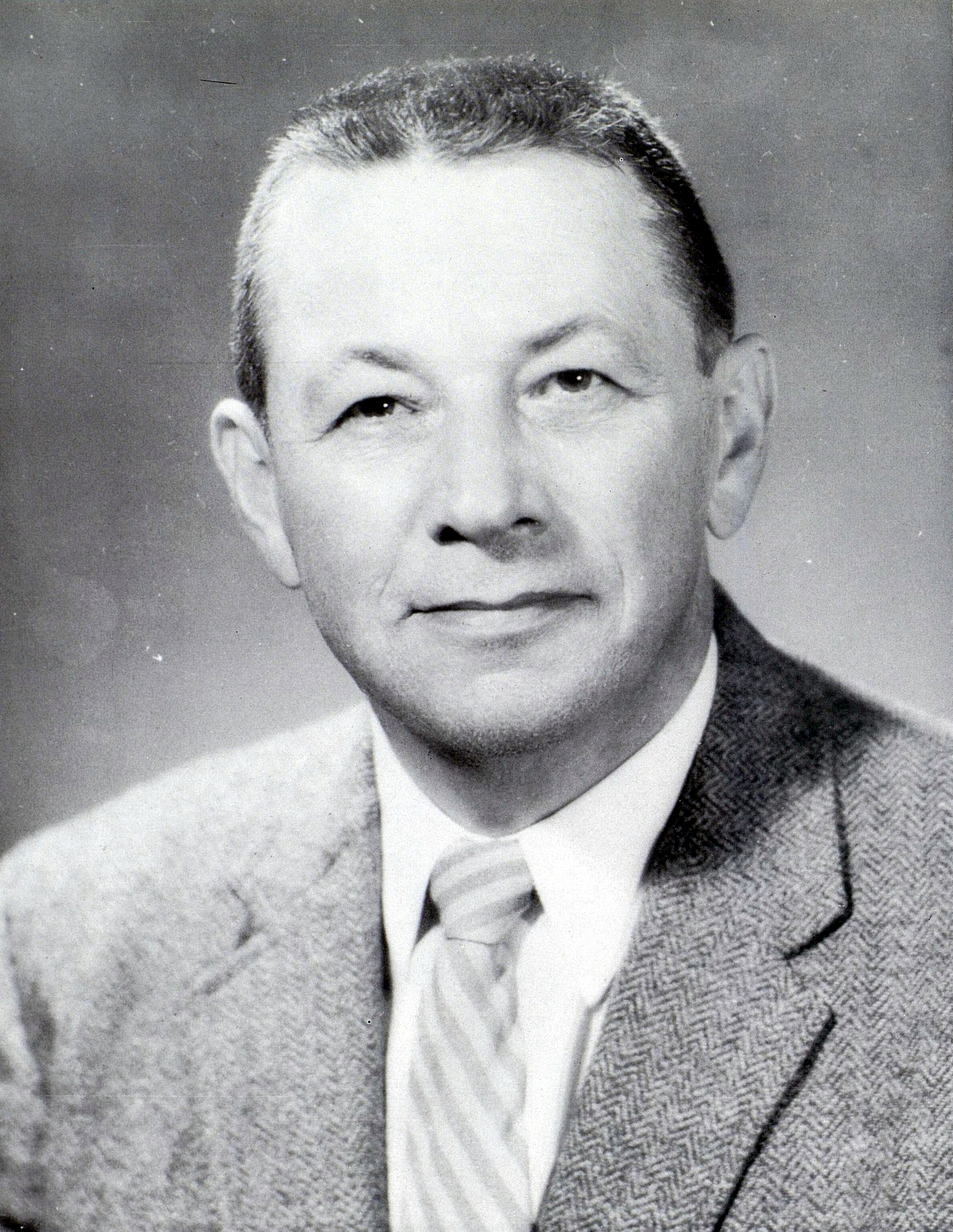
- Borgmann in 1958
- Born: June 3, 1905; Mount Washington, Missouri, US
- Died: November 29, 1998 (aged 93); Livermore, Colorado, US
- Education: University of Colorado Boulder (BS, MS); University of Cambridge (PhD)
- Scientific career
- Fields: Chemical engineering
- Workplaces: Bell Labs; University of North Carolina; University of Nebraska; University of Vermont; Ford Foundation; University of Colorado
- Thesis: Some Properties of the Metallic State

Carl Williams Borgmann (June 3, 1905 – November 29, 1998) was an American chemical engineer, research scientist, academic administrator at the University of Colorado Boulder and the University of Nebraska, sixteenth president of the University of Vermont (UVM), and director of science and engineering for the Ford Foundation. During the research phase of his career, Borgmann studied both metal corrosion and fructose extraction. He took an interest in astronomy and was friends with astronomers Joe Pawsey and Walt Roberts.

As president of UVM, Borgmann brought a Midwestern approach to the democratization of education, running a successful campaign that raised state funds and cut the cost of tuition almost in half for resident students, who in the early 1950s were paying the highest in-state tuition in the country. McCarthyism was at its height in the United States at the time, and the Novikoff Affair became a major controversy at UVM regarding academic freedom during his presidency.

Borgmann was recruited by the Ford Foundation during the Sputnik crisis and left UVM to serve as its director, helping to advance science and technology for Western nations by disbursing funds in the areas of engineering, atmospheric science, and space science. He was an early proponent of anthropogenic climate change and wrote several speeches and articles focusing on the importance of nature conservation towards the end of his career.

== Early life and education ==
Borgmann was born on June 3, 1905, in Mount Washington, Missouri, but was raised in Evergreen, Colorado. He was a student at Denver West High School and later did his undergraduate work at the University of Colorado Boulder (BS, 1927; MS, 1931). After receiving his Bachelor of Science, he spent four years at Bell Labs in New York as a research chemist. Borgmann was awarded a fellowship to study in Norway and Sweden by The American-Scandinavian Foundation in May 1931.

He and his wife sailed to England in late September of that same year, where he began studying abroad at the University of Cambridge in pursuit of "the mechanism of the corrosion of zinc". While studying in England, Borgmann became lifelong friends with fellow student and Australian radio astronomer Joseph L. Pawsey. Borgmann obtained his doctorate in chemical engineering (PhD, 1934) from Cambridge with his dissertation on Some Properties of the Metallic State. He documented his experience in an essay titled "A Colorado Engineer at Cambridge", an article published for his alma mater. Borgmann continued his studies as a postdoctoral fellow at the Karolinska Institute and the Metallographic Institute (Metallografiska institutet) in Stockholm, Sweden, and at the Norwegian Institute of Technology in Trondheim, Norway.

== Academic career ==
Borgmann began lecturing at the University of North Carolina as an assistant professor of chemical engineering in 1934. The National Tube Company, then a subsidiary of U.S. Steel, hired him as a research scientist in 1937. Borgmann started working for the University of Colorado Boulder (CU Boulder) as head of their chemical engineering department and later their Engineering Experiment Station from 1938 to 1946. While at CU Boulder, he received a grant from the Sugar Research Foundation. He supervised a pilot project that used ion-exchange to extract fructose from sugar in large quantities.

At this time, Borgmann struck up a friendship with astronomer and atmospheric physicist Walt Roberts. During World War II, Borgmann was part of the Chemical Warfare Service and was on the National War Labor Board. In 1947, he left CU Boulder to become dean of faculties at the University of Nebraska (NU), where he stayed until 1951. While at NU, Borgmann was awarded a grant by the Research Corporation to investigate how environmental conditions affect the "cathodic polarization of common metals and alloys".

He left NU to become the sixteenth president of the University of Vermont (UVM) in 1952, succeeding William S. Carlson in the role and serving for six years. During his presidency, Borgmann cut tuition costs for students, helped to rewrite the university charter, raised new funding, and made plans for the future development of the university. When Borgmann arrived, the school had multiple charters and was in a legal grey zone somewhere between a private and a public university due to the historical merge of the Vermont Agricultural College and UVM.

Borgmann soon realized that his assumption that UVM was a public school was wrong. Most people in Vermont, Borgmann discovered, erroneously believed UVM was a private school. Because of this confusion and its multiple charters, the school lacked significant state funding. Journalist Tom Slayton notes that when Borgmann began his presidency, in-state resident tuition at the Colleges of Arts and Sciences and Engineering was $625 ($7,578 in 2025), the same amount paid by students out of state. At the time, this was considered the "highest in-state tuition then charged by any state university in the United States".

A culture clash of sorts ensued. Borgnmann discovered that UVM was fundraising as both a private and a public university, depending on the departments and the benefactors, and both the students and the faculty were losing out. This situation came about in part due to the culture of the East Coast in general, and New England in particular. Their approach to education stressed the exclusivity and high cost of private schools. Borgmann, on the other hand, came from the Midwestern United States, where its culture stressed the primacy of low cost, high quality public universities that were available to anyone who had the aptitude.

Borgmann's goal as an "educational populist" was to lower tuition costs for Vermont residents, raise the salaries of UVM faculty, and legitimize UVM as a public state university that opened up educational opportunities for all Vermonters. Borgmann succeeded in spite of the opposition from a member of the financial community who wanted UVM to be an exclusive private school. It took several years and the passage of a UVM bill through the State House and Senate in March 1955, but Borgmann was able to get the state to fund the school and with that appropriation cut tuition "nearly in half" for the majority of in-state students.

In the era of McCarthyism, one major controversy, the Novikoff Affair, occurred during his presidency. Cancer researcher Alex B. Novikoff was targeted as a former Communist and asked to testify in front of a U.S. Senate subcommittee and name other suspected Communists. Novikoff refused and was forced to leave the university by a review board. Catholic bishop Robert Francis Joyce, the first clergyman elected as a trustee at the university, cast the only dissenting vote. Novikoff spent the rest of his career at the Albert Einstein College of Medicine.

In 1983, thirty years after Novikoff was dismissed, the University of Vermont issued an apology. Novikoff later recalled that Borgmann "did not press him to testify" at the time. David R. Holmes, an associate professor of education at UVM, believed that Governor Lee E. Emerson, along with the prevailing public opinion of the time, played an influential role in forcing Borgmann and the trustees to dismiss Novikoff under the cloud of anti-communism. Decades later, Holmes writes that Novikoff came to believe that "Borgmann was a fine human being who had been unprepared to handle the situation". Holmes argues that Borgmann's professional reputation took a major hit from the Novikoff Affair and "never fully recovered".

Borgmann announced his resignation suddenly in October 1957 when he accepted an offer to direct the science and engineering division at the Ford Foundation. He continued his duties at the university until June 1958. He was succeeded in his role as president of the university by John T. Fey, a former law clerk for the Warren Court. Borgmann's departure ended a seventeen-year period of scientific leadership in the presidency at UVM from 1941 to 1958, beginning with physicist John S. Millis and geologist William S. Carlson.

== Ford Foundation ==
Henry Heald, the first president of the Ford Foundation, recruited Borgmann in 1957 as the new program director for science and engineering. Borgmann came to the Foundation during the Sputnik crisis when the Soviet Union launched the world's first artificial satellite and Western nations were caught on the back foot. President Heald spoke directly to the Sputnik crisis and concerns about education within the opening pages of the Ford Foundation Annual Report for 1958, referring to the problem as "The World Imbalance in Education". With $500 million ($5.92 billion in 2025) available to disburse given the crisis, the Ford Foundation began to direct the funds towards training new engineers at various universities. Engineering departments at the Massachusetts Institute of Technology, the Case Institute of Technology, and the University of Toronto received tens of millions from the Foundation.

Borgmann began working at the Ford Foundation in July 1958 having wrapped up the last of his duties at the University of Vermont. One of the first major grant programs Borgmann funded was for the atmospheric sciences in 1959, allocating approximately $1.2 million ($13 million in 2025) to nine universities to "increase the number of advanced research scientists in meteorology, oceanography, and plasma physics."

Borgmann's "personal interest" in astronomy and friendships with various astronomers led in part to increased funding for space science. From 1959 to 1967, Borgmann approved the initial seed funding for the European Southern Observatory (ESO), the Yale-Columbia Southern Hemisphere Astrograph, the CSIRO for Australian Radio-heliograph in Culgoora in New South Wales, and the Association of Universities for Research in Astronomy (AURA). The Foundation also funded the Cerro Tololo Inter-American Observatory. According to astronomer Frank K. Edmondson, Ford Foundation grants were the "catalyst" that led to the creation of the ESO. After eight years as director, Borgmann transitioned to a new role in the organization from 1966 to 1970 as science and engineering advisor to the office of the president. He returned to the University of Colorado as dean of the graduate school in 1972 for one year.

== Climate change and nature conservation ==
Borgmann gave a commencement address to the graduating class at the University of Tennessee on August 26, 1965. In the address, he discussed the risks of anthropogenic climate change before they became more widely known by the public. The speech, titled "Man's Use of Science: Some Deferred Costs", was cited in the Third Proceedings of the Society of Engineering Science (SES) at their technical meeting at the University of California, Davis, in November of that same year. Excerpts from the speech were published in the conservation magazines Massachusetts Audubon and Wyoming Wildlife in 1966.

At the time of Borgmann's original warning, the amount of carbon dioxide in the atmosphere was only at 320 parts per million. In his speech, Borgmann laid out the problem to the students: "But even if we could afford devices which allowed for our fuels to be completely burned to water and carbon dioxide, another change in our environment is likely. Carbon dioxide, as it becomes a greater proportion of the atmosphere, behaves somewhat like the glass of a greenhouse. It traps heat from the sun, and climatic change results – not overnight, but slowly and surely. This process appears to be already under way, in fact."

Borgmann followed up the original speech with a second one in February 1968 at the Waldorf Astoria in New York tackling themes related to nature conservation. Titled "A Challenging Future", Borgmann gave the speech to members of The Minerals, Metals & Materials Society as part of the annual meeting of the American Institute of Mining, Metallurgical and Petroleum Engineers. In the speech, he asks the metallurgical engineers to "seek ways of disposing of any wastes still left so that they add a minimum of cost to the next user of the air, the water, the soil and the landscape." Again, pursuing the same idea, Borgmann collaborated with program officer Thomas E. Cooney of the Ford Foundation in the 1973 article "The Conservation of Matter—Automotive Style", published in the journal Biological Conservation.

Climate historian Marc Hudson believes Borgmann was drawing on multiple sources, including a 1963 workshop held by the Conservation Foundation, which was also funded by the Ford Foundation, as well as a 1964 Popular Mechanics article on the same topic. President Lyndon Johnson had given a similar address to Congress several months earlier in February 1965. In that speech, Johnson spoke about the "steady increase in carbon dioxide from the burning of fossil fuels". Almost a decade earlier, Roger Revelle raised the same issue in his testimony before the House Committee on Appropriations in 1956. The topic had been circulating in the scientific community for some time before Borgmann made his remarks so he was likely aware of the background.

== Personal life ==
He married Mabel Dorothy Gaiser in Denver in September 1930. They had five children, including four daughters and one son. His daughter, Martha Crago, is a linguist, researcher, and professor at McGill University. She was appointed as a Member of the Order of Canada. Borgmann's wife Mabel died in 1993 and a scholarship fund was later set up in her name. That same year, CU Boulder honored Borgmann by naming the School of Engineering computer lab after him. He also received a total of five honorary degrees. Borgmann later died at the age of 93 on November 29, 1998, in Livermore, Colorado. A memorial was held in his honor at CU Boulder a month later.

== Legacy ==
When Borgmann arrived as president of the University of Vermont (UVM) in late 1952, students were paying the highest in-state tuition in the country. When he left as president in 1958, he had succeeded in cutting tuition costs for students almost in half. Borgmann attributed his work on the successful passage of the 1955 UVM charter bill as a continuing part of fulfilling the vision of Vermont Senator Justin Smith Morrill of making public education available to all eligible Vermonters.

In just five years time, Borgmann helped to revise the original university charter to increase state funding; expanded the advanced degree programs of the Graduate College; doubled the number of research grants; helped to construct new women's dormitories; planned for a new library, gymnasium, and medical college; raised faculty salaries; and expanded the scope and offering of the school.

UVM professor Betty Bandel regarded Borgmann as "the most outstanding president" she had ever encountered at the university. Slayton notes that Borgmann was not especially known for his public speaking skills, but rather for his candor. UVM instructor George Richard Hopwood believed it was his direct and open style that led Borgmann to earn the trust of others. Historian Tom Bassett recalled that unlike other administrators, Borgmann was remembered as "persuasive, personable, [and] warmly human."

== Selected work ==
- "A Colorado Engineer at Cambridge" (1933)
- "Man's Use of Science: Some Deferred Costs" (1965)
- "A Challenging Future" (1968)
- Mineral Engineering Education in the West (1969)
- "The Conservation of Matter—Automotive style" (1973)
