= AED (non-profit) =

US-based nonprofit organization (1961–2011)

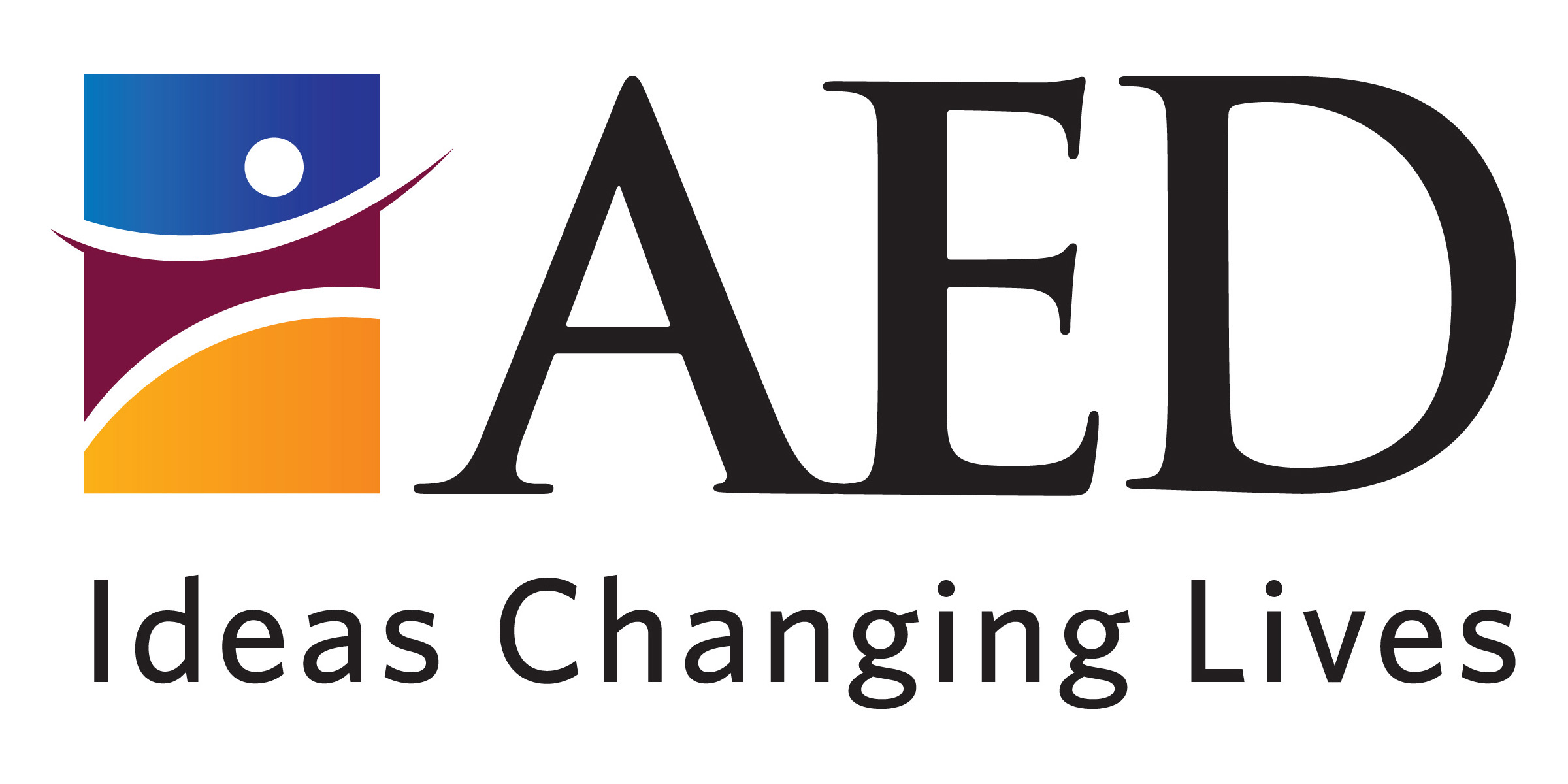
- Type: Nonprofit organization
- Founded: Washington, USA (1961)
- Founder: Alvin C. Eurich, Sidney Tickton
- Defunct: 2011
- Headquarters: Washington, D.C.
- Key people: Gregory R. Niblett (CEO) & (President)
- Website: www.aed.org

AED, formerly the Academy for Educational Development (1961 to 2011), was a 501(c)(3) nonprofit organization that focused on education, health and economic development for the "least advantaged in the United States and developing countries throughout the world." AED operated more than 250 programs in the United States and in 150 other countries.

== History and scope ==
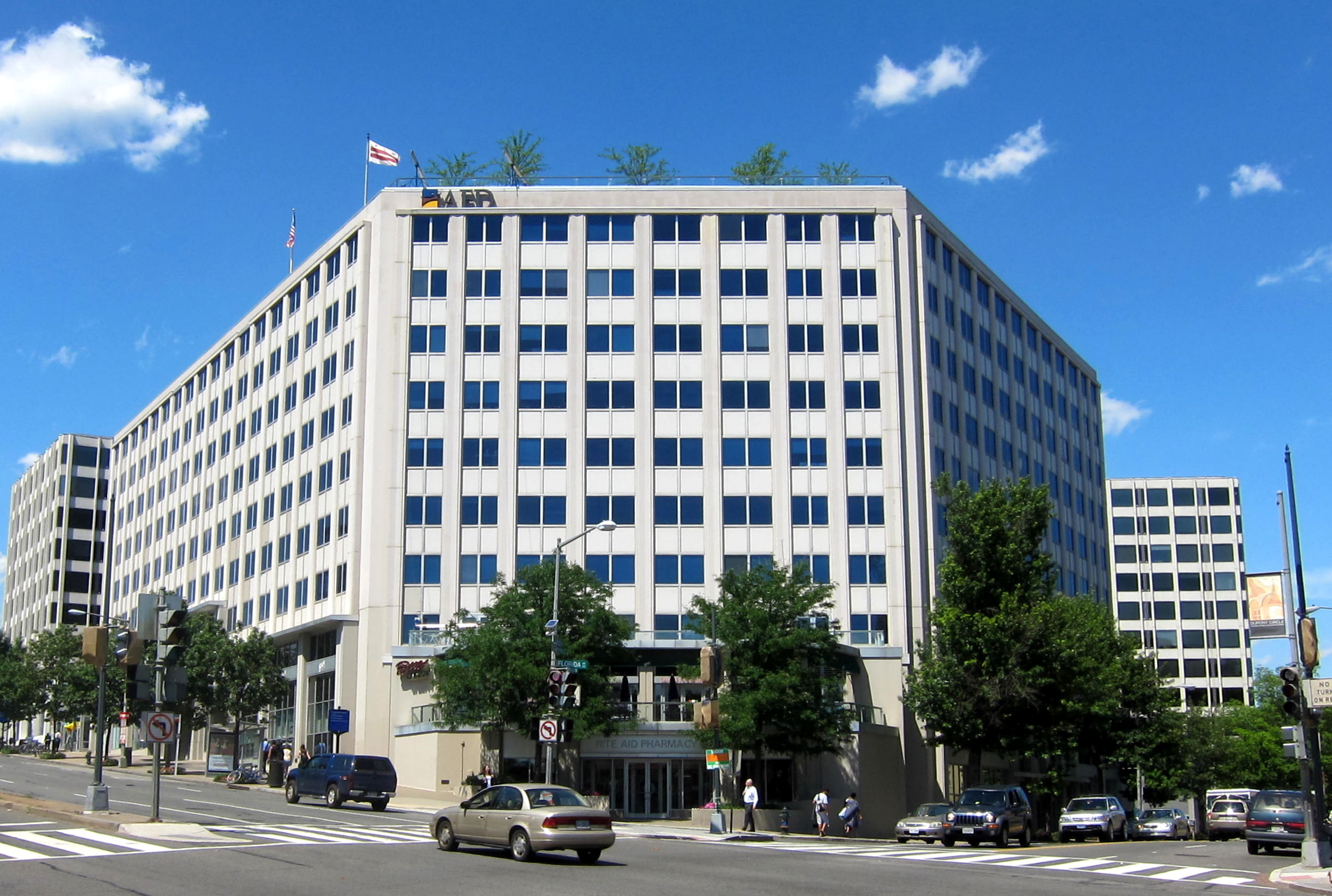
AED headquarters in Washington, D.C.

AED was founded in 1961 by Alvin C. Eurich and Sidney Tickton. Originally focused on providing technical assistance related to higher education management in the United States, AED expanded into instructional technology, education reform, and civil society support in the US and around the world. It also focused on promoting health in developing countries through environmental communication, social marketing and other disciplines.

AED worked throughout the United States and in 167 countries. AED operated more than 250 programs to help people improve their lives through better education, health, and economic opportunities. It was a member of the U.S. Global Leadership Coalition.

== Programs ==
AED had five main program areas: global health, population, and nutrition; global learning; leadership and institutional development; social change; and U.S. education and workforce development. Each group had between four and seven centers.

AED was one of six partnership support organizations chosen by the New York City Department of Education to provide New York City public schools with technical assistance in a variety of areas.

AED's Center for Academic Partnerships stated aim was to work with educational institutions and individuals in the United States and around the world to "strengthen and diversify academic exchanges and educational linkages." This Center facilitated international students' study in the United States, American students' study abroad and service learning abroad through the AED Development Fellows Program, as well as faculty and professional exchanges and short term institutes.

On July 25, 2009, Iraqi Prime Minister Nouri al-Maliki announced plans to send up to 10,000 Iraqi students per year to colleges in the United States, United Kingdom, Canada and Australia through 2014 as a part of the Iraq Education Initiative, for which AED will provide advice and support.

Other programs included the AED Center for Youth Development and Policy Research, which began the Promising Practices in Afterschool System in 1999 with funding from the Charles Stewart Mott Foundation. AED's Middle Start program provided research-based professional development programs that invigorate teaching and learning resulting in improved rigor, equity, and achievement. The National Security Education Program David L. Boren Fellowships for graduate students, offered by George Washington University, were provided by AED. GreenCOM, sponsored by AED, is the strategic environmental communication project of the U.S. Agency for International Development, providing services to USAID missions and environmental and agricultural program managers worldwide. AED was a major partner in USAID's "DOT-COM Alliance," leading the dot-ORG program (one of the three programs).

=== NICHCY ===
The National Dissemination Center for Children with Disabilities (NICHCY, an acronym derived from its original name, National Information Center for Handicapped Children and Youth) operated as a national centralized information resource on disabilities and special education for children and youth ages birth through 22 years, sponsored by the U.S. Department of Education. It collected, organized, and disseminated current and accurate research-based information about childhood disability and special education. The center also disseminated information about the Individuals with Disabilities Education Act, the nation's special education law and the No Child Left Behind Act, the nation's general education law. NICHCY focused on research, information dissemination, and providing quality information on teaching and learning. It was de-funded by the U.S. Department of Education in 2013. Its website remained available until September 2014, and its resources moved to the Center for Parent Information and Resources.

== Controversy ==
=== Executive compensation ===
In 2009, AED drew criticism when it was revealed that then-President Stephen Moseley was paid US$879,530 in total compensation in 2007. Moseley said his 2007 compensation, which included "catch-up" payments into an executive pension fund for prior years, was "in line" with competitors. Moseley announced his January 2011 retirement in November 2010.

=== USAID suspension ===
In December 2010, the U.S. Agency for International Development, or USAID, suspended AED from being awarded new federal service contracts from USAID for 12 to 18 months due to evidence of "serious corporate misconduct" revealed after investigations of the agency's expenditures in Pakistan and Afghanistan. At that time AED had 65 contracts and grants through USAID totaling $640 million.

=== Settlement agreement with US government ===
On June 30, 2011, AED signed a settlement with the U.S. Department of Justice in which it agreed to pay more than $5 million to settle false claims act allegations. According to the U.S. Government, AED had failed to provide proper oversight and management of USAID projects in the semi-autonomous tribal regions of Pakistan and parts of Afghanistan. As a result, the U.S. Government received substandard service and products at inflated prices. The Department of Justice also alleged that executives at the Washington, D.C., office of AED did not properly disclose information about overcharges and other financial mismanagement.

=== Transfer of all AED programs to FHI 360 ===
Concurrent with the settlement agreement AED executed a transfer of virtually all of its existing programs and employees to another USAID contractor NGO, Family Health International. The AED programs combined with FHI to create a new entity, FHI 360. With that, AED effectively ceased to exist.
