= Vermont Life =

Magazine

- Categories: Regional magazines
- Frequency: Quarterly
- Founded: 1946
- Final issue: Summer 2018
- Company: State of Vermont
- Country: United States
- Based in: Montpelier, Vermont
- Language: English
- Website: vermontlife.com
- ISSN: 0042-417X

Vermont Life was a quarterly regional magazine focusing on the Vermont lifestyle. It was published by the State of Vermont and was read by Vermont residents and those who live outside the state. The headquarters was in Montpelier. It was known for its scenic photography and articles about Vermont's food/agriculture, arts, outdoor recreation and entrepreneurs. In addition to the quarterly print publication, Vermont Life published two websites, produced a digital version of the magazine, a line of printed calendars, note-cards, and worked with other State of Vermont agencies and organizations on branding Vermont.

== History ==
The first issue of Vermont Life was published in 1946 as a marketing tool for the State of Vermont. The state financially supported the magazine until it became profitable in 1986. The magazine began accepting advertising in 1991, under the editorship of Tom Slayton to defray postage and production costsand eventually closed in 2018.
