= Charles Garside =

American lawyer

Charles Garside, Sr.

President of the State University of New York Acting
- In office September 1, 1951 – January 1952
- Preceded by: Alvin C. Eurich
- Succeeded by: William S. Carlson

Personal details
- Born: May 12, 1898 Middletown, Connecticut
- Died: October 31, 1964 (aged 66)
- Education: Princeton University (A.B.); Cornell Law School (LL.D.)

Charles Garside, Sr. (May 12, 1898 – October 31, 1964) was a 20th-century lawyer who served in a number of publicly prominent roles in New York State, the most notable involving the State Commission against Discrimination, the formation of Blue Cross/Blue Shield of New York, and the State University of New York.

== Biography ==
Garside was born in Middletown, Connecticut and his studies at Cornell University were interrupted by America's entry into World War I. He served as a private in the United States Marine Corps. Garside earned a bachelor's degree in history and politics at Princeton University before attending Cornell Law School, from which he graduated in 1923. He was admitted to the New York State bar and practiced law at Choate, Larocque, and Mitchell, making partner in 1927. He was an active Young Republican, serving as vice president of The New York Young Republican Club.

In 1934, Fiorello H. La Guardia appointed him to a vacant Municipal Court justiceship, a position to which he was subsequently elected and served for ten years, though he resigned after two years to become a partner in his own law firm. He also became a director of the Harsco Corporation.

He served as a colonel in the Army's General Staff Corps in World War II and the Joint Army Navy Board for Training Unit Contracts.

After the war, he returned to private practice and ran for office against Charles A. Buckley in 1946. In 1947, Thomas E. Dewey tapped him to head the State Commission against Discrimination. He also headed the committee on medical education centers which eventually drove the creation of the Downstate and Upstate Medical Centers. He also helped mediate a violent strike at Bell Aircraft in Buffalo, New York in 1949.

Garside was a member of the State University board of trustees when he was tapped to assume the presidency of the SUNY System upon the resignation of his predecessor. At the time, Garside was serving as President of the Associated Hospital Service of New York, which later became New York Blue Cross/Blue Shield, a position he kept and served in until his retirement in 1959.

== See also ==
Academic offices
Preceded by Alvin C. Eurich	Acting President of the State University of New York; September 1, 1951 – January, 1952	Succeeded by William S. Carlson
