= Applied Psycholinguistics =

- Discipline: Psycholinguistics
- Language: English
- Edited by: Martha Crago

Publication details
- History: 1980–present
- Publisher: Cambridge University Press
- Frequency: Quarterly
- Impact factor: 0.950 (2011)

Standard abbreviations
- ISO 4: Appl. Psycholinguist.

Indexing
- ISSN: 0142-7164 (print); 1469-1817 (web)
- LCCN: 80647015
- OCLC no.: 297313536

Links
- Journal homepage; Online access; Online archive

Applied Psycholinguistics is a peer-reviewed academic journal in the field of psycholinguistics. It covers research on all aspects of this field, including language development and language disorders, especially studies made from a cross-language perspective. The journal was established in 1980 and is published quarterly by Cambridge University Press. The current editor-in-chief is Martha Crago (Dalhousie University).

== Abstracting and indexing ==
Applied Psycholinguistics is abstracted and indexed in:

- CSA Linguistics & Language Behavior Abstracts
- CSA Sociological Abstracts
- Social Sciences Citation Index
- Current Contents
- Multicultural Education Abstracts
- Modern Language Association
- Current Index to Journals in Education
- Child Development Abstracts
- Special Educational Needs Abstracts
