= Alvin C. Eurich =

Alvin Christian Eurich

1st President of the State University of New York
- In office January 1, 1949 – August 31, 1951
- Succeeded by: Charles Garside (Acting)

Acting President of Stanford University
- In office January 28, 1948 – December 31, 1948
- Preceded by: Donald Tresidder
- Succeeded by: Clarence Faust (acting); Wallace Sterling

Personal details
- Born: June 14, 1902 Bay City, Michigan, U.S.
- Died: May 27, 1987 (aged 84) New York, New York, U.S.

Alvin Christian Eurich (June 14, 1902 – May 27, 1987) was an American educator who served as the acting president of Stanford University in 1948 and as the first president of the State University of New York from 1949 to 1951.

== Early life and education ==
Eurich was born in Bay City, Michigan and pursued degrees in Psychology at North Central College and the University of Maine. He supported himself by working as a speech instructor while in Maine. He earned a Ph.D. in Educational Psychology at the University of Minnesota in 1929, where he worked as a professor and assistant dean of the College of Education from 1927 to 1936.

== Career ==
In 1937 he left for Northwestern University and a year after that, he left for Stanford University. During World War II, he served in the Navy, returning to take a Vice Presidency at Stanford University. He helped organize the Stanford Research Institute and served as its chairman. He was named acting President of Stanford in 1948 after his predecessor's sudden death, shortly before assuming the Presidency of SUNY.

From 1958 to 1964, Eurich served as Executive Director of the Ford Foundation's Educational Division and in 1961 he co-founded the Academy for Educational Development and served as its chairman for many years. He also served as President of the Aspen Institute for Humanistic Studies from 1963 to 1972.

In 1982, he was awarded the Outstanding Alumni Award by his undergraduate alma mater North Central College.

== Personal life ==
He was married to Nell Eurich; they had two children: Juliet Eurich McDonough and Donald Eurich. After his death, his wife married Maurice Lazarus.

Academic offices
Preceded by Donald Tresidder	President of Stanford University (Acting); January 28, 1948 – December 31, 1948	Succeeded by Clarence Faust (Acting)
New office	President of the State University of New York; January 1, 1949 – August 31, 1951	Succeeded by Charles Garside (Acting)
