= William S. Carlson =

American geologist & educator (1905–1994)

William Samuel Carlson (November 18, 1905 – May 8, 1994) was a 20th-century academic administrator who served as president of four universities.

Carlson was born in Ironwood, Michigan and earned bachelor's (1930), master's (1932) and Ph.D. (1938) degrees in geology from the University of Michigan. Carlson participated in the University of Michigan Greenland Expedition of 1928–1929 and led the fourth University of Michigan Greenland Expedition in 1930–1931. After completing his education, he joined the University of Minnesota as an assistant professor of education, eventually becoming a full professor and dean of admissions and records.

He served in the Air Force during the Second World War, building air bases in Canada, Greenland, and Iceland for transport to Britain.

After the war, he assumed the presidencies of the University of Delaware, the University of Vermont, and the State University of New York in rapid succession. He undertook his longest Presidency at the University of Toledo, from which he retired after 14 years.

Carlson succumbed to lung cancer in Belleair Bluffs, Florida. The main library on the University of Toledo campus is named after him.

== Selected works ==
- Carlson, William S. (1940), Greenland Lies North, New York, New York: Macmillan, OCLC 1344476
- Carlson, William S. (1941), Reports of the Greenland Expeditions of the University of Michigan, Ann Arbor, Michigan: University of Michigan Press, OCLC 23629934
- Carlson, William S. (1962), Lifelines through the Arctic, New York, New York: Duell, Sloan and Pearce, OCLC 620188
- Carlson, William S. (1962), The Municipal University, Washington, D.C.: Center for Applied Research in Education, OCLC 186142

Academic offices
Preceded by Wilbur O. Sypherd	President of the University of Delaware; 1946 – April 1950	Succeeded by Allan P. Colburn (Acting)
Preceded by John S. Millis	President of the University of Vermont; April 1950–1952	Succeeded by Carl W. Borgmann
Preceded by Charles Garside (Acting)	President of the State University of New York; January 1952 – September 1958	Succeeded by Thomas H. Hamilton
Preceded by Asa S. Knowles	President of the University of Toledo; September 1958–1972	Succeeded by Glen R. Driscoll
