= Alex B. Novikoff =

American biologist (1913– 1987)

- Born: 28 February 1913; Semyonovka, Russian Empire
- Died: 9 January 1987 (aged 73); New York City, New York, United States
- Education: Columbia University
- Known for: Cell organelles
- Scientific career
- Fields: Cell biology, histochemistry
- Workplaces: Brooklyn College; University of Vermont College of Medicine; Albert Einstein College of Medicine

Alex Benjamin Novikoff (28 February 1913 – 9 January 1987) was a Russian–born American biologist who is recognized for his pioneering works in the discoveries on cell organelles. A victim of American Cold War antagonism to communism that he supported, he is also recognized as a public figure of the mid-20th century at the height of McCarthyism in America. Writing in Nature, Alex Comfort concluded that he was "denied a well earned share in a Nobel Prize" for his work on cell organelles and autophagy.

Novikoff's most important achievements were in developing histochemical techniques that were used for discovering and studying structures and functions of cells. After he developed the cell fractionation method, it became possible to identify and isolate cell organelles. He was the first to describe lysosomes using electron microscopy; his collaborator Christian de Duve received the Nobel Prize for the discovery. He was also the first to understand the process of cell eating, which he called "cytolysomes," now known as autophagy, another Nobel Prize-winning discovery. He developed the method for making liver cancer cells, later called Novikoff hepatoma, which paved the way for cellular experiments in cancer studies.

After being accused of participation in the Communist Party as disloyalty to the nation, Novikoff was dismissed in 1953 from the University of Vermont College of Medicine where he was serving as a tenured professor, following his refusal to cooperate in disclosing his communist friends. He was even denied twice of his willingness to serve in the US Army during the Second World War. Due to lack of substantial evidence, the case itself was dismissed after twenty years. The incident has become popularly known as the "Novikoff Affair", and is the most notable case of McCarthyism in Vermont. In 1983, after thirty years of his banishment, the university made an apology by presenting him an honorary degree.

== Early life and education ==
Novikoff was born to Jewish parents in the small town of Semenivka in the Russian Empire. Hoping to overcome severe poverty under the then Soviet Union, his family emigrated to the United States. The family settled in the Brownsville section of Brooklyn, New York. His father earned their living by working as a salesman in a garment factory. Novikoff was a precocious boy, developing an early fascination for biology. His hobbies included skinning and dissecting animal corpses, and he once boiled a dead cat to observe its skeleton. He skipped four grades, and completed high school when he was only fourteen years of age. He graduated with B.S. degree from Columbia University in 1931 at the age of eighteen. Even under financial constraints, the family encouraged him to study medicine. However, antisemitism at the time prevented him from entering medical school. He therefore pursued the only open opportunity by continuing at the same university to study zoology. He joined the graduate school in 1931, and completed his M.A. in 1933.

== Career ==
While still at the graduate school, to support his studies, Novikoff worked as a part-time instructor at the new Brooklyn College. His initial research focused on experimental embryology, and soon his interest shifted to cell biology under the influence of Arthur Pollister. At age twenty-three, in 1936, he published his first technical paper titled "Transplantation of the polar lobe in Sabellaria vulgaris." In 1938 he was awarded his PhD. He was not on good terms with the other teachers and the administration at Brooklyn College, such that his promotion was delayed for a year even after his new degree. He did a post-doc at the University of Wisconsin in 1946–1947. In 1947 he joined the University of Vermont College of Medicine as Professor of Experimental Pathology and Biochemistry. He was expelled from the institute in 1953 on charges of disloyalty to the nation. In 1955 he joined the faculty of pathology at the newly established Albert Einstein College of Medicine, becoming full professor in 1958. He worked there for the rest of his life.

=== Achievements ===
During his career at Vermont, Novikoff had successfully developed a technique of cell fractionation. Using this he had separated cell fractions and identified six cell organelles, along with two unidentified fractions. Christian de Duve from Belgium became interested in the unknown fractions. In 1952 de Duve proposed that the fraction contained membrane-bound particle having specific enzymatic activity. Novikoff confirmed the enzyme activity in 1953. The two met at Central Park in New York City to discuss their results. In 1955, now confident that the membranous particles were cell organelles, de Duve gave a hypothetical name "lysosomes" to reflect their digestive properties. That same year, after visiting de Duve's laboratory, using his own histochemical protocol Novikoff successfully produced the first real images (electron micrographs) of the new organelle. In 1965 with de Duve, he confirmed the location of the hydrolytic enzymes of lysosomes. Novikoff further established the importance of lysosomes in diseases. "It is largely due to Novikoff's bold and imaginative use of morphological techniques," de Duve praised him, "that lysosomes have come to be recognized in a broader biological context." de Duve went on to win the Nobel Prize in Physiology or Medicine in 1974 for the discovery of lysosomes, but Novikoff's contributions were forgotten.

In 1956 Novikoff described a new class of membrane-bound organelles that he called "dense bodies." was the first to describe the actual lysosomal functions with respect to degradation of mitochondria. However he thought that the digestive activities he observed were due to other intracellular organelles which he called "cytolysomes". It was at the Ciba Foundation Symposium on Lysosomes held in London on 12–14 February 1963, that he explained this phenomenon in which organelles such as endoplasmic reticulum, ribosomes, mitochondria and other cell debris were degraded by autolysis in the cytolysomes. Then the following speaker de Duve correctly identified that these organelles were lysosomes, and named them autophagic vacuoles, and he introduced the term "autophagy" for the process of such intracellular digestion. In 1962 he established for the first time the functional relationship between ER, Golgi and lysosomes. He specifically showed that smooth-surfaced derivatives of the ER fused with the Golgi membranes and the Golgi membranes in turn fused with lysosomes. He was the first to show that this GERL is responsible vesicular transport during synthesis and sorting of proteins. He gave this functional organisation an acronym GERL, for Golgi-endoplasmic reticulum-lysosome. Novikoff's further works became a milestone in understanding the importance of autophagy in diseases such as cancer.

He was the first to establish the type of liver tumour, now known in his honour as "Novikoff hepatoma". In 1961 with Sidney Goldfischer, Novikoff developed a staining method for the Golgi body using the enzyme nucleosidediphosphatase, by which they described the enzymatic property of the organelle for the first time. In 1969 they developed a staining technique (alkaline diaminobenzidine, or DAB) by which they studied the structure of another new organelle, peroxisome, for the first time. In 1969 he gave the first clear-cut distinction between lysosomes and peroxisomes. In 1972, he and his wife discovered a new type of peroxisomes from the intestinal epithelium of rat, which they named "microperoxisome".

His works in cell biology are best summed up in a textbook he wrote with his student Eric Holtzman, Cells and Organelles, first published in 1970.

== Novikoff Affair ==
In 1935, Novikoff joined the Communist Party while he was working for a PhD. He was most inspired by the scientific attitude of Marxism towards the well-being of society, beside other idealistic issues. He helped to write and disseminate party newsletters in the Brooklyn campus, which was a centre of communist activity in the area. He became actively involved in the teachers' union and particularly fought against stratification of junior and senior faculty in the college. This caused serious antagonism with other teachers and the administration. In 1940 under a new college president, Novikoff was investigated for affiliation with the Communist Party. However, no further action was taken against him.

During the Second World War he voluntarily applied to serve in the US military on a medical commission. His applications were declined twice, in 1943 and in 1944. The objections were based on the allegations in the previous documents that his "loyalty" to the nation was doubtful. Ironically, he was employed by the US Army after the war, in 1948, to analyse two films about enzyme and carbohydrate metabolism. Even then doubt about his loyalty resurfaced and his appointment was terminated soon after he completed the major work.

In 1953 while he was a permanent faculty at the University of Vermont College of Medicine, at the time McCarthyism was at its height, anti-communist activists once again targeted him for his 1930s involvement in the Communist Party. But this time the case was taken to the federal level. On 23 April 1953, he refused to testify before the Senate Subcommittee on Internal Security at Washington, D.C., on anything about his past political life, especially on identification of his communist colleagues at Brooklyn College. His denial was taken as "positive evidence that he was the leader of communist-dominated union." Although he invoked the Fifth Amendment of the US Constitution, the Vermont administration made sure that the institute dismiss him. The then Vermont Governor Lee E. Emerson persuaded the university President Carl Borgmann to convene a six-person committee consisting of faculty and board of trustees, to assure that the "faculty is 100 percent pro-American and anti-communist". Even though the committee, chaired by Robert Joyce, voted 5 to 1 for Novikoff to remain in his profession, Emerson convinced the board of trustees to override the committee's decision.

The trustees therefore suspended Novikoff on 16 July initially for a month, with the "walk or talk" ultimatum that if Novikoff would not return to Washington to reveal names before the Senate Committee, he would be dismissed from the university. Members of the university's chapter of the American Association of University Professors could convince Borgmann in August 1953 that it was against the university bylaws to suspend Novikoff before any public hearing. Then a final hearing was convened that consisted of 23-member board of review, which included the governor, members of the board of trustees, and several faculty members. The board meeting on 29 August voted 14 to 8 to recommend the dismissal of Novikoff. A week later, on 5 September, the fifteen-member board of trustees confirmed his firing from the university, with a single dissenting vote from Robert Joyce. His case was kept open for twenty years, and having found no substantiated evidence, the FBI closed his file in 1974, which by then contained 822 pages. Vermont University then conferred him an honorary doctorate of science as a way of apology in 1983, after thirty years of his dismissal, with 8,000 audience giving standing ovation, and the university saluted his "integrity and courage."

== Awards and honours ==
- E.B.Wilson Award from the American Society for Cell Biology in 1982.
- Elected to the US National Academy of Sciences in 1974.
- A lifetime career grant of $25,000 annually for twenty-five years from the National Cancer Institute in 1962.
- Distinguished Service Award from Columbia University in 1960.
- Elected President of The Histochemical Society for the term 1958 to 1959.
- Elected President of the American Society for Cell Biology for the term 1962 to 1963.

== Death ==
Novikoff died on Friday, 28 January 1987, at the hospital of Albert Einstein College of Medicine. He was survived by his wife Dr. Phyllis, two sons, two sisters (Lillian and Sonia), and two grandchildren.
