= Tom Slayton =

American magazine editor

- Born: July 29, 1941 (age 85); Burlington, Vermont, U.S.
- Occupations: Journalist, author
- Known for: Vermont Life
- Spouse: Elizabeth Slayton
- Children: 1

Thomas Kennedy Slayton (born July 29, 1941) is a Vermont journalist, editor and author known for being the editor-in-chief of Vermont Life for twenty-one years.

== Early life and education ==
Slayton was born in Burlington, Vermont, the son of Dorothy Elizabeth Kennedy and artist and teacher Ron Slayton who painted for the WPA Easel Painters Project in the 1930s and 1940s. The family moved to New York, Tennessee and then back to Vermont. Slayton graduated from the University of Vermont in 1963, majoring in English and History. He served in the Army Reserve and then worked for the Rutland Herald from 1964 through 1985. During that time he was also a correspondent for the Boston Globe. While he was there he often reported on Vermont-centric topics such as a series of articles on families who have lived in the same house for generations, or an article about bog conservation which he wrote after camping on the bog (in winter) for a week. He was the chief of the Vermont Press Bureau.

== Vermont Life ==
Slayton was the editor-in-chief of Vermont Life from 1985 through 2007. He described his job as "keeper of the sacred myths of Vermont." He was an employee of the state of Vermont while working at this job, as were all of his staff. He oversaw the magazine's shift to an advertiser-supported model and also the launch of their online magazine, Vermont Life Digital. He retired in 2007 and retained the title of editor emeritus. Slayton also worked as a correspondent for Vermont Public Radio during and after his work at Vermont Life.

== Writing ==
Slayton wrote and edited many books about Vermont, art, and the outdoors. In 1999, while at Vermont Life, he published a book called The Beauty of Vermont with 100 photographs and text that came from his work at Vermont Public. In 2002 he published Sabra Field: The Art of Place about Vermont artist Sabra Field. He is the author of Finding Vermont: An Informal Guide to Vermont's Places and People as well as Searching for Thoreau: On the Trails and Shores of Wild New England, a collection of essays about Henry David Thoreau and the outdoors.

== Honors and awards ==
Slayton received an honorary Doctorate of Humane Letters from Sterling College in 2008. He has also received honorary doctorates from the University of Vermont and Southern Vermont College.

== Personal life ==
Slayton married Elizabeth Craig Wilson on December 24, 1964 and they had one son. Elizabeth Slayton died in 2022. Slayton lives in Randolph, Vermont.
