= Italian conjugation =

How verbs are conjugated in Italian

Italian verbs have a high degree of inflection, the majority of which follows one of three common patterns of conjugation. Italian conjugation is affected by mood, person, tense, number, aspect and occasionally gender.

The three classes of verbs (patterns of conjugation) are distinguished by the endings of the infinitive form of the verb:

- 1st conjugation: -are (amare "to love", parlare "to talk, to speak");
- 2nd conjugation: -ere (crédere "to believe", ricévere "to receive", vedére "to see");
  - -arre, -orre and -urre are considered part of the 2nd conjugation, as they are derived from Latin -ere but had lost their internal e after the suffix fused to the stem's vowel (a, o and u);
- 3rd conjugation: -ire (dormìre "to sleep");
  - 3rd conjugation -ire with infixed -isc- (finìre "to end, to finish").

Additionally, Italian has a number of verbs that do not follow predictable patterns in all conjugation classes, most markedly the present and the absolute past. Often classified together as irregular verbs, their irregularities occur to different degrees, with forms of èssere "to be", and somewhat less extremely, avére "to have", the least predictable. Others, such as andàre "to go", stare "to stay, to stand", dare "to give", fare "to do, to make", and numerous others, follow various degrees of regularity within paradigms, largely due to suppletion, historical sound change or analogical developments.

The suffixes that form the infinitive are always stressed, except for -ere, which is stressed in some verbs (e.g. vedere /veˈdeːre/ "to see") and unstressed in others (e.g. prendere /ˈprɛndere/ "to take"). A few verbs have a contracted infinitive, but use their uncontracted stem in most conjugations. Fare comes from Latin facere, which can be seen in many of its forms. Similarly, dire ("to say") comes from dīcere, bere ("to drink") comes from bibere and porre ("to put") comes from pōnere.

Together with the traditional patterns of conjugation, new classes and patterns have been suggested, in order to include common verbs such as avviare, which exhibit a quite different form and stress pattern.

== Present ==
The present is used for:

- events happening in the present
- habitual actions
- current states of being and conditions
- actions planned to occur in the future

	amare /aˈmaːre/	credere /ˈkreːdere/	vedere /veˈdeːre/	dormire /dorˈmiːre/	finire /fiˈniːre/	essere /ˈɛssere/	avere /aˈveːre/	andare /anˈdaːre/	stare /ˈstaːre/	dare /ˈdaːre/	fare /ˈfaːre/
io /ˈiːo/	amo /ˈaːmo/	credo /ˈkreːdo/	vedo /ˈveːdo/	dormo /ˈdɔrmo/	finisco /fiˈnisko/	sono /ˈsoːno/	ho /ɔ/	vado (Tuscan: vo) /ˈvaːdo/ /vɔ/	sto /stɔ/	do /dɔ/	faccio (Tuscan: fo) /ˈfattʃo/ /fɔ/
tu /tu/	ami /ˈaːmi/	credi /ˈkreːdi/	vedi /ˈveːdi/	dormi /ˈdɔrmi/	finisci /fiˈniʃʃi/	sei /ˈsɛi/	hai /ˈai/	vai /ˈvai/	stai /ˈstai/	dai /ˈdai/	fai /ˈfai/
lui / lei / Lei /ˈlui/ /ˈlɛi/	ama /ˈaːma/	crede /ˈkreːde/	vede /ˈveːde/	dorme /ˈdɔrme/	finisce /fiˈniʃʃe/	è /ɛ/	ha /a/	va /va/	sta /sta/	dà /da/	fa /fa/
noi /ˈnoi/	amiamo /aˈmjaːmo/	crediamo /kreˈdjaːmo/	vediamo /veˈdjaːmo/	dormiamo /dorˈmjaːmo/	finiamo /fiˈnjaːmo/	siamo /ˈsjaːmo/	abbiamo /abˈbjaːmo/	andiamo /anˈdjaːmo/	stiamo /ˈstjaːmo/	diamo /ˈdjaːmo/	facciamo /fatˈtʃaːmo/
voi /ˈvoi/	amate /aˈmaːte/	credete /kreˈdeːte/	vedete /veˈdeːte/	dormite /dorˈmiːte/	finite /fiˈniːte/	siete /ˈsjeːte, ˈsjɛːte/	avete /aˈveːte/	andate /anˈdaːte/	state /ˈstaːte/	date /ˈdaːte/	fate /ˈfaːte/
loro / Loro /ˈloːro/	amano /ˈaːmano/	credono /ˈkreːdono/	vedono /ˈveːdono/	dormono /ˈdɔrmono/	finiscono /fiˈniskono/	sono /ˈsoːno/	hanno /ˈanno/	vanno /ˈvanno/	stanno /ˈstanno/	danno /ˈdanno/	fanno /ˈfanno/

- io credo "I believe"
- lei dorme "she sleeps"

Subject pronouns are not obligatory in Italian, and they are normally only used when they are stressed. The conjugation of the verb is normally used to show the subject.

- credo "I believe"
- credi "you believe" (2nd pers. sing.)
- crede "he/she believes"

The pronoun tu (and corresponding verb forms) is used in the singular towards children, family members and close friends (cf. "thou"), whereas voi is used in the same manner in the plural (cf. "ye"). The pronouns Lei and Loro (though much more commonly just voi) are used towards older people, strangers and very important or respectable people. Note that lei and loro can also mean "she" and "they", respectively.

- Lei va "you are going" (formal)
- tu vai "you are going" (informal)
- vai "you are going" (informal)
- va "you are going" (formal)

The irregular verb essere has the same form in the first person singular and third person plural.

- sono "I am"/"they are"

The forms vado and faccio are the standard Italian first person singular forms of the verbs andare and fare, but vo and fo are used in the Tuscan dialect.

The infix -isc- varies in pronunciation between /isk/ and /iʃʃ/, depending on the following vowel. Similar alternations are found in other verbs:

- leggo /ˈlɛɡɡo/ "I read" vs. leggi /ˈlɛddʒi/ "you read"
- dico /ˈdiːko/ "I say" vs. dici /ˈdiːtʃi/ "you say"
- etc.

== Past ==
=== Present perfect (Il passato prossimo) ===
The present perfect is used for single actions or events (stamattina sono andato a scuola "I went to school this morning"), or change in state (si è arrabbiato quando gliel’ho detto "he got angry when I told him that"), contrasting with the imperfect which is used for habits (andavo in bicicletta a scuola ogni mattina "I used to go to school by bike every morning"), or repeated actions, not happening at a specific time (si arrabbiava ogni volta che qualcuno glielo diceva "he got angry every time someone told him that").

==== Past participles ====
The past participle is used to form the compound pasts (e.g. ho lavorato, avevo lavorato, ebbi lavorato, avrò lavorato). Regular verbs follow a predictable pattern, but there are many verbs with an irregular past participle.

- verbs in -are add -ato to the stem: parlato, amato;
- some verbs in -ere add -uto to the stem: creduto;
- verbs in -ire add -ito to the stem: partito, finito;
- other verbs in -ere are irregular, they mutate the stem and add -o, -so, -sto or -tto to the stem: preso /ˈpreːzo, ˈpreːso/ (from prendere), letto /ˈlɛtto/ (from leggere), rimasto (from rimanere);
- fare and dire do exactly the same thing: fatto (from fare), detto /ˈdetto/ (from dire). Compounds from the root -durre similarly have -dotto /ˈdotto/;
- venire has venuto and bere has bevuto;
- stare and essere both have stato.

==== Verbs with avere ====
All transitive verbs and most intransitive verbs form the present perfect by combining the auxiliary verb avere "to have" in the present tense with the past participle of the transitive verb.

	amare
io	ho amato
tu	hai amato
lui / lei / Lei	ha amato
noi	abbiamo amato
voi	avete amato
loro / Loro	hanno amato

Except with an immediately preceding third person pronominal direct object, the participle always ends in -o.

- il ragazzo che ho visto "the boy I saw"
- l’ho visto "I saw him"
- ho visto il ragazzo "I saw the boy"
- la ragazza che ho visto "the girl I saw"
- l’ho vista "I saw her"
- ho visto la ragazza "I saw the girl"

==== Verbs with essere ====
A small number of intransitive verbs, namely essere itself and verbs indicating motion (venire "to come", andare "to go", arrivare "to arrive", etc.) use the auxiliary verb essere instead of avere. The past participle in this agrees with gender and number of the subject.

	arrivare
io	sono arrivato/-a
tu	sei arrivato/-a
lui / lei / Lei	è arrivato/-a
noi	siamo arrivati/-e
voi	siete arrivati/-e
loro / Loro	sono arrivati/-e

When using essere, the past participle agrees in gender and number with preceding third person direct object clitic pronouns, following the same pattern of nouns and adjectives:

- -o masculine singular
- -a feminine singular
- -i masculine plural
- -e feminine plural

Reflexive verbs always use essere, and their past participle agrees with the subject or with third person object pronouns, if these precede the verb.

- mi sono lavato/-a "I washed myself"
- ci siamo visti/-e "we saw each other"
- si è lavato le gambe "he washed his legs"
- se le è lavate, le gambe "he washed them, his legs"
- ci siamo parlati "we talked to each other"

=== Imperfect (L'imperfetto) ===
The Imperfect fuses past tense with imperfective aspect and is used for:

- repeated or habitual actions in the past;
- ongoing actions in the past and ongoing actions in the past that are eventually interrupted;
- states of being and conditions in the past, including weather, time, age.

The difference between imperfective and perfective aspects can be illustrated clearly with the verb sapere 'to know'. The Italian imperfect expresses being in possession of knowledge in the past, while the perfective expresses the moment of acquiring the knowledge.

Imperfective: Sapevo la verità. 'I knew the truth.' Perfective: Ho saputo la verità. 'I found out the truth.'

The imperfect is, in most cases, formed by taking the stem along with the thematic vowel and adding v + the ending of the '-are' verbs in the present tense (with -amo instead of -iamo). There are no irregular conjugations in the Imperfect except for essere, which uses the stem er- and v appears only in 1st and 2nd person plurals. Verbs with contracted infinitive forms use their full stems, e.g. dicevo (infinitive dire), facevo (infinitive fare), bevevo (infinitive bere), ponevo (infinitive porre).

	amare	credere	dormire	finire	essere	avere	andare	stare	dare	fare
io	amavo /aˈmaːvo/	credevo /kreˈdeːvo/	dormivo /dorˈmiːvo/	finivo /fiˈniːvo/	ero /ˈɛːro/	avevo /aˈveːvo/	andavo /anˈdaːvo/	stavo /ˈstaːvo/	davo /ˈdaːvo/	facevo /faˈtʃeːvo/
tu	amavi /aˈmaːvi/	credevi /kreˈdeːvi/	dormivi /dorˈmiːvi/	finivi /fiˈniːvi/	eri /ˈɛːri/	avevi /aˈveːvi/	andavi /anˈdaːvi/	stavi /ˈstaːvi/	davi /ˈdaːvi/	facevi /faˈtʃeːvi/
lui / lei / Lei	amava /aˈmaːva/	credeva /kreˈdeːva/	dormiva /dorˈmiːva/	finiva /fiˈniːva/	era /ˈɛːra/	aveva /aˈveːva/	andava /anˈdaːva/	stava /ˈstaːva/	dava /ˈdaːva/	faceva /faˈtʃeːva/
noi	amavamo /amaˈvaːmo/	credevamo /kredeˈvaːmo/	dormivamo /dormiˈvaːmo/	finivamo /finiˈvaːmo/	eravamo /eraˈvaːmo/	avevamo /aveˈvaːmo/	andavamo /andaˈvaːmo/	stavamo /staˈvaːmo/	davamo /daˈvaːmo/	facevamo /fatʃeˈvaːmo/
voi	amavate /amaˈvaːte/	credevate /kredeˈvaːte/	dormivate /dormiˈvaːte/	finivate /finiˈvaːte/	eravate /eraˈvaːte/	avevate /aveˈvaːte/	andavate /andaˈvaːte/	stavate /staˈvaːte/	davate /daˈvaːte/	facevate /fatʃeˈvaːte/
loro / Loro	amavano /aˈmaːvano/	credevano /kreˈdeːvano/	dormivano /dorˈmiːvano/	finivano /fiˈniːvano/	erano /ˈɛːrano/	avevano /aˈveːvano/	andavano /anˈdaːvano/	stavano /ˈstaːvano/	davano /ˈdaːvano/	facevano /faˈtʃeːvano/

- loro parlavano "they used to speak"

=== Absolute past (Il passato remoto) ===
The absolute past has a function distinct from the present perfect. It is used for events which are distant from the present and no longer directly affect it (e.g., telling a story), whereas the present perfect is used for more recent events which may have a direct impact on the present. The absolute past may at all times be replaced with the present perfect (but not vice versa). In many areas of Southern Italy, it is still used commonly in spoken language, whereas in Northern-Central Italy and Sardinia it is restricted to written language.

Like the past participle, regular verbs are very predictable, but many verbs (mainly of the second conjugation) are irregular.

- Regular verbs are formed by taking the stem and the stressed thematic vowel and adding -i, -sti, main stress, -mmo, -ste, and -rono. Verbs in -are have -ò in the third person singular instead of the expected -à:
  - amare: amai, amasti, amò, amammo, amaste, amarono
  - credere: credei, credesti, credé, credemmo, credeste, crederono
  - dormire: dormii, dormisti, dormì, dormimmo, dormiste, dormirono
- Irregular verbs, which are almost exclusively of the second conjugation, have irregular stems to which the endings -i, -e, and -ero are added to form the first-person singular and third-person singular and plural forms, respectively, and, with the exception of venire, which takes the normal third conjugation endings, the second conjugation endings -esti, -emmo, and -este are added to the normal stem to form the second-person singular and first- and second-person plural forms, respectively (dire, bere, fare, and porre use their long stems here, as usual):
  - rompere: ruppi, rompesti, ruppe, rompemmo, rompeste, ruppero
  - vedere: vidi, vedesti, vide, vedemmo, vedeste, videro
  - dire: dissi, dicesti, disse, dicemmo, diceste, dissero
- Some verbs in -ere that follow the regular pattern (-ei, -esti, etc.) have an alternative form in -etti which follows the irregular pattern:
  - credere: credetti (= credei), credesti, credette (= credé), credemmo, credeste, credettero (= crederono)
- Essere is the only verb that is completely irregular in this tense.

	amare	credere	dormire	finire	essere	avere	andare	stare	dare	fare
io	amai /aˈmai/	credei or credetti /kreˈdei/ /kreˈdɛtti/	dormii /dorˈmiːi/	finii /fiˈniːi/	fui /ˈfui/	ebbi /ˈɛbbi/	andai /anˈdai/	stetti /ˈstɛtti/	diedi or detti /ˈdjɛːdi/ /ˈdɛtti/	feci /ˈfeːtʃi/
tu	amasti /aˈmasti/	credesti /kreˈdesti/	dormisti /dorˈmisti/	finisti /fiˈnisti/	fosti /ˈfosti/	avesti /aˈvesti/	andasti /anˈdasti/	stesti /ˈstesti/	desti /ˈdesti/	facesti /faˈtʃesti/
lui / lei / Lei	amò /aˈmɔ/	credé or credette /kreˈde/ /kreˈdɛtte/	dormì /dorˈmi/	finì /fiˈni/	fu /fu/	ebbe /ˈɛbbe/	andò /anˈdɔ/	stette /ˈstɛtte/	diede or dette /ˈdjɛːde/ /ˈdɛtte/	fece /ˈfeːtʃe/
noi	amammo /aˈmammo/	credemmo /kreˈdemmo/	dormimmo /dorˈmimmo/	finimmo /fiˈnimmo/	fummo /ˈfummo/	avemmo /aˈvemmo/	andammo /anˈdammo/	stemmo /ˈstemmo/	demmo /ˈdemmo/	facemmo /faˈtʃemmo/
voi	amaste /aˈmaste/	credeste /kreˈdeste/	dormiste /dorˈmiste/	finiste /fiˈniste/	foste /ˈfoste/	aveste /aˈveste/	andaste /anˈdaste/	steste /ˈsteste/	deste /ˈdeste/	faceste /faˈtʃeste/
loro / Loro	amarono /aˈmaːrono/	crederono or credettero /kreˈdeːrono/ /kreˈdɛttero/	dormirono /dorˈmiːrono/	finirono /fiˈniːrono/	furono /ˈfuːrono/	ebbero /ˈɛbbero/	andarono /anˈdaːrono/	stettero /ˈstɛttero/	diedero or dettero /ˈdjɛːdero/ /ˈdɛttero/	fecero /ˈfeːtʃero/

=== Past perfect (Il trapassato prossimo) ===
Used for activities done prior to another activity (translates to constructions such as "had eaten", "had seen").

The past perfect is formed the same as the present perfect, but with the auxiliary verb in the imperfect.

- amare: avevo amato
- arrivare: ero arrivato/-a

In literary language, an absolute perfect exists which uses the absolute past of the auxiliaries, and which is used for activities done prior to another activity which is described with the absolutive past. This form is known as trapassato remoto.

- amare: ebbi amato
- arrivare: fui arrivato/-a

== Future ==
=== Simple future (Il futuro semplice) ===
The simple future tense is used for events that will happen in the future. It is formed by adding the forms of avere to the infinitive (with abbiamo and avete contracted to -emo and -ete respectively). Sometimes the infinitive undergoes some changes:

- it always loses its final e;
- verbs in -are end in -er, not in -ar;
- stare, dare, fare however retain star-, dar-, far-;
- most irregular verbs lose the vowel before the last r altogether (e.g. avr- for avere and andr- for andare). Clusters -nr- and -lr- are simplified to -rr (e.g. verr- for venire);
- contracted infinitives are retained (e.g. porr- for porre);
- essere has sar-.

To these, the respective suffixes -ò, -ai, -à, -emo, -ete, -anno are added. Historically speaking, these are derived from the present forms of the verb avere.

	amare	credere	dormire	finire	essere	avere	andare	stare	dare	fare
io	amerò /ameˈrɔ/	crederò /kredeˈrɔ/	dormirò /dormiˈrɔ/	finirò /finiˈrɔ/	sarò /saˈrɔ/	avrò /aˈvrɔ/	andrò /anˈdrɔ/	starò /staˈrɔ/	darò /daˈrɔ/	farò /faˈrɔ/
tu	amerai /ameˈrai/	crederai /kredeˈrai/	dormirai /dormiˈrai/	finirai /finiˈrai/	sarai /saˈrai/	avrai /aˈvrai/	andrai /anˈdrai/	starai /staˈrai/	darai /daˈrai/	farai /faˈrai/
lui / lei / Lei	amerà /ameˈra/	crederà /kredeˈra/	dormirà /dormiˈra/	finirà /finiˈra/	sarà /saˈra/	avrà /aˈvra/	andrà /anˈdra/	starà /staˈra/	darà /daˈra/	farà /faˈra/
noi	ameremo /ameˈreːmo/	crederemo /kredeˈreːmo/	dormiremo /dormiˈreːmo/	finiremo /finiˈreːmo/	saremo /saˈreːmo/	avremo /aˈvreːmo/	andremo /anˈdreːmo/	staremo /staˈreːmo/	daremo /daˈreːmo/	faremo /faˈreːmo/
voi	amerete /ameˈreːte/	crederete /kredeˈreːte/	dormirete /dormiˈreːte/	finirete /finiˈreːte/	sarete /saˈreːte/	avrete /aˈvreːte/	andrete /an'dreːte/	starete /staˈreːte/	darete /daˈreːte/	farete /faˈreːte/
loro / Loro	ameranno /ameˈranno/	crederanno /kredeˈranno/	dormiranno /dormiˈranno/	finiranno /finiˈranno/	saranno /saˈranno/	avranno /aˈvranno/	andranno /anˈdranno/	staranno /staˈranno/	daranno /daˈranno/	faranno /faˈranno/

=== Future perfect (Il futuro anteriore) ===
Used for events that will have happened when or before something else happens in the future.

The future perfect is formed the same as the present perfect, but with the auxiliary verb in the future.

- amare: avrò amato
- arrivare: sarò arrivato/-a

== Conditional ==
=== Present conditional (Il condizionale presente) ===
Used for:

- events that are dependent upon another event occurring;
- politely asking for something (like in English, "Could I please have a glass of water?").

The conditional is formed by taking the root of the future (i.e., an adapted form of the infinitive) and adding the absolutive past forms of avere (with ebbi, avesti, avemmo, aveste contracted to -ei, -esti, -emmo, -este resp.).

	amare	credere	dormire
io	amerei /ameˈrɛi/	crederei /kredeˈrɛi/	dormirei /dormiˈrɛi/
tu	ameresti /ameˈresti/	crederesti /kredeˈresti/	dormiresti /dormiˈresti/
lui / lei / Lei	amerebbe /ameˈrɛbbe/	crederebbe /kredeˈrɛbbe/	dormirebbe /dormiˈrɛbbe/
noi	ameremmo /ameˈremmo/	crederemmo /kredeˈremmo/	dormiremmo /dormiˈremmo/
voi	amereste /ameˈreste/	credereste /kredeˈreste/	dormireste /dormiˈreste/
loro / Loro	amerebbero /ameˈrɛbbero/	crederebbero /kredeˈrɛbbero/	dormirebbero /dormiˈrɛbbero/

=== Past conditional (Il condizionale passato) ===
Used:

- for events that would, could or should have occurred;
- as a prospective past tense, e.g. Non sapevo quando sarei arrivato. “I didn’t know when I would arrive.”

The conditional perfect is formed the same as the present perfect, but with the auxiliary verb in the conditional.

- amare: avrei amato
- arrivare: sarei arrivato/-a

== Subjunctive ==
=== Present subjunctive (Il congiuntivo presente) ===
Used for subordinate clauses of the present (il presente) to express possibility, opinion, desire, or doubt.

The subjunctive is formed:

- for regular verbs in -are, by taking the root and adding -i, -ino for all the singular forms and the third plural respectively;
- for most other regular and semi-regular verbs, by taking the first person singular of the Present Indicative and replacing the final -o with -a, -ano for all the singular forms and the third plural respectively;
- for a few irregular verbs, by taking the first person plural of the Present Indicative and replacing stressed -amo with unstressed -a, -ano for all the singular forms and the third plural respectively;
- for all verbs, the first person plural is identical to the Present Indicative.
- for all verbs, the second person plural is the first person plural with -te instead of -mo.

The subjunctive is almost always preceded by the conjunctive word che (or compounds such as perché, affinché, etc.).

	amare	credere	dormire	finire	essere	avere	andare	stare	dare	fare
io	che ami /ˈaːmi/	che creda /ˈkreːda/	che dorma /ˈdɔrma/	che finisca /fiˈniska/	che sia /ˈsiːa/	che abbia /ˈabbja/	che vada /ˈvaːda/	che stia /ˈstiːa/	che dia /ˈdiːa/	che faccia /ˈfattʃa/
tu	che ami /ˈaːmi/	che creda /ˈkreːda/	che dorma /ˈdɔrma/	che finisca /fiˈniska/	che sia /ˈsiːa/	che abbia /ˈabbja/	che vada /ˈvaːda/	che stia /ˈstiːa/	che dia /ˈdiːa/	che faccia /ˈfattʃa/
lui / lei / Lei	che ami /ˈaːmi/	che creda /ˈkreːda/	che dorma /ˈdɔrma/	che finisca /fiˈniska/	che sia /ˈsiːa/	che abbia /ˈabbja/	che vada /ˈvaːda/	che stia /ˈstiːa/	che dia /ˈdiːa/	che faccia /ˈfattʃa/
noi	che amiamo /aˈmjaːmo/	che crediamo /kreˈdjaːmo/	che dormiamo /dorˈmjaːmo/	che finiamo /fiˈnjaːmo/	che siamo /ˈsjaːmo/	che abbiamo /abˈbjaːmo/	che andiamo /anˈdjaːmo/	che stiamo /ˈstjaːmo/	che diamo /ˈdjaːmo/	che facciamo /fatˈtʃaːmo/
voi	che amiate /aˈmjaːte/	che crediate /kreˈdjaːte/	che dormiate /dorˈmjaːte/	che finiate /fiˈnjaːte/	che siate /ˈsjaːte/	che abbiate /abˈbjaːte/	che andiate /anˈdjaːte/	che stiate /ˈstjaːte/	che diate /ˈdjaːte/	che facciate /fatˈtʃaːte/
loro / Loro	che amino /ˈaːmino/	che credano /ˈkreːdano/	che dormano /ˈdɔrmano/	che finiscano /fiˈniskano/	che siano /ˈsiːano/	che abbiano /ˈabbjano/	che vadano /ˈvaːdano/	che stiano /ˈstiːano/	che diano /ˈdiːano/	che facciano /ˈfattʃano/

=== Imperfect subjunctive (Il congiuntivo imperfetto) ===
Used for the subordinate clauses of the imperfect indicative or the conditional.

The imperfect subjunctive is formed:

- for regular verbs, by taking the Infinitive and replacing -re with -ssi, -ssi, -sse, -ssimo, -ste, -ssero;
- for contracted verbs, by taking, instead of the Infinitive, the stem plus the thematic vowel;
- the only verbs that form this tense irregularly are essere, fare, stare, dare (these two follow the pattern of verbs in -ere rather than the one of verbs in -are).

	amare	credere	dormire	finire	essere	avere	andare	stare	dare	fare
io	che amassi /aˈmassi/	che credessi /kreˈdessi/	che dormissi /dorˈmissi/	che finissi /fiˈnissi/	che fossi /ˈfossi/	che avessi /aˈvessi/	che andassi /anˈdassi/	che stessi /ˈstessi/	che dessi /ˈdessi/	che facessi /faˈtʃessi/
tu	che amassi /aˈmassi/	che credessi /kreˈdessi/	che dormissi /dorˈmissi/	che finissi /fiˈnissi/	che fossi /ˈfossi/	che avessi /aˈvessi/	che andassi /anˈdassi/	che stessi /ˈstessi/	che dessi /ˈdessi/	che facessi /faˈtʃessi/
lui / lei / Lei	che amasse /aˈmasse/	che credesse /kreˈdesse/	che dormisse /dorˈmisse/	che finisse /fiˈnisse/	che fosse /ˈfosse/	che avesse /aˈvesse/	che andasse /anˈdasse/	che stesse /ˈstesse/	che desse /ˈdesse/	che facesse /faˈtʃesse/
noi	che amassimo /aˈmassimo/	che credessimo /kreˈdessimo/	che dormissimo /dorˈmissimo/	che finissimo /fiˈnissimo/	che fossimo /ˈfossimo/	che avessimo /aˈvessimo/	che andassimo /anˈdassimo/	che stessimo /ˈstessimo/	che dessimo /ˈdessimo/	che facessimo /faˈtʃessimo/
voi	che amaste /aˈmaste/	che credeste /kreˈdeste/	che dormiste /dorˈmiste/	che finiste /fiˈniste/	che foste /ˈfoste/	che aveste /aˈveste/	che andaste /anˈdaste/	che steste /ˈsteste/	che deste /ˈdeste/	che faceste /faˈtʃeste/
loro / Loro	che amassero /aˈmassero/	che credessero /kreˈdessero/	che dormissero /dorˈmissero/	che finissero /fiˈnissero/	che fossero /ˈfossero/	che avessero /aˈvessero/	che andassero /anˈdassero/	che stessero /ˈstessero/	che dessero /ˈdessero/	che facessero /faˈtʃessero/

=== Past subjunctive (Il congiuntivo passato) ===
Used for subordinate clauses of the imperfect indicative or the conditional.

The subjunctive perfect is formed the same as the present perfect, but with the auxiliary verb in the subjunctive present.

- amare: che abbia amato
- arrivare: che sia arrivato/-a

=== Pluperfect subjunctive (Il congiuntivo trapassato) ===
The subjunctive pluperfect is formed the same as the present perfect, but with the auxiliary verb in the subjunctive imperfect.

- amare: che avessi amato
- arrivare: che fossi arrivato/-a

== Imperative ==
The imperative (l'imperativo) is used for giving commands.

The second-person singular imperative is formed:

- for regular verbs in -are, by taking the third person singular of the present (e.g. parla)
- for other regular verbs, by taking the second person singular of the Present (e.g. prendi, parti, finisci)
- for andare, dare, fare, and stare*, by taking the second person singular of the Present, either shortened to the vowel before i or not (e.g. va’/vai for andare)
- for dire*, by shortening the stem to di’
- for a few irregular verbs, by taking the singular form of the Subjunctive and replacing final -a with -i (e.g. vogli for volere)

*For the verbs andare, dare, fare, stare the conjugation actually follows the natural ending of the conjugation, but the apostrophe is needed to distinguish them from the third personal singular of the indicative present. The same is true for dire, where the apostrophe is used for distinguish it from the preposition "di" (of).

The polite form of the singular is identical to the present subjunctive. Objective personal pronouns are placed before the verb, unlike other forms of the imperative which have these after the verb (e.g. Mi aiuti, per favore! "Please help me!" vs. Aiutami! "Help me!", Se ne vada via. "Please go away." vs. Vattene via! (vattene = va’ + te + ne), etc.).

The first-person plural (used for suggestion, e.g. andiamo "let's go!") is identical to the present indicative, but allows for pronominal suffixes (e.g. andiamocene "let's go away" vs. ce ne andiamo "we are going away").

The second-person plural is usually identical to the present indicative, but in a few irregular cases to the present subjunctive.

The polite plural is identical to the present subjunctive. As with the polite singular, objective personal pronouns come before the verb as opposed to after it.

	amare	credere	dormire	finire	essere	avere	andare	stare	dare	fare	dire
(tu)	ama! /ˈaːma/	credi! /ˈkreːdi/	dormi! /ˈdɔrmi/	finisci! /fiˈniʃʃi/	sii! /ˈsiːi/	abbi! /ˈabbi/	va’! or vai! /va/ /ˈvai/	sta’! (or stai!) /sta/ /ˈstai/	da’! (or dai!) /da/ /ˈdai/	fa’! (or fai!) /fa/ /ˈfai/	di’! /di/
(Lei)	ami! /ˈaːmi/	creda! /ˈkreːda/	dorma! /ˈdɔrma/	finisca! /fiˈniska/	sia! /ˈsiːa/	abbia! /ˈabbja/	vada! /ˈvaːda/	stia! /ˈstiːa/	dia! /ˈdiːa/	faccia! /ˈfattʃa/	dica! /ˈdiːka/
(noi)	amiamo! /aˈmjaːmo/	crediamo! /kreˈdjaːmo/	dormiamo! /dorˈmjaːmo/	finiamo! /fiˈnjaːmo/	siamo! /ˈsjaːmo/	abbiamo! /abˈbjaːmo/	andiamo! /anˈdjaːmo/	stiamo! /ˈstjaːmo/	diamo! /ˈdjaːmo/	facciamo! /fatˈtʃaːmo/	diciamo! /diˈtʃaːmo/
(voi)	amate! /aˈmaːte/	credete! /kreˈdeːte/	dormite! /dorˈmiːte/	finite! /fiˈniːte/	siate! /ˈsjaːte/	abbiate! /abˈbjaːte/	andate! /anˈdaːte/	state! /ˈstaːte/	date! /ˈdaːte/	fate! /ˈfaːte/	dite! /ˈdiːte/
(Loro)	amino! /ˈaːmino/	credano! /ˈkreːdano/	dormano! /ˈdɔrmano/	finiscano! /fiˈniskano/	siano! /ˈsiːano/	abbiano! /ˈabbjano/	vadano! /ˈvaːdano/	stiano! /ˈstiːano/	diano! /ˈdiːano/	facciano! /ˈfattʃano/	dicano! /ˈdiːkano/

- credi! "believe!"
- crediamo! "let's believe!"

=== Negative imperative ===
The second-person singular uses the infinitive instead of its usual form in the negative, while other forms remain unchanged.

	amare	credere	dormire
(tu)	non amare	non credere	non dormire
(Lei)	non ami	non creda	non dorma
(noi)	non amiamo	non crediamo	non dormiamo
(voi)	non amate	non credete	non dormite
(Loro)	non amino	non credano	non dormano

- non credere! "don't believe!"

== Nominal verb forms ==
Italian verbs have three additional forms, known as nominal forms, because they can be used as nouns or adjectives, rather than as verbs.

- the past participle (participio passato) has been discussed above
- the present participle (participio presente) is used as an adjective or a noun describing someone who is busy doing something. For example, parlante means "talking" or "someone who is talking":
  - verbs in -are form the present participle by adding -ante to the stem
  - verbs in -ere and -ire form the present participle by adding -ente /ˈɛnte/ to the stem
  - fare, dire, bere, porre use their long stems to form resp. facente, dicente, bevente, ponente
  - essere has essente (though very rare)
- the gerund (gerundio) is the adverbial form of the present participle, and has a very broad use. For example: parlando can translate to "talking / while talking / by talking / because of one's talking / through talking / …":
  - the gerund is identical to the present participle, but with final -te replaced by -do

The gerund can be used in combination with the verb stare to create continuous expressions. These are similar to English continuous expressions (e.g. I am talking) but they are used much less extensively than in English.
- sto lavorando "I'm working"
- stavo mangiando "I was eating"
Keep in mind that the gerund is an adverb, not an adjective, and so it does not agree in gender and number with anything. The ending is always -o:
- la ragazza sta mangiando "The girl is eating"

Like the imperative, all nominal verb forms (including the infinitive) have their objective personal pronouns suffixed rather than placed before them.

- mi parla > parlarmi; (parlatomi); (parlantemi); parlandomi; parlami!
- si pone > porsi; (postosi); (ponentesi); ponendosi; poniti!
- me lo dice > dirmelo; (dettomelo); (dicentemelo); dicendomelo; dimmelo!
- se ne va via > andarsene via; (andatosene via); (andantesene via); andandosene via; vattene via!

== Irregular verbs ==
The following list includes some example conjugations for a number of verbs commonly classified as irregular, not sorted by type or degree of irregularity. Verbs derived from others (e.g. apprèndere, comprèndere, sorprèndere, ... from prèndere) and the ones which end in the same way (e.g. stèndere, rèndere, accèndere, ...; compare véndere, which is regular) are formed according to the same conjugation.
The list does not include essere, avere, andare, stare, dare and fare, that have already been conjugated throughout the article.

Abbreviations

• pr. = present;
• p.p. = past perfect;
• p.abs. = past absolute;
• impf. = imperfect;
• fut. = future;
• pr.sub. = present subjunctive;
• impf.sub. = imperfect subjunctive;
• imp. = imperative;
• pr.pt. = present participle

- affiggere /afˈfiddʒere/ "to post (up), to stick up": pr. affiggo, affiggi, affigge, affiggiamo, affiggete, affiggono; p.p. ho affisso; impf. affiggevo; p.abs. affissi, affiggesti; fut. affiggerò; pr.sub. che affigga, che affiggiamo; impf.sub. che affiggessi; imp. affiggi!, affigga!, affiggiamo!, affiggete!; pr.pt. affiggente;
- apparire /appaˈriːre/ "to appear": pr. appaio /apˈpaːjo/, appari, appare, appariamo, apparite, appaiono; p.p. sono apparso/-a; impf. apparivo; p.abs. apparvi, apparisti; fut. apparirò; pr.sub. che appaia, che appariamo; impf.sub. che apparissi; imp. appari!, appaia!, appariamo!, apparite!; pr.pt. apparente;
- aprire /aˈpriːre/ "to open": pr. apro, apri, apre, apriamo, aprite, aprono; p.p. ho aperto /aˈpɛrto/; impf. aprivo; p.abs. aprii/apersi /aˈpɛrsi/, apristi; fut. aprirò; pr.sub. che apra, che apriamo; impf.sub. che aprissi; imp. apri!, apra!, apriamo!, aprite!; pr.pt. aprente;
- assumere /asˈsuːmere/ "to assume": pr. assumo, assumi, assume, assumiamo, assumete, assumono; p.p. ho assunto; impf. assumevo; p.abs. assunsi, assumesti; fut. assumerò; pr.sub. che assuma, che assumiamo; impf.sub. che assumessi; imp. assumi!, assuma!, assumiamo!, assumete!; pr.pt. assumente;
- bere /ˈbeːre/ "to drink": pr. bevo /ˈbeːvo/, bevi, beve, beviamo, bevete, bevono; p.p. ho bevuto; impf. bevevo; p.abs. bevvi /ˈbevvi/, bevesti; fut. berrò; pr.sub. che beva, che beviamo; impf.sub. che bevessi; imp. bevi!, beva!, beviamo!, bevete!; pr.pt. bevente;
- cadere /kaˈdeːre/ "to fall (down)": pr. cado, cadi, cade, cadiamo, cadete, cadono; p.p. sono caduto/-a; impf. cadevo; p.abs. caddi, cadesti; fut. cadrò; pr.sub. che cada, che cadiamo; impf.sub. che cadessi; imp. cadi!, cada!, cadiamo!, cadete!; pr.pt. cadente;
- chiedere /ˈkjɛːdere/ "to ask": pr. chiedo /ˈkjɛːdo/, chiedi, chiede, chiediamo, chiedete, chiedono; p.p. ho chiesto /ˈkjɛsto/; impf. chiedevo; p.abs. chiesi /ˈkjɛːzi, ˈkjɛːsi/, chiedesti; fut. chiederò; pr.sub. che chieda, che chiediamo; impf.sub. che chiedessi; imp. chiedi!, chieda!, chiediamo!, chiedete!; pr.pt. chiedente;
- chiudere /ˈkjuːdere/ "to close": pr. chiudo, chiudi, chiude, chiudiamo, chiudete, chiudono; p.p. ho chiuso /ˈkjuːzo, ˈkjuːso/; impf. chiudevo; p.abs. chiusi /ˈkjuːzi, ˈkjuːsi/, chiudesti; fut. chiuderò; pr.sub. che chiuda, che chiudiamo; impf.sub. che chiudessi; imp. chiudi!, chiuda!, chiudiamo!, chiudete!; pr.pt. chiudente;
- concedere /konˈtʃɛːdere/ "to grant, to allow": pr. concedo /konˈtʃɛːdo/, concedi, concede, concediamo, concedete, concedono; p.p. ho concesso /konˈtʃɛsso/; impf. concedevo; p.abs. concessi/concedei/concedetti, concedesti; fut. concederò; pr.sub. che conceda, che concediamo; impf.sub. che concedessi; imp. concedi!, conceda!, concediamo!, concedete!; pr.pt. concedente;
- condurre /konˈdurre/ "to lead": pr. conduco, conduci, conduce, conduciamo, conducete, conducono; p.p. ho condotto /konˈdotto/; impf. conducevo; p.abs. condussi, conducesti; fut. condurrò; pr.sub. che conduca, che conduciamo; impf.sub. che conducessi; imp. conduci!, conduca!, conduciamo!, conducete!; pr.pt. conducente;
- correre /ˈkorrere/ "to run": pr. corro /ˈkorro/, corri, corre, corriamo, correte, corrono; p.p. sono corso/-a /ˈkorso/; impf. correvo; p.abs. corsi /ˈkorsi/, corresti; fut. correrò; pr.sub. che corra, che corriamo; impf.sub. che corressi; imp. corri!, corra!, corriamo!, correte!; pr.pt. corrente;
- crescere /ˈkreʃʃere/ "to grow (up)": pr. cresco /ˈkresko/, cresci /ˈkreʃʃi/, cresce, cresciamo, crescete, crescono; p.p. sono cresciuto/-a; impf. crescevo; p.abs. crebbi /ˈkrebbi/, crescesti; fut. crescerò; pr.sub. che cresca, che cresciamo; impf.sub. che crescessi; imp. cresci!, cresca!, cresciamo!, crescete!; pr.pt. crescente;
- cuocere /ˈkwɔːtʃere/ "to cook": pr. cuocio /ˈkwɔːtʃo/, cuoci, cuoce, cuociamo/cociamo, cuocete/cocete, cuociono; p.p. ho cotto /ˈkɔtto/; impf. cuocevo/cocevo; p.abs. cossi /ˈkɔssi/, cuocesti/cocesti; fut. cuocerò/cocerò; pr.sub. che cuocia, che cuociamo/cociamo; impf.sub. che cuocessi/cocessi; imp. cuoci!, cuocia!, cuociamo/cociamo!, cuocete/cocete!; pr.pt. cuocente/cocente;
- dire /ˈdiːre/ "to say": pr. dico, dici, dice, diciamo, dite, dicono; p.p. ho detto; impf. dicevo; p.abs. dissi, dicesti; fut. dirò; pr.sub. dica, diciamo; impf.sub. dicessi; imp. di'!, dica!, diciamo!, dite!; pr.pt. dicente;
- dirigere /diˈriːdʒere/ "to direct": pr. dirigo, dirigi, dirige, dirigiamo, dirigete, dirigono; p.p. ho diretto /diˈrɛtto/; impf. dirigevo; p.abs. diressi /diˈrɛssi/, dirigesti; fut. dirigerò; pr.sub. che diriga, che dirigiamo; impf.sub. che dirigessi; imp. dirigi!, diriga!, dirigiamo!, dirigete!; pr.pt. dirigente;
- discutere /diˈskuːtere/ "to discuss": pr. discuto, discuti, discute, discutiamo, discutete, discutono; p.p. ho discusso; impf. discutevo; p.abs. discussi, discutesti; fut. discuterò; pr.sub. che discuta, che discutiamo; impf.sub. che discutessi; imp. discuti!, discuta!, discutiamo!, discutete!; pr.pt. discutente;
- dolere /doˈleːre/ "to ache": pr. dolgo /ˈdɔlɡo/, duoli /ˈdwɔːli/, duole, doliamo/dogliamo, dolete, dolgono; p.p. sono doluto/-a; impf. dolevo; p.abs. dolsi /ˈdɔlsi/, dolesti; fut. dorrò; pr.sub. che dolga/doglia /ˈdɔʎʎa/, che doliamo/dogliamo; impf.sub. che dolessi; imp. duoli!, dolga!, doliamo!, dolete!; pr.pt. dolente;
- dovere /doˈveːre/ "to have to": pr. devo/debbo /ˈdeːvo, ˈdɛːvo; ˈdebbo, ˈdɛbbo/, devi, deve, dobbiamo, dovete, devono/debbono; p.p. ho dovuto; impf. dovevo; p.abs. dovei/dovetti, dovesti; fut. dovrò; pr.sub. che debba, che dobbiamo; impf.sub. che dovessi; imp. devi!, debba!, dobbiamo!, dovete!; pr.pt. dovente;
- emergere /eˈmɛrdʒere/ "to emerge": pr. emergo /eˈmɛrɡo/, emergi /eˈmɛrdʒi/, emerge, emergiamo, emergete, emergono; p.p. sono emerso/-a /eˈmɛrso/; impf. emergevo; p.abs. emersi /eˈmɛrsi/, emergesti; fut. emergerò; pr.sub. che emerga, che emergiamo; impf.sub. che emergessi; imp. emergi!, emerga!, emergiamo!, emergete!; pr.pt. emergente;
- esigere /eˈziːdʒere/ "to demand": pr. esigo, esigi, esige, esigiamo, esigete, esigono; p.p. ho esatto; impf. esigevo; p.abs. esigei/esigetti, esigesti; fut. esigerò; pr.sub. che esiga, che esigiamo; impf.sub. che esigessi; imp. esigi!, esiga!, esigiamo!, esigete!; pr.pt. esigente;
- espellere /eˈspɛllere/ "to expel": pr. espello /eˈspɛllo/, espelli, espelle, espelliamo, espellete, espellono; p.p. ho espulso; impf. espellevo; p.abs. espulsi, espellesti; fut. espellerò; pr.sub. che espella, che espelliamo; impf.sub. che espellessi; imp. espelli!, espella!, espelliamo!, espellete!; pr.pt. espellente;
- esprimere /eˈspriːmere/ "to express": pr. esprimo, esprimi, esprime, esprimiamo, esprimete, esprimono; p.p. ho espresso /eˈsprɛsso/; impf. esprimevo; p.abs. espressi /eˈsprɛssi/, esprimesti; fut. esprimerò; pr.sub. che esprima, che esprimiamo; impf.sub. che esprimessi; imp. esprimi!, esprima!, esprimiamo!, esprimete!; pr.pt. esprimente;
- evolvere /eˈvɔlvere/ "to evolve": pr. evolvo /eˈvɔlvo/, evolvi, evolve, evolviamo, evolvete, evolvono; p.p. sono evoluto/-a; impf. evolvevo; p.abs. evolvei/evolvetti, evolvesti; fut. evolverò; pr.sub. che evolva, che evolviamo; impf.sub. che evolvessi; imp. evolvi!, evolva!, evolviamo!, evolvete!; pr.pt. evolvente;
- fondere /ˈfondere/ "to melt": pr. fondo /ˈfondo/, fondi, fonde, fondiamo, fondete, fondono; p.p. ho fuso /ˈfuːzo, ˈfuːso/; impf. fondevo; p.abs. fusi /ˈfuːzi, ˈfuːsi/, fondesti; fut. fonderò; pr.sub. che fonda, che fondiamo; impf.sub. che fondessi; imp. fondi!, fonda!, fondiamo!, fondete!; pr.pt. fondente;
- godere /ɡoˈdeːre/ "to enjoy": pr. godo /ˈɡɔːdo/, godi, gode, godiamo, godete, godono; p.p. ho goduto; impf. godevo; p.abs. godei/godetti, godesti; fut. godrò; pr.sub. che goda, che godiamo; impf.sub. che godessi; imp. godi!, goda!, godiamo!, godete!; pr.pt. godente;
- leggere /ˈlɛddʒere/ "to read": pr. leggo /ˈlɛɡɡo/, leggi /ˈlɛddʒi/, legge, leggiamo, leggete, leggono; p.p. ho letto /ˈlɛtto/; impf. leggevo; p.abs. lessi /ˈlɛssi/, leggesti; fut. leggerò; pr.sub. che legga, che leggiamo; impf.sub. che leggessi; imp. leggi!, legga!, leggiamo!, leggete!; pr.pt. leggente;
- mettere /ˈmettere/ "to put, to set": pr. metto /ˈmetto/, metti, mette, mettiamo, mettete, mettono; p.p. ho messo /ˈmesso/; impf. mettevo; p.abs. misi /ˈmiːzi, ˈmiːsi/, mettesti; fut. metterò; pr.sub. che metta, che mettiamo; impf.sub. che mettessi; imp. metti!, metta!, mettiamo!, mettete!; pr.pt. mettente;
- morire /moˈriːre/ "to die": pr. muoio /ˈmwɔːjo/, muori /ˈmwɔːri/, muore, moriamo, morite, muoiono; p.p. sono morto/-a /ˈmɔrto/; impf. morivo; p.abs. morii, moristi; fut. morirò/morrò; pr.sub. che muoia, che moriamo; impf.sub. che morissi; imp. muori!, muoia!, moriamo!, morite!; pr.pt. morente;
- muovere /ˈmwɔːvere/ "to move sth": pr. muovo /ˈmwɔːvo/, muovi, muove, muoviamo/moviamo, muovete/movete, muovono; p.p. ho mosso /ˈmɔsso/; impf. muovevo/movevo; p.abs. mossi /ˈmɔssi/, muovesti/movesti; fut. muoverò/moverò; pr.sub. che muova, che muoviamo/moviamo; impf.sub. che muovessi/movessi; imp. muovi!, muova!, muoviamo/moviamo!, muovete/movete!; pr.pt. muovente/movente;
- nascere /ˈnaʃʃere/ "to be born": pr. nasco, nasci, nasce, nasciamo, nascete, nascono; p.p. sono nato/-a; impf. nascevo; p.abs. nacqui /ˈnakkwi/, nascesti; fut. nascerò; pr.sub. che nasca, che nasciamo; impf.sub. che nascessi; imp. nasci!, nasca!, nasciamo!, nascete!; pr.pt. nascente;
- nascondere /naˈskondere/ "to hide": pr. nascondo /naˈskondo/, nascondi, nasconde, nascondiamo, nascondete, nascondono; p.p. ho nascosto /naˈskosto/; impf. nascondevo; p.abs. nascosi /naˈskoːzi, naˈskoːsi/, nascondesti; fut. nasconderò; pr.sub. che nasconda, che nascondiamo; impf.sub. che nascondessi; imp. nascondi!, nasconda!, nascondiamo!, nascondete!; pr.pt. nascondente;
- nuocere /ˈnwɔːtʃere/ "to harm": pr. nuoccio/noccio /ˈnwɔttʃo; ˈnɔttʃo/, nuoci /ˈnwɔːtʃi/, nuoce, nuociamo/nociamo, nuocete/nocete, nuocciono/nocciono; p.p. ho nuociuto/nociuto; impf. nuocevo/nocevo; p.abs. nocqui /ˈnɔkkwi/, nuocesti/nocesti; fut. nuocerò/nocerò; pr.sub. che nuoccia/noccia, che nuociamo/nociamo; impf.sub. che nuocessi/nocessi; imp. nuoci!, nuoccia/noccia!, nociamo/nuociamo!, nuocete/nocete!; pr.pt. nuocente/nocente;
- offrire /ofˈfriːre/ "to offer": pr. offro /ˈɔffro/, offri, offre, offriamo, offrite, offrono; p.p. ho offerto /ofˈfɛrto/; impf. offrivo; p.abs. offrii/offersi /ofˈfɛrsi/, offristi; fut. offrirò; pr.sub. che offra, che offriamo; impf.sub. che offrissi; imp. offri!, offra!, offriamo!, offrite!; pr.pt. offerente;
- parere /paˈreːre/ "to seem": pr. paio /ˈpaːjo/, pari, pare, paiamo, parete, paiono; p.p. sono parso/-a; impf. parevo; p.abs. parvi, paresti; fut. parrò; pr.sub. che paia, che paiamo; impf.sub. che paressi; no imp.; pr.pt. parvente;
- piacere /pjaˈtʃeːre/ "to be liked": pr. piaccio, piaci, piace, piacciamo, piacete, piacciono; p.p. sono piaciuto/-a; impf. piacevo; p.abs. piacqui /ˈpjakkwi/, piacesti; fut. piacerò; pr.sub. che piaccia, che piacciamo; impf.sub. che piacessi; imp. piaci!, piaccia!, piacciamo!, piacete!; pr.pt. piacente;
- piangere /ˈpjandʒere/ "to weep, to cry": pr. piango, piangi, piange, piangiamo, piangete, piangono; p.p. ho pianto; impf. piangevo; p.abs. piansi, piangesti; fut. piangerò; pr.sub. che pianga, che piangiamo; impf.sub. che piangessi; imp. piangi!, pianga!, piangiamo!, piangete!; pr.pt. piangente;
- porgere /ˈpɔrdʒere/ "to extend, to hand": pr. porgo /ˈpɔrɡo/, porgi /ˈpɔrdʒi/, porge, porgiamo, porgete, porgono; p.p. ho porto /ˈpɔrto/; impf. porgevo; p.abs. porsi /ˈpɔrsi/, porgesti; fut. porgerò; pr.sub. che porga, che porgiamo; impf.sub. che porgessi; imp. porgi!, porga!, porgiamo!, porgete!; pr.pt. porgente;
- porre /ˈporre/ "to put": pr. pongo /ˈpoŋɡo/, poni /ˈpoːni/, pone, poniamo, ponete, pongono; p.p. ho posto /ˈposto/; impf. ponevo; p.abs. posi /ˈpoːzi, ˈpoːsi/, ponesti; fut. porrò; pr.sub. che ponga, che poniamo; impf.sub. che ponessi; imp. poni!, ponga!, poniamo!, ponete!; pr.pt. ponente;
- potere /poˈteːre/ "to be able (to)": pr. posso /ˈpɔsso/, puoi /ˈpwɔi/, può, possiamo, potete, possono; p.p. ho potuto; impf. potevo; p.abs. potei, potesti; fut. potrò; pr.sub. che possa, che possiamo; impf.sub. che potessi; imp. possi!, possa!, possiamo!, possiate!; pr.pt. potente;
- prendere /ˈprɛndere/ "to take": pr. prendo /ˈprɛndo/, prendi, prende, prendiamo, prendete, prendono; p.p. ho preso /ˈpreːzo, ˈpreːso/; impf. prendevo; p.abs. presi, prendesti; fut. prenderò; pr.sub. che prenda, che prendiamo; impf.sub. che prendessi; imp. prendi!, prenda!, prendiamo!, prendete!; pr.pt. prendente;
- redimere /reˈdiːmere/ "to redeem": pr. redimo, redimi, redime, redimiamo, redimete, redimono; p.p. ho redento /reˈdɛnto/; impf. redimevo; p.abs. redensi /reˈdɛnsi/, redimesti; fut. redimerò; pr.sub. che redima, che redimiamo; impf.sub. che redimessi; imp. redimi!, redima!, redimiamo!, redimete!; pr.pt. redimente;
- rimanere /rimaˈneːre/ "to stay, to remain": pr. rimango, rimani, rimane, rimaniamo, rimanete, rimangono; p.p. sono rimasto/-a; impf. rimanevo; p.abs. rimasi, rimanesti; fut. rimarrò; pr.sub. che rimanga, che rimaniamo; impf.sub. che rimanessi; imp. rimani!, rimanga!, rimaniamo, rimanete!; pr.pt. rimanente;
- risolvere /riˈsɔlvere/ "to solve": pr. risolvo /riˈsɔlvo/, risolvi, risolve, risolviamo, risolvete, risolvono; p.p. ho risolto /riˈsɔlto/; impf. risolvevo; p.abs. risolsi /riˈsɔlsi/, risolvesti; fut. risolverò; pr.sub. che risolva, che risolviamo; impf.sub. che risolvessi; imp. risolvi!, risolva!, risolviamo!, risolvete!; pr.pt. risolvente;
- rompere /ˈrompere/ "to break (down)": pr. rompo /ˈrompo/, rompi, rompe, rompiamo, rompete, rompono; p.p. ho rotto /ˈrotto/; impf. rompevo; p.abs. ruppi, rompesti; fut. romperò; pr.sub. che rompa, che rompiamo; impf.sub. che rompessi; imp. rompi!, rompa!, rompiamo!, rompete!; pr.pt. rompente;
- salire /saˈliːre/ "to go up": pr. salgo, sali, sale, saliamo, salite, salgono; p.p. sono salito/-a; impf. salivo; p.abs. salii, salisti; fut. salirò; pr.sub. che salga, che saliamo; impf.sub. che salissi; imp. sali!, salga!, saliamo!, salite!; pr.pt. salente;
- sapere /saˈpeːre/ "to know": pr. so /sɔ/, sai, sa, sappiamo, sapete, sanno; p.p. ho saputo; impf. sapevo; p.abs. seppi /ˈseppi/, sapesti; fut. saprò; pr.sub. che sappia, che sappiamo; impf.sub. che sapessi; imp. sappi!, sappia!, sappiamo!, sappiate!; pr.pt. sapente;
- scindere /ˈʃindere/ "to divide, to sunder": pr. scindo, scindi, scinde, scindiamo, scindete, scindono; p.p. ho scisso; impf. scindevo; p.abs. scissi, scindesti; fut. scinderò; pr.sub. che scinda, che scindiamo; impf.sub. che scindessi; imp. scindi!, scinda!, scindiamo!, scindete!; pr.pt. scindente;
- scrivere /ˈskriːvere/ "to write": pr. scrivo, scrivi, scrive, scriviamo, scrivete, scrivono; p.p. ho scritto; impf. scrivevo; p.abs. scrissi, scrivesti; fut. scriverò; pr.sub. che scriva, che scriviamo; impf.sub. che scrivessi; imp. scrivi!, scriva!, scriviamo!, scrivete!; pr.pt. scrivente;
- scuotere /ˈskwɔːtere/ "to shake": pr. scuoto /ˈskwɔːto/, scuoti, scuote, scuotiamo/scotiamo, scuotete/scotete, scuotono; p.p. ho scosso /ˈskɔsso/; impf. scuotevo/scotevo; p.abs. scossi /ˈskɔssi/, scuotesti/scotesti; fut. scuoterò/scoterò; pr.sub. che scuota, che scuotiamo/scotiamo; impf.sub. che scuotessi/scotessi; imp. scuoti!, scuota!, scuotiamo/scotiamo!, scuotete/scotete!; pr.pt. scuotente/scotente;
- sedere /seˈdeːre/ "to sit": pr. siedo /ˈsjɛːdo/, siedi, siede, sediamo, sedete, siedono; p.p. sono seduto/-a; impf. sedevo; p.abs. sedei/sedetti, sedesti; fut. siederò/sederò; pr.sub. che sieda, che sediamo; impf.sub. che sedessi; imp. siedi!, sieda!, sediamo!, sedete!; pr.pt. sedente;
- sorgere /ˈsordʒere/ "to rise": pr. sorgo /ˈsorɡo/, sorgi /ˈsordʒi/, sorge, sorgiamo, sorgete, sorgono; p.p. sono sorto/-a /ˈsorto/; impf. sorgevo; p.abs. sorsi /ˈsorsi/, sorgesti; fut. sorgerò; pr.sub. che sorga, che sorgiamo; impf.sub. che sorgessi; imp. sorgi!, sorga!, sorgiamo!, sorgete!; pr.pt. sorgente;
- spegnere /ˈspeɲɲere, ˈspɛɲɲere/ "to turn off, to switch off": pr. spengo /ˈspeŋɡo, ˈspɛŋɡo/, spegni /ˈspeɲɲi, ˈspɛɲɲi/, spegne, spegniamo, spegnete, spengono; p.p. ho spento /ˈspento, ˈspɛnto/; impf. spegnevo; p.abs. spensi /ˈspensi, ˈspɛnsi/, spegnesti; fut. spegnerò; pr.sub. che spenga, che spegniamo; impf.sub. che spegnessi; imp. spegni!, spenga!, spegniamo!, spegnete!; pr.pt. spegnente;
- svellere /ˈzvɛllere/ "to eradicate": pr. svello/svelgo /ˈzvɛllo; ˈzvɛlɡo/, svelli, svelle, svelliamo, svellete, svellono/svelgono; p.p. ho svelto /ˈzvɛlto/; impf. svellevo; p.abs. svelsi /ˈzvɛlsi/, svellesti; fut. svellerò; pr.sub. che svella/svelga, che svelliamo; impf.sub. che svellessi; imp. svelli!, svella/svelga!, svelliamo!, svellete!; pr.pt. svellente;
- tenere /teˈneːre/ "to hold, to keep": pr. tengo /ˈtɛŋɡo/, tieni /ˈtjɛːni/, tiene, teniamo, tenete, tengono; p.p. ho tenuto; impf. tenevo; p.abs. tenni /ˈtenni/, tenesti; fut. terrò; pr.sub. che tenga, che teniamo; impf.sub. che tenessi; imp. tieni!, tenga!, teniamo!, tenete!; pr.pt. tenente;
- togliere /ˈtɔʎʎere/ "to remove": pr. tolgo /ˈtɔlɡo/, togli /ˈtɔʎʎi/, toglie, togliamo, togliete, tolgono; p.p. ho tolto /ˈtɔlto/; impf. toglievo; p.abs. tolsi /ˈtɔlsi/, togliesti; fut. toglierò; pr.sub. che tolga, che togliamo; impf.sub. che togliessi; imp. togli!, tolga!, togliamo!, togliete!; pr.pt. togliente;
- trarre /ˈtrarre/ "to draw, to pull": pr. traggo, trai, trae, traiamo, traete, traggono; p.p. ho tratto; impf. traevo; p.abs. trassi, traesti; fut. trarrò; pr.sub. che tragga, che traiamo; impf.sub. che traessi; imp. trai!, tragga!, traiamo!, traete!; pr.pt. traente;
- udire /uˈdiːre/ "to hear": pr. odo /ˈɔːdo/, odi, ode, udiamo, udite, odono; p.p. ho udito; impf. udivo; p.abs. udii, udisti; fut. udrò/udirò; pr.sub. che oda, che udiamo; impf.sub. che udissi; imp. odi!, oda!, udiamo!, udite!; pr.pt. udente;
- uscire /uʃˈʃiːre/ "to go out": pr. esco /ˈɛsko/, esci /ˈɛʃʃi/, esce, usciamo, uscite, escono; p.p. sono uscito/-a; impf. uscivo; p.abs. uscii, uscisti; fut. uscirò; pr.sub. che esca, che usciamo; impf.sub. che uscissi; imp. esci!, esca!, usciamo!, uscite!; pr.pt. uscente;
- valere /vaˈleːre/ "to be worth": pr. valgo, vali, vale, valiamo, valete, valgono; p.p. sono valso/-a; impf. valevo; p.abs. valsi, valesti; fut. varrò; pr.sub. che valga, che valiamo; impf.sub. che valessi; imp. vali!, valga!, valiamo!, valete!; pr.pt. valente;
- vedere /veˈdeːre/ "to see": pr. vedo /ˈveːdo/, vedi, vede, vediamo, vedete, vedono; p.p. ho visto; impf. vedevo; p.abs. vidi, vedesti; fut. vedrò; pr.sub. che veda, che vediamo; impf.sub. che vedessi; imp. vedi!, veda!, vediamo!, vedete!; pr.pt. vedente;
- venire /veˈniːre/ "to come": pr. vengo /ˈvɛŋɡo/, vieni /ˈvjɛːni/, viene, veniamo, venite, vengono; p.p. sono venuto/-a; impf. venivo; p.abs. venni /ˈvenni/, venisti; fut. verrò; pr.sub. che venga, che veniamo; impf.sub. che venisse; imp. vieni!, venga!, veniamo!, venite!; pr.pt. venente;
- vivere /ˈviːvere/ "to live": pr. vivo, vivi, vive, viviamo, vivete, vivono; p.p. sono vissuto/-a, ho vissuto; impf. vivevo; p.abs. vissi, vivesti; fut. vivrò; pr.sub. che viva, che viviamo; impf.sub. che vivessi; imp. vivi!, viva!, viviamo!, vivete!; pr.pt. vivente;
- volere /voˈleːre/ "to want (to)": pr. voglio /ˈvɔʎʎo/, vuoi /ˈvwɔi/, vuole, vogliamo, volete, vogliono; p.p. ho voluto; impf. volevo; p.abs. volli /ˈvɔlli/, volesti; fut. vorrò; pr.sub. che voglia, che vogliamo; impf.sub. che volessi; imp. vogli!, voglia!, vogliamo!, vogliate!; pr.pt. volente;
- volgere /ˈvɔldʒere/ "to turn, to change": pr. volgo /ˈvɔlɡo/, volgi /ˈvɔldʒi/, volge, volgiamo, volgete, volgono; p.p. ho volto, sono volto/-a /ˈvɔlto/; impf. volgevo; p.abs. volsi /ˈvɔlsi/, volgesti; fut. volgerò; pr.sub. che volga, che volgiamo; impf.sub. che volgessi; imp. volgi!, volga!, volgiamo!, volgete!; pr.pt. volgente;
- see all the other Italian irregular verbs in English Wiktionary and in Italian Wikipedia.

== Bibliography ==
- Berloco, Fabrizio (2018). The Big Book of Italian Verbs: 900 Fully Conjugated Verbs in All Tenses. With IPA Transcription, 2nd Edition. Lengu. ISBN 978-8894034813.
