= Martha Crago =

Canadian linguist

Martha Crago CM is the Vice-Principal of Research and Innovation at McGill University. She is an internationally known expert on language acquisition, specializing in studying language acquisition across languages and learner groups. Crago received a B.A. in sociology and anthropology from McGill University in 1968 and a Ph.D. in communication sciences and disorders from McGill in 1988. She was employed at McGill from 1971 to 2005 and the University of Montreal from 2005 to 2007. She was the Vice-president of Research at Dalhousie University from 2007 until accepting her current position. She has also served as a visiting professor at the Max Planck Institute for Psycholinguistics from 2005 to 2006. She was appointed as a Member of the Order of Canada in December 2017.

== Publications ==
- Evaluation of Minority-Language Children by Native Speakers, 1985
- Cultural context in communicative interaction of Inuit children, 1988
- Who Speaks What Language and Why? Language Use of Families in an Inuit Community, 1996

== See also ==
- Carl Borgmann
