= Romance plurals =

Plural nouns in the Romance languages

The plurals of the Romance languages and their historical origin and development are an important area of study in comparative and historical Romance linguistics. There are two general categories that Romance languages fall into based on the way they form plurals. Languages of the first category, belonging to Western Romance, generally employ a plural suffix morpheme -s (meaning the "sigmatic plural"). Languages of the second category, belonging to Italo-Dalmatian and Eastern Romance, form the plural by changing the final vowel of the singular form, or suffixing a new vowel to it (meaning the "vocalic plural").

There are various hypotheses about how these systems—especially the second—emerged historically from the declension patterns of Vulgar Latin, and this remains an area of much debate and controversy amongst scholars of Romance.

== Two types of plural marking ==
Romance languages can be broadly divided into two broad groups based on the historical trajectory that the pluralization of nouns, articles, and adjectives took.

In the first group, consisting of the Romance languages north or west of the La Spezia–Rimini Line (i.e. Western Romance), plurals are generally formed by the addition of the plural suffix /s/ (or a closely related sound e.g. /z/). For example, in Spanish:

- buena madre transl. good mother
- buenas madres transl. good mothers

In a few of these languages, such as modern spoken French and the Western Lombard varieties, the plural was historically formed this way, but further sound changes resulted in the elision of this final /s/ for most or all nouns, adjectives, and/or articles (though in French it is preserved in the orthography and in speech may resurface in some contexts; see liaison). In these languages, plural nouns may sometimes be distinguished by the form of articles, but not because they have an /s/ (e.g. Milanese el can/i can transl. the dog/the dogs).

The second group, consisting of the Romance languages south or east of the La Spezia–Rimini Line (i.e. Italo-Dalmatian and Eastern Romance), involves changing (or adding) the final vowel; for example:

- Italian: buona madre "good mother (sing.)" → buone madri "good mothers (plur.)"

== Latin ==
The following table illustrates the singular and plural forms of the first, second, and third declensions in Classical Latin.

	1st		2nd		3rd			
	bona "good (fem.)"		bonus "good (masc.)"		mater "mother"		homo "man"	
	sg.	pl.	sg.	pl.	sg.	pl.	sg.	pl.
nominative	bona	bonae	bonus	bonī	mater	matrēs	homō	homĭnēs
accusative	bonam	bonās	bonum	bonōs	matrem	matrēs	homĭnem	homĭnēs

The corresponding Proto-Romance forms are shown below: (Note: See Romance languages#Sound changes for a description of the regular sound correspondences between Classical Latin and Vulgar Latin.)

	singular	plural	singular	plural	singular	plural	singular	plural
nominative	ˈbɔna	ˈbɔnas (Note: formerly considered to be *bͻnε, as would be the expected derivation from Latin bonae, but this interpretation causes problems; see Proto-Romance#Accusative theory.)	ˈbɔnʊs	ˈbɔni	ˈmatre	ˈmatres	ˈɔmʊ	ˈɔmĭnes
accusative	ˈbɔna	ˈbɔnas	ˈbɔnʊ	ˈbɔnos	ˈmatre	ˈmatres	ˈɔmĭne	ˈɔmĭnes

== Origin of plural -s ==
The plural forms in -s in languages like Spanish (for example, buenas madres "good mothers", buenos hombres "good men") can be straightforwardly explained as descendants of Latin accusative forms in -as, -os and -es.

On the other hand, 3rd declension nouns and adjectives have -es in both nominative and accusative, however, so the -s plural for these words could derive from either case form. There is also evidence that Vulgar Latin may have preserved the nominative plural ending -as in the 1st declension, attested in Old Latin and replaced by -ae in literary Classical Latin. The Romance varieties that maintained the distinction between nominative and accusative cases in the medieval period (Old French, Old Occitan, Old Sursilvan) have forms in -s for both nominative and accusative plurals of feminine nouns of the first declension.

== Origin of vocalic plurals ==
There is debate over the origin of the plurals of Italian and Romanian, with some claiming that they derive from the Latin nominative endings -Ī -AE and others that they partly derive from the Latin accusative endings.

The Italian endings are -i (for nouns in -o, -e and masculine nouns in general), and -e (for feminine nouns in -a); the few remnants of the Latin neuter nouns in -um can take -a for the plural.

The nominative theory suggests that -i as the plural of nouns in -o and -e as the plural of nouns in -a are derived straightforwardly from nominative -Ī and -AE, respectively (it is known that AE > e in all Romance languages), and that the plural -i for nouns in -e is derived by analogy with the plural of nouns in -o. (The corresponding nominative form in Latin is -ĒS. With the loss of final /s/, singular and plural would both have -e, which is problematic and was rectified by borrowing -i.)

The accusative theory proposes that Italian -e derives from -as. One piece of evidence is that in Italian, masculine amico has plural amici with /tʃ/ (the expected palatal outcome before -Ī), but feminine amica has plural amiche, with /k/ that is unexpected if e < -AE, but expected if e < -ĀS. (The change AE > e occurred long before palatalization, hence /tʃ/ is expected here too. It is unlikely that this unusual distribution is due to analogy; if so, either /tʃ/ or /k/ would be expected in both plural forms.) Additionally, Old French feminine plurals end in -es in both the nominative and the oblique (accusative); this may be evidence in favour of a more general Proto-Romance replacement of -AE by -ĀS.

Additionally, the isolated Italian word dunque 'thus' corresponds to Sardinian duncas. Neither word can be derived from Latin DUMQUAM, and the isolated nature of the word means that analogical change is unlikely. Sardinian duncas suggests Proto-Romance *DUNQUAS, with dunque the expected outcome (even down to the unusual qu preceding e) if -AS > e.

The "accusative" theory essentially suggests:

1. Italian plurals are indeed derived from the nominative plural.
2. However, Proto-Romance had the feminine nominative plural -ĀS, not *-AE.
3. The following sound changes took place:
  1. /as/ > /ai/, /es/ > /ei/, /os/ > /oi/. (If the /s/ was pronounced as [ʃ], [ʂ], [ɕ] or [ç], this may have led to an off-glide [j] after the vowel, as occurs in Portuguese and Catalan.)
  2. In unstressed syllables, /ai/ > /e/, /ei/ > /i/. (However, /oi/ appears to have become /o/.)

The first of these changes is almost certain, given examples like tu stai 'you stand' < TŪ STĀS; Italian crai 'tomorrow' (archaic, literary or regional) < CRĀS; tu sei 'you are' < TŪ *SES; sei 'six' < SEX (probably Proto-Italian *sess). Note also noi 'we' < NŌS, voi 'you (pl.)' < VŌS. The second sound change is cross-linguistically extremely common. Furthermore, it explains a number of otherwise unexplainable forms in Italian:

- The plural -i corresponding to Latin -ĒS
- Verbal tu dormi 'you sleep' < Proto-Western-Romance /tu dɔrmes/ < TŪ DORMIS
- Verbal tu tieni 'you hold' < TŪ TENĒS
- Subjunctive (che) tu ami 'you love' < TŪ AMĒS

Indicative tu ami 'you love' < TŪ AMĀS is unexpected; we would expect *tu ame. However, tu ame is in fact attested in Old Tuscan. In this case, it appears that -i was generalized as the universal tu ending at the expense of -e. (Note the even more striking generalization of first plural -iamo, originally only the subjunctive form of -ere and -ire verbs.)

== See also ==
- Classification of Romance languages
- La Spezia–Rimini Line
