= La Spezia–Rimini Line =

Romance isogloss in Italy

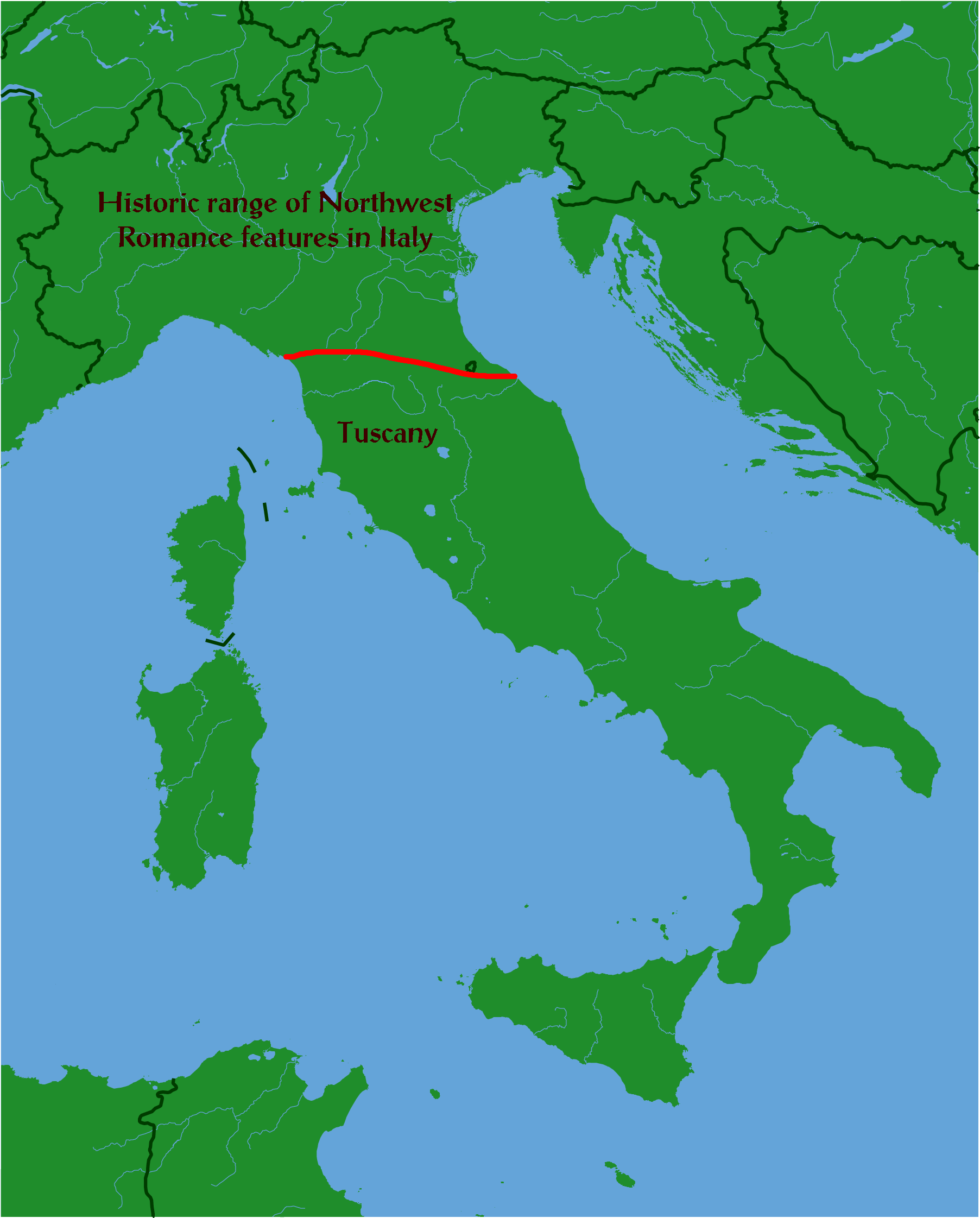
Historically, the La Spezia–Rimini Line marked a series of isoglosses that distinguished Gallo-Italic languages from central Italy, home of the standard Italian language.

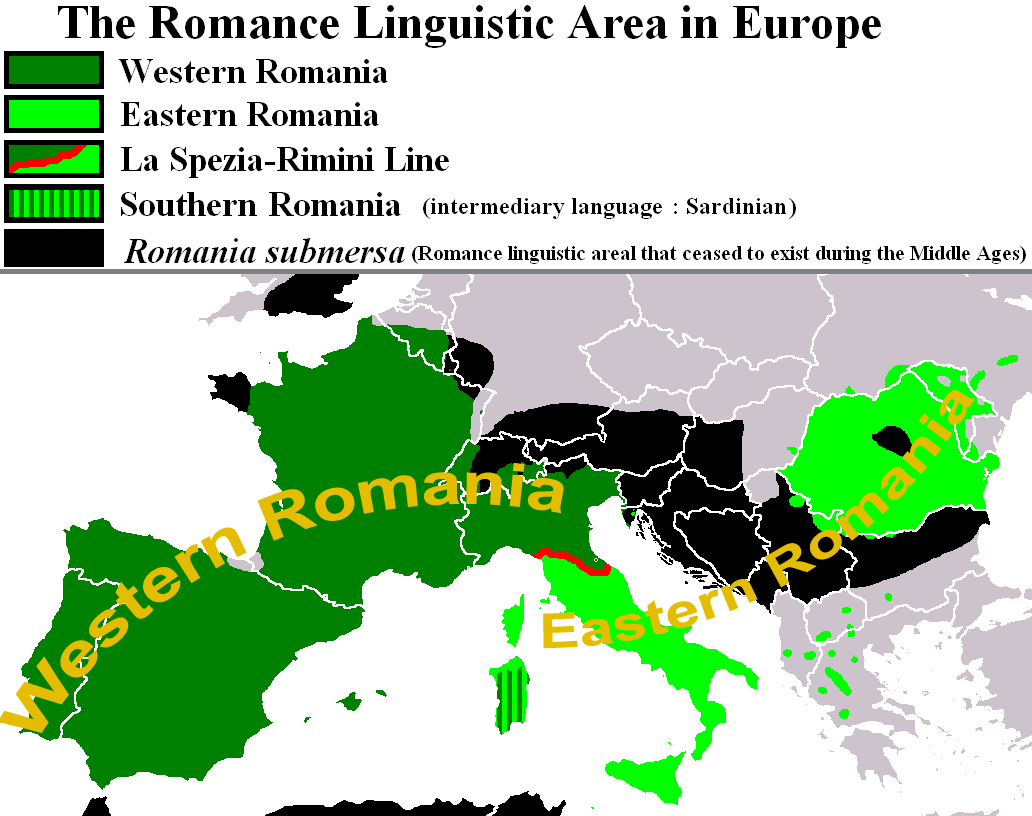
Eastern and Western Romania (Romance-speaking Europe)

In the Romance linguistics, the La Spezia–Rimini Line, also known as the Massa–Senigallia Line, is a line that demarcates a number of important isoglosses that distinguish Romance languages south and east of the line from Romance languages north and west of it. The line divides northern and central Italy, running approximately between the cities of La Spezia and Rimini (or, according to some linguists, between Massa and Senigallia, which lie about 40 kilometres further to the south). Romance languages south and east of it include Italian and the Eastern Romance languages (Romanian, Aromanian, Megleno-Romanian, Istro-Romanian), whereas Catalan, French, Occitan, Portuguese, Romansh, Spanish, and the Gallo‒Italic languages are representatives of the Western group. In this classification, the Sardinian language is not part of either Western or Eastern Romance.

It has been suggested that the origin of these developments is to be found during the last decades of the Western Roman Empire and the Ostrogothic Kingdom (c. 395–535 AD). During this period, the area of Italy north of the line was dominated by an increasingly Germanic Roman army of (northern) Italy, followed by the Ostrogoths; the Roman Senate and Papacy became the dominant social elements south of the line. As for the provinces outside Italy, the social influences in Gaul and Iberia were broadly similar to those in northern Italy, whereas the Balkans were dominated by the Byzantine Empire at this time (and later, by Slavic peoples). In either case, it coincides approximately with the northern range of the Apennine Mountains, which could have helped the development of these linguistic differences.

Generally speaking, the Western Romance languages have common innovations that the eastern Romance languages tend to lack. The three isoglosses considered traditionally are:

- the formation of the plural form of nouns – based on the Latin accusative case in Western Romance and on the nominative case in Eastern Romance;
- the voicing (in Western Romance) or not (in Eastern Romance) of some Latin voiceless consonants;
- the pronunciation of Latin c before front vowels as /(t)s/ (in Western Romance) or /tʃ/ (in Eastern Romance).

To these should be added a fourth criterion, generally more decisive than the phenomenon of voicing:

- preservation (in Eastern Romance) or simplification (in Western Romance) of Latin geminate consonants.

== Plural of nouns ==
North and west of the line (excluding the Gallo-Italic group) the plural of nouns was adapted from the Latin accusative case, and is marked with /s/ regardless of grammatical gender or declension. South and east of the line, the plurals of nouns are marked by changing the final vowel, either because these were taken from the Latin nominative case, or because the original /s/ changed into a vocalic sound (see the Romance plurals origin debate). Compare the plurals of cognate nouns in Aromanian, Romanian, Italian, Spanish, Portuguese, Catalan, French, Sardinian and Latin:

Eastern Romance			Western Romance					Sardinian	Latin		English
Aromanian	Romanian	Italian	Lombard	Spanish	Portuguese	Catalan	French	Sardinian	nominative	accusative	English
yeatsã yets	viață vieți	vita vite	vida vide	vida vidas	vida vidas	vida vides	vie vies	bida bidas	vīta vītae	vītam vītās	life lives
lupu lupi	lup lupi	lupo lupi	luv luv	lobo lobos	lobo lobos	llop llops	loup loups	lupu lupos/-us	lupus lupī	lupum lupōs	wolf wolves
omu uamini	om oameni	uomo uomini	om om	hombre hombres	homem homens	home homes/hòmens	homme hommes	ómine/-i ómines/-is	homō hominēs	hominem hominēs	man men
an anji	an ani	anno anni	an agn	año años	ano anos	any anys	an ans	annu annos	annus annī	annum annōs	year years
steauã steali/-e	stea stele	stella stelle	stella stelle	estrella estrellas	estrela estrelas	estrella estrelles	étoile étoiles	istedda isteddas	stēlla stēllae	stēllam stēllās	star stars
tser tseri/-uri	cer ceruri	cielo cieli	cel cei	cielo cielos	céu céus	cel cels	ciel cieux/ciels	chelu chelos	caelum caelī	caelum caelōs	sky skies

== Result of ci/ce palatalization ==
The pronunciation of Latin ci/ce, as in centum and cīvitās, has a divide between different affricates that roughly follows the line: Italian and Romanian use palatal /tʃ/ (as in English church), while most Western Romance languages use non-palatal /ts/ (later /θ/ or /s/). The exceptions are some Gallo-Italic languages immediately north of the line, as well as Mozarabic and (partially) Norman.

== Voicing and degemination of consonants ==
Another isogloss boundary that coincides with La Spezia–Rimini Line deals with the restructured voicing of voiceless consonants, mainly Latin sounds /p/, /t/ and /k/, which occur between vowels. Thus, Latin catēna ('chain') becomes catena in Italian, but cadeia in Portuguese, cadena in Catalan and Spanish, cadéna/cadèina in Emilian, caéna/cadéna in Venetian and chaîne in French (with loss of intervocalic [ð]). Voicing, or further weakening, even to loss of these consonants is characteristic of the western branch of Romance; their retention is characteristic of eastern Romance.

However, the differentiation is not totally systematic, and there are exceptions to the isogloss: Gascon dialects in south-west France and Aragonese in northern Aragon, Spain (geographically Western Romance) also retain the original Latin voiceless stop between vowels. The presence in Tuscany and elsewhere below the line of a small percentage but large number of voiced forms both in general vocabulary and in traditional toponyms also challenges its absolute integrity.

The criterion of preservation vs. simplification of Latin geminate consonants is more definite. The simplification illustrated by Spanish boca /ˈboka/ 'mouth' vs. Tuscan bocca /ˈbokka/, both continuations of Latin bucca, typifies all of Western Romance and is systematic for all geminates except /s/ (pronounced differently if single/double even in French), /rr/ in some locales (e.g., Spanish carro and caro are still distinct), and to some degree for earlier /ll/ and /nn/ which, while not preserved as geminates, did not generally merge with the singletons (e.g., /n/ > /n/ but /nn/ > /ɲ/ in Spanish, annus > /ˈaɲo/ 'year'). Nevertheless, the La Spezia–Rimini line is real in this respect for most of the consonant inventory, although simplification of geminates to the east in Romania spoils the neat east-west division.

Indeed, the significance of the La Spezia–Rimini Line is often challenged by specialists of both Romance dialectology and Italian dialectology. One reason is that while it demarcates preservation (and expansion) of phonemic geminate consonants (Central and Southern Italy) from their simplification (in Northern Italy, Gaul, and Iberia), the areas affected do not correspond consistently with those defined by voicing criterion. Romanian, which on the basis of lack of voicing, i-plurals and palatalisation to /tʃ/ is classified with Central and Southern Italian, has experienced simplification of geminates, a defining characteristic of Western Romance, after the rhotacism of intervocalic /l/.

== See also ==
- Joret line – Isogloss in northern France
- Jireček Line – Conceptual boundary between ancient Greek and Latin influences in the Balkans
- Classification of Romance languages
- Romance plurals
- Röstigraben
- Watford Gap

== Sources ==
Note that, until c. 1600, the word Lombard meant Cisalpine, but its meaning has been narrowed, referring now only to the administrative region of Lombardy .

- Adolfo, Mussafia (1873) Beitrag zur Kunde der norditalienischen Mundarten im XV. Jahrhunderte. Wien.
- Beltrami, Pierluigi; Bruno Ferrari, Luciano Tibiletti, Giorgio D'Ilario (1970) Canzoniere Lombardo. Varesina Grafica Editrice.
- Brevini, Franco (1984) Lo stile lombardo : la tradizione letteraria da Bonvesin da la Riva a Franco Loi. (Lombard style: literary tradition from Bonvesin da la Riva to Franco Loi.) Pantarei, Lugan.
- Brown, Peter (1970) The World of Late Antiquity W. W. Norton New York.
- Comrie, Bernard; Stephen Matthews, Maria Polinsky, eds. (2003) The Atlas of languages : the origin and development of languages throughout the world. New York: Facts On File. p. 40.
- Cravens, Thomas D. (2002) Comparative Romance Dialectology: Italo-Romance clues to Ibero-Romance sound change. Amsterdam: Benjamins.
- Hull, Dr Geoffrey (1982) The linguistic unity of Northern Italy and Rhaetia. PhD thesis, University of Western Sydney.
- Hull, Dr Geoffrey (1989) Polyglot Italy: Languages, Dialects, Peoples. Melbourne: CIS Educational.
- Maiden, Martin (1995) A linguistic history of Italian. London: Longman.
- Maiden, Martin & Mair Parry, eds. (1997) The Dialects of Italy. London: Routledge.
- Sanga, Glauco La lingua Lombarda, in Koiné in Italia, dalle origini al 1500. (Koinés in Italy, from the origin to 1500.) Bèrghem: Lubrina.
- Vitale, Maurizio (1983) Studi di lingua e letteratura lombarda. (Studies in Lombard language and literature.) Pisa : Giardini.
- Wurm, Stephen A. (2001) Atlas of the World’s Languages in Danger of Disappearing. Paris: UNESCO Publishing, p. 29.
