= Cisalpina =

Cisalpina may refer to:

- Gallia Cisalpina, the Italian name of Cisalpine Gaul, an ancient place name in the modern Italy
- Repubblica Cisalpina, the Italian name of the Cisalpine Republic, an ancient place name in the modern Italy
- Cisalpina Private Natural Heritage Reserve, a private natural heritage reserve in Brazil

== See also ==
- Cisalpine (disambiguation)
- Cernuella cisalpina, a species of snail
- ICQ Banca Cisalpina, a predecessor of FinecoBank
