= Cisalpin =

Cisalpin (French, derived from Latin - this side of the Alps, i.e. the Italian side of the Alps) may mean:

- Cisalpin, a typeface designed by Swiss typographer Felix Arnold for use in cartography
- The Cisalpin (train), which ran between Paris and Milan
- French ship Nestor (1793), which was renamed Cisalpin in 1797

== See also ==
- Cisalpine (disambiguation)
- Cisalpino
- Cisalpinism, a view in the Roman Catholic Church about the extent of papal authority
