= Ultramontanism =

Clerical political conception within the Catholic Church

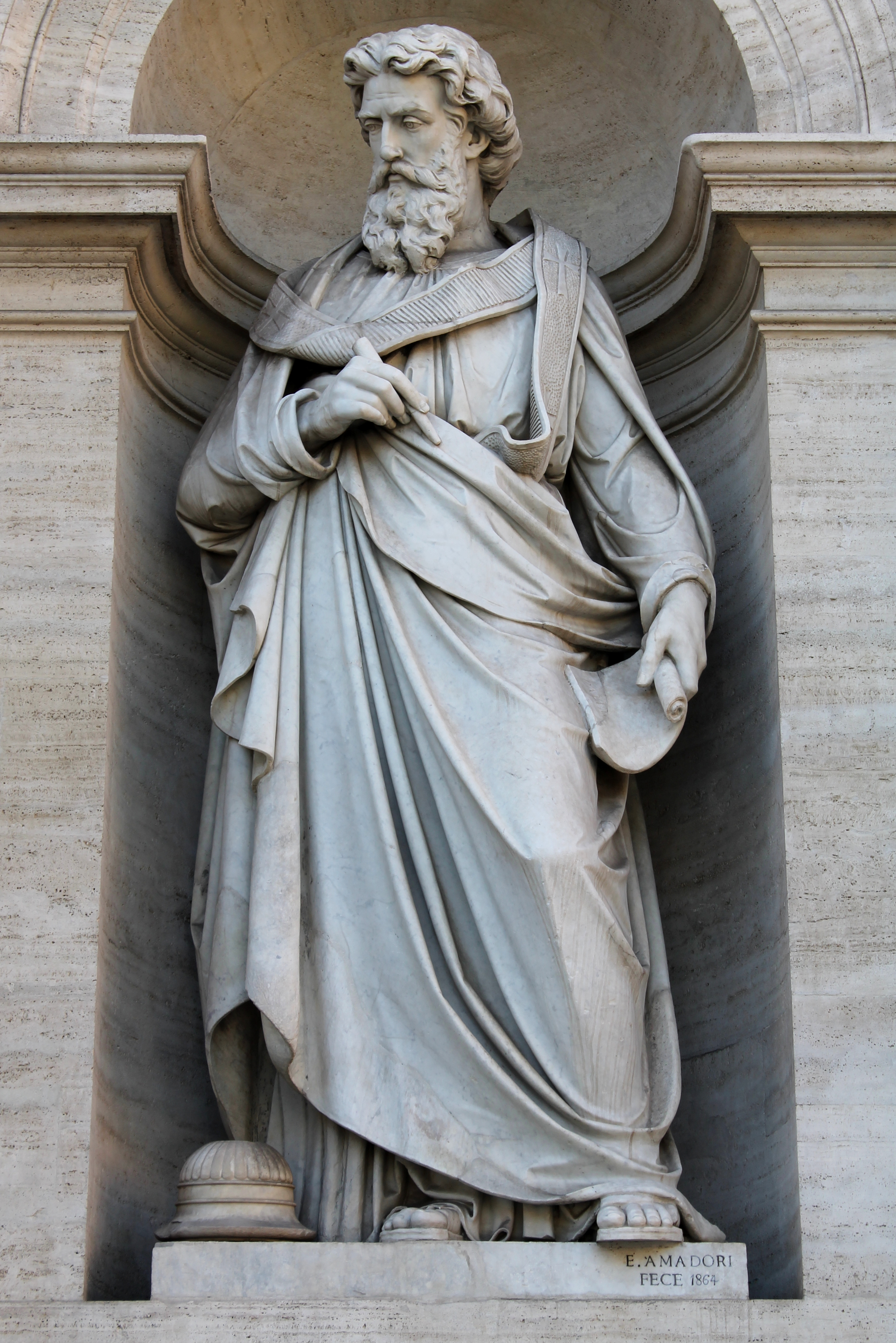
Statue of Pope Alexander I. Ultramontane Catholics emphasized the authority of the pope over temporal affairs of civil governments as well as the spiritual affairs of the Church.

Ultramontanism is a clerical-political conception within the Catholic Church that places strong emphasis on (and expresses loyalty to) the prerogatives and powers of the pope in matters related to civil state governance. It contrasts with Gallicanism, the belief that popular civil authority – often represented by the monarch's or state's authority – over the Church is comparable to that of the Pope.

== History ==
The term descends from the Middle Ages, when a non-Italian pope was said to be papa ultramontano – a pope from beyond the mountains (the Alps). Foreign students at medieval Italian universities also were referred to as ultramontani.

After the Protestant Reformation in France, the concept was revived but with its directionality reversed to indicate the man "beyond the mountains" in Italy: the pope. The term ultramontain was used to refer to Catholics who supported papal authority in French affairs – as opposed to the Gallican and Jansenist factions, who did not – and was intended as an insult implying lack of patriotism. From the 17th century, ultramontanism became closely associated with the Jesuits.

In the 18th century the term came to refer to supporters of the Church in any conflict between church and state. In Austria ultramontanists were opposed to Josephinism, and in Germany to Febronianism. In Great Britain and Ireland ultramontanists resisted Cisalpinism, which favored concessions to the Protestant state in order to achieve Catholic emancipation.

In eighteenth-century Spain, the Bourbon monarchs began implementing policies of regalism, which expanded the power of the monarchy and sought to bring the Catholic Church under its jurisdiction in all matters except the spiritual sphere. Charles III of Spain's ministers, Count of Floridablanca and the Count of Campomanes rejected the arguments of the ultramontanists that the Church had inalienable rights in the secular sphere. The regalist reforms that the Spanish crown sought to implement were not completely successful, and the resistance to them were attributed to support for the Society of Jesus, which had been expelled from the Spanish Empire in 1767, but prior to that were educators.

In Canada, the majority of Catholic clergy despised the French Revolution and its anti-clerical bias and looked to Rome for both spiritual and political guidance. There were many laymen and laywomen who supported these ideals as key to preserving Canadian institutions and values. For this reason they were called ultramontanists. The ultramontanes distrusted both the Protestant anglophone and francophone politicians, but the Church found it easier to deal with British governors, who appreciated the role of the Church in containing dissent, than with the francophone liberal professionals who were secularists.

== First Vatican Council ==
According to Catholic academic Jeffrey P. von Arx,

The threat to the Catholic Church and the papacy through the 19th century was real, and the church's reaction to that threat was understandable. Indeed, the church remained threatened on all sides. On the left, secular liberals sought to reduce or eliminate the role of the church in public life and civil society (by suppressing church schools, for example, and expelling religious congregations). The more radical heirs of the revolution and the socialists and communists into whom they evolved remained committed to the church's utter destruction. But the threat was also from the nationalist right. Otto von Bismarck's Kulturkampf was aimed directly at the Catholic Church, imposing state supervision of Catholic schools and seminaries and government appointment of bishops with no reference to Rome.

The response was a condemnation of Gallicanism as heretical:

[W]e condemn and reject the opinions of those who hold that this communication of the supreme head with pastors and flocks may be lawfully obstructed; or that it should be dependent on the civil power, which leads them to maintain that what is determined by the apostolic see or by its authority concerning the government of the church, has no force or effect unless it is confirmed by the agreement of the civil authority.

The council also asserted papal primacy. In July 1870, it issued the Dogmatic constitution Pastor aeternus, defining four doctrines of the Catholic faith: the apostolic primacy conferred on Peter, the perpetuity of this primacy in the Roman pontiffs, the meaning and power of the papal primacy, and papal infallibility.

[W]e teach and declare that, by divine ordinance, the Roman Church possesses a pre-eminence of ordinary power over every other Church, and that this jurisdictional power of the Roman Pontiff is both episcopal and immediate. Both clergy and faithful, of whatever rite and dignity, both singly and collectively, are bound to submit to this power by the duty of hierarchical subordination and true obedience, and this not only in matters concerning faith and morals, but also in those which regard the discipline and government of the Church throughout the world.

Von Arx compares this to "the great empires and national states of the 19th century, which used new means of communication and transportation to consolidate power, enforce unity and build bureaucracies". "Cardinal Henry Edward Manning in Great Britain thought unity and discipline within the church were of the utmost importance in protecting the church and advancing its interests in a liberal, democratic state, and so he was one of the strongest advocates of the ultramontane position." The English bishops at the council were characterized by their ultramontanism and described as "being more Catholic than the Pope himself".

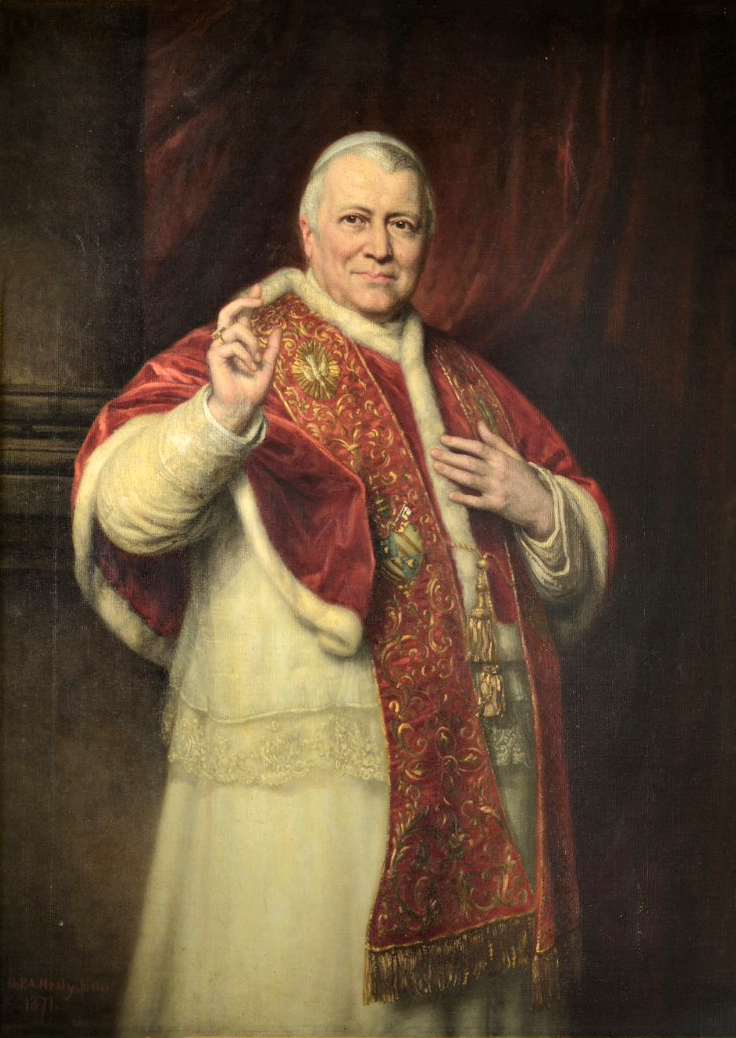
Pope Pius IX, who called the First Vatican Council

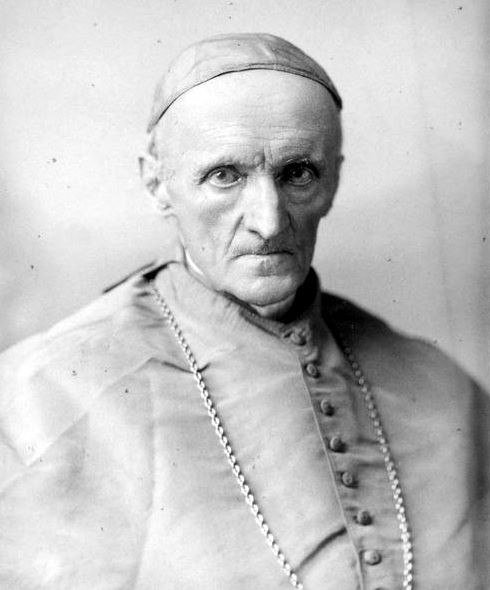
Cardinal Henry Edward Manning

=== Reaction ===
Other Christian groups outside the Catholic Church declared this as the triumph of what they termed "the heresy of ultramontanism". It was specifically decried in the "Declaration of the Catholic Congress at Munich", in the Theses of Bonn, and in the Declaration of Utrecht, which became the foundational documents of Old Catholics (Altkatholische) who split with Rome over the declaration on infallibility and supremacy, joining the Old Episcopal Order Catholic See of Utrecht, which had been independent from Rome since 1723.

As with previous pronouncements by the pope, liberals across Europe were outraged by the doctrine of infallibility and many countries reacted with laws to counter the influence of the church. The term "ultramontanism" was revived during the French Third Republic (1870–1940) as a pejorative way to describe policies that went against laïcité, a concept rooted in the French Revolution. The French philosopher Jacques Maritain noted the distinction between the models found in France and the separation of church and state in the United States in the mid-twentieth century. He considered the US model of that time to be more amicable because it had both "sharp distinction and actual cooperation" between church and state, what he called "an historical treasure" and admonished the United States, "Please to God that you keep it carefully, and do not let your concept of separation veer round to the European one."

After Italian Unification and the abrupt (and unofficial) end of the First Vatican Council in 1870 because of the outbreak of the Franco-Prussian War, the ultramontanist movement and the opposing conciliarism became obsolete to a large extent. However, some very extreme tendencies of a minority of adherents to ultramontanism – especially those attributing to the Roman pontiff, even in his private opinions, absolute infallibility even in matters beyond faith and morals, and impeccability – survived and were eagerly used by opponents of the Catholic Church and papacy before the Second Vatican Council (1962–1965) for use in their propaganda. These extreme tendencies, however, were never supported by the First Vatican Council's dogma of 1870 of papal infallibility and primacy, but were rather inspired by erroneous private opinions of some Catholic laymen who tend to identify themselves completely with the Holy See.

At the Second Vatican Council's Dogmatic Constitution on the Church Lumen gentium, the Catholic Church's teaching on the authority of the pope, bishops and councils was further elaborated. The post-conciliar position of the Apostolic See did not deny any of the previous doctrines of papal infallibility or papal primacy; rather, it shifted emphasis from structural and organizational authority to doctrinal teaching authority (also known as the magisterium). Papal magisterium, i.e. papal teaching authority, was defined in Lumen gentium No. 25 and later codified in the 1983 revision of Canon Law.

== Reception ==
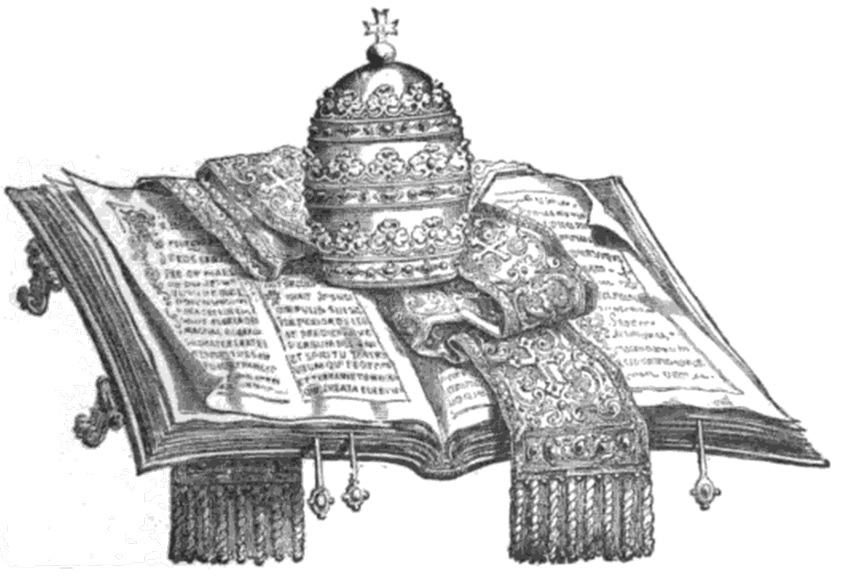
1881 illustration depicting papal infallibility

Some, such as the former Cardinal Joseph Ratzinger, have said the Catholic social teaching of subsidiarity can overrun ultramontanism and has the potential to decentralize the Catholic Church, whereas others defend it as merely a bureaucratic adjustment to give more pastoral responsibility to local bishops and priests of local parishes.

Challenges to ultramontanism have remained strong within and outside Roman jurisdiction. Ultramontanism has particularly overshadowed ecumenical work between the Catholic Church and both Lutherans and Anglicans. The joint Anglican-Roman Catholic International Consultation published The Gift of Authority in 1999, highlights agreements and differences on these issues.

== Position of other traditional churches ==
Ultramontanism is distinct from the positions adopted by the other traditional churches, particularly the Anglican communion, Eastern Orthodox communion, the Oriental Orthodox communion, the Old Catholic Church. These churches regard the pope as having been primus inter pares when the churches were united in full communion, and generally still acknowledge that status today, albeit in an impaired form due to disunity; similarly they do not recognize the doctrines of infallibility or the pope's alleged universal jurisdiction over patriarchates and autocephalous churches other than that of Rome itself, except insofar as this is part of the concept of primus inter pares.

In the joint agreed statement "The Gift of Authority" (1999) the Catholic Church and the Anglican Communion were agreed on the collegial nature of the life and work of bishops. Similarly both churches acknowledged the role of episcopal primacy within the college of bishops. On the question of the universal primacy of the Pope, the joint report found common ground, and stated that a "particular conclusion" of their discussions had been "that Anglicans be open to and desire a recovery and re-reception under certain clear conditions of the exercise of universal primacy by the Bishop of Rome"; nonetheless a clear distinction remained between the Anglican view of a universal primacy exercised within a universal collegiality, and the Catholic view of a universal primacy with actual universal jurisdiction.

== See also ==
- Caesaropapism
- Donation of Constantine
- Thomas Erastus
- Integralism
- Interdict
- Louis-Antoine Caraccioli
- Neo-ultramontanism
- Quanta cura
- Syllabus of Errors
- Temporal power (papal)
