= Western Romance languages =

Subdivision of the Romance languages

Western Romance
- Gallo-Iberian (Note: Western Romance is synonymous with Gallo-Iberian if Gallo-Romance and Ibero-Romance are considered the only primary branches. If not, then Shifted Western Romance is considered synonymous with Gallo-Iberian.)
- Geographic distribution: France, Belgium, Iberia, Northern Italy, Switzerland, Quebec, Latin America, Latin Africa, parts of Oceania and some parts of Asia
- Linguistic classification: Indo-European: Italic; Latino-Faliscan; Latin; Romance; Italo-Western; Western Romance
- Early forms: Old Latin: Vulgar Latin; Proto-Romance; Proto-Italo-Western Romance; Proto-Western Romance
- Subdivisions: Ibero-Romance; Gallo-Romance; Disputed branches: • Occitano-Romance • Pyrenean–Mozarabic • Rhaeto-Romance

Language codes
- Glottolog: west2813
- Classification of Romance languages

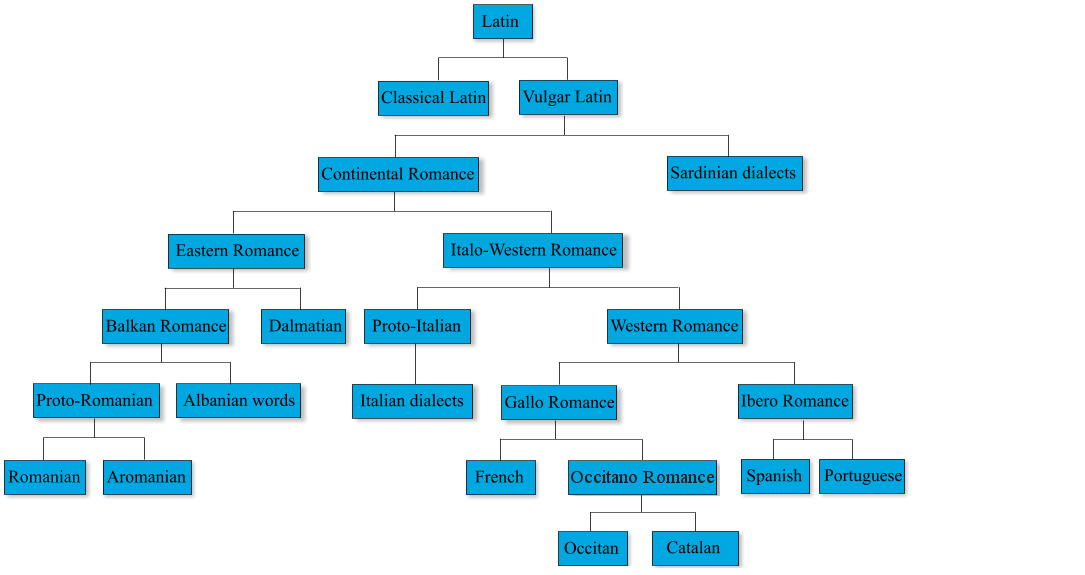
The Romance language family (simplified)

Western Romance languages are one of the two subdivisions of a proposed subdivision of the Romance languages based on the La Spezia–Rimini Line. They include the Ibero-Romance and Gallo-Romance. Gallo-Italic may also be included. The subdivision is based mainly on the use of the "s" for pluralization, the weakening of some consonants and the pronunciation of "Soft C" as /t͡s/ (often later /s/) rather than /t͡ʃ/ as in Italian and Romanian.

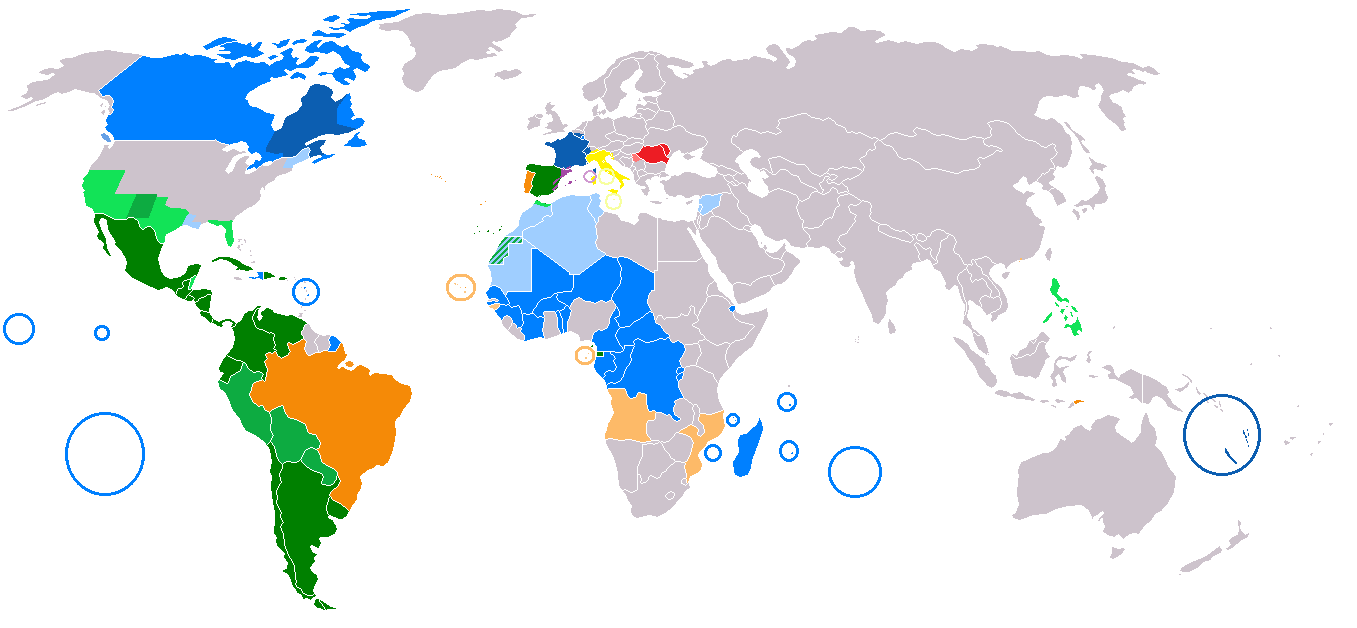
Romance languages in the world

Based on mutual intelligibility, Dalby counts thirteen languages: Portuguese, Spanish, Asturleonese, Aragonese, Catalan, Gascon, Provençal, Gallo–Wallon, French, Franco-Provençal, Romansh, Ladin and Friulian.

Some classifications include Italo-Dalmatian; the resulting clade is generally called Italo-Western Romance. Other classifications place Italo-Dalmatian with Eastern Romance.

Sardinian does not fit into either Western or Eastern Romance, having split off earlier than the two.

Today the four most widely spoken standardized Western Romance languages are Spanish (c. 486 million native speakers, around 125 million second-language speakers), Portuguese (c. 220 million native, another 45 million or so second-language speakers, mainly in Lusophone Africa), French (c. 80 million native speakers, another 350 million or so second-language speakers, mostly in Francophone Africa), and Catalan (c. 7.2 million native). Many of these languages have large numbers of non-native speakers; this is especially the case for French, in widespread use throughout Africa as a lingua franca.

== Gallo-Romance ==
Gallo-Romance includes:

- The Oïl languages. These include Standard French, Picard, Walloon, Lorrain, and Norman.
- The Arpitan language, also known as Franco-Provençal. It shares features of both French and the Provençal dialect of Occitan.
- The Occitan language, or langue d'oc, has dialects such as Provençal dialect, and Gascon dialect. Included also in on the Occitano-Romance.

Gallo-Romance can include:

- The Catalan language has standard forms of Central Catalan and Valencian. Can be classified as Occitano-Romance or East Iberian.
- The Rhaeto-Romance languages. They include Romansh of Switzerland, Ladin of the Dolomites area, Friulian of Friuli. Rhaeto-Romance languages can be classified as Gallo-Romance, or as an independent branch of the Western Romance languages.
- The Gallo-Italic languages. This group includes languages such as Piedmontese, Ligurian, Lombard, Emilian, Romagnol, Gallo-Picene, Gallo-Italic of Sicily, Gallo-Italic of Basilicata.

The Oïl languages, Arpitan and Rhaeto-Romance languages are sometimes called Gallo-Rhaetian, but it is difficult to exclude from this group Gallo-Italic, which, according to several linguists, forms a particular unity with Rhaeto-Romance.

== Iberian Romance ==
Iberian Romance languages of the Iberian Peninsula include:

- The West Iberian languages:
  - The Castilian languages: includes Spanish and Judaeo-Spanish.
  - The Galician-Portuguese languages: includes Portuguese, Galician and Fala.
  - The Astur-Leonese languages: they are, from east to west, Cantabrian, central-eastern Asturian and Leonese proper. Going from north to south, they are Leonese proper, Mirandese, Extremaduran
- The extinct Mozarabic. Sometimes classified as part of a Pyrenean-Mozarabic group.
- The Navarro-Aragonese languages. Sometimes classified as part of a Pyrenean-Mozarabic group.
- The East Iberian languages, such as the Catalan language and the Occitan language. Also classified as part of Occitano-Romance.

== Occitano-Romance ==
Sometimes considered a subgroup of one of the previous groups, it constitutes a group of languages that do not have all the Gallo-Romance traits or the Ibero-Romance traits. The list is as follows:

- The Occitan language, or langue d'oc, has dialects such as Provençal, Lengadocian, Lemosin, Auvernhat and Gascon-Aranese dialect.
- The Catalan language with two main dialectal groups, Eastern Catalan and Western Catalan, with the standard forms of Central Catalan and Valencian representing each dialect respectively.
