= Cisalpine =

Cisalpine is an adjective referring to the Italian side of the Alps. If may refer to:

- Cisalpine Gaul, an ancient Roman province
- Cisalpine Republic, a Napoleonic client state
- Cisalpine, a subdialect of Vivaro-Alpine within the Occitan language
- Cisalpine Gaulish, a variant of Gaulish language once spoken in the northern Italian area before the Roman age.
- Cisalpine Celtic, a sub-set of now extinct Celtic languages spoken in northern Italy, including Cisalpine Gaulish and Lepontic.

== See also ==
- Cisalpin (disambiguation)
- Cisalpino, Swiss railway company
- Cisalpinism, a view in the Roman Catholic Church about the extent of papal authority
