= Oceanian French =

Sociolinguistic map of Polynesian languages in the 21st century (in red: French as official language, lingua franca and/or mother tongue. Not included: Vanuatu, officially multilingual)

Oceanian French refers to the French language spoken in Oceania and all its local variants, as well as its different accents and vocabularies. French is spoken in French Polynesia, New Caledonia, Wallis and Futuna, and Vanuatu. In these different territories, the French language was brought by France, particularly through education and administration. In the 21st century, French is increasingly tending to supplant the vernacular languages.

== Background ==
=== A spreading language in Oceania ===
The presence of French in Oceania dates back to the second half of the 18th century, with the discovery of Micronesian, Melanesian and Polynesian islands by French explorers, notably Louis-Antoine de Bougainville and Jacques-Antoine Moerenhout.

France's colonial expansion in the 19th and 20th centuries was accompanied by the imposition of the French language in New Caledonia and French settlements in Oceania. For anthropologist Marie Salaün, this is specific to French policy: "French imperialism is unique, when compared to that of other European powers (...) in that it seems to attach essential importance to the French language as a vehicle for the “civilisation” that France seeks to spread (...) This hegemony of the French language, which goes hand in hand with an almost systematic negation of local languages, is, at first glance, a specifically French phenomenon".

In 2015, Oceania, with approximately 840,000 inhabitants of French-speaking countries or territories, represented about 0.3% of the total number of French speakers worldwide.

French is the only official language of French Polynesia (with 80% of the population speaking French in 2003), Wallis and Futuna (75% of the population speaking French in 2003) and New Caledonia (80% of the population speaking French in 2003) (all three territories of the French Republic). In Vanuatu, French is an official language and a lingua franca; in 2003, 30% of the population was French-speaking.

In some cases, French is an official language but not a mother tongue: Polynesian languages (Polynesia, Wallis and Futuna), Kanak languages (New Caledonia) and Oceanic languages (Vanuatu) are also spoken by the population.

=== New Caledonia ===
In New Caledonia, it was largely mining activity from the mid-19th century onwards that gave the French language a popular foothold, gradually replacing the English spoken since the early 19th century. The French spoken in the mines can be reduced to a schematic opposition between so-called ‘standard’ French and regional French. Language practices are largely influenced by the jobs held. A ‘convict’ slang, linked to mining, is attested in the 1890s; this slang has had a strong influence to this day.

From the 1890s until 1924, mining continued to shape French-speaking New Caledonia. From 1891 to 1895, convicts, who were considered too expensive, were replaced by the first contract workers: Vietnamese, Indonesians, Japanese, and then New Hebrides. These non-French speakers arrived in waves and contributed to the "pidginisation" of New Caledonian French.

From 1970 onwards, due to the boom in demand and production of nickel, people from Wallis and Futuna and Tahiti were encouraged to emigrate to New Caledonia, bringing their Polynesian languages with them.

=== Vanuatu ===
The use of French in Vanuatu began with French missionaries. Since independence in 1980, French has been one of the official languages.

It is the most linguistically diverse country in the world, with 265,000 inhabitants speaking more than a hundred different languages.

French state support for the Vanuatu education system since the 1960s and 1970s has enabled a large proportion of the population to learn French from an early age. Vanuatu has thus inherited two separate and parallel school systems (French-speaking and English-speaking). Funding by one or other colonial authority for its own school system has since fluctuated, rising or falling according to the gains or losses of political parties aligned with either the French-speaking or English-speaking communities. In 1980, the year of independence, the number of pupils attending French schools represented around 50% of the school-age population. However, by 1990, enrolment in French schools had fallen to less than 40% of all pupils. This percentage has remained broadly stable over the decades. Jacques Leclerc (Université Laval, Québec) estimates that at least one third of the Vanuatu population speaks French.

=== Tahiti and French Polynesia ===
The French spoken in French Polynesia has two main spheres of influence: the Îles sous le vent and the Marquises.

The Marquises archipelago underwent a later and slower process of Frenchification than Western Polynesia (the "Leeward Islands"), and French-language education at all levels (primary and secondary, private and public) was the main instrument of social and administrative progress. At no stage in 19th-century public education were Tahitian, Marquesan or other Polynesian languages taught in the classroom. The use of these vernacular languages was also prohibited during breaks, in order to ensure that pupils acquired a practical and rapid knowledge of French and to prevent it from becoming a language with no possible use in everyday life.

Historically, the Demis are an ethnocultural group typical of Polynesian Francophone particularism.

=== Wallis and Futuna ===
Interview of a Wallisian spaking French and wallisian

French was gradually introduced to Wallis and Futuna from the 1840s onwards, when religious orders established evangelical missions there. However, the missionaries did most of their teaching in Wallisian and Futunian, as well as in Latin. The territory became a protectorate in 1888, but the population continued to speak their mother tongue and only a few Europeans spoke French. It was not until 1961 and the transformation of Wallis and Futuna into an overseas territory that French took on an increasingly important role with the introduction of French-language education. In the 2010s, the majority of inhabitants are bilingual and young people tend to mix their mother tongue with French.

== Contemporary sociolinguistic situation (2000s) ==
=== French Polynesia ===
Over the centuries, more and more words from Polynesian languages have been added to the French lexicon. In the eastern part of French-speaking Oceania, there is a natural tendency to pronounce rolled ‘r’s (/r/), influenced by Tahitian and Eastern Polynesian languages.

French Polynesia

In 2012, the Statistical Institute of French Polynesia (ISPF) reported that 94.9% of people aged 15 and over could understand, speak, read and write French (94.7% in 2007), while 73.5% of these same people could understand, speak, read and write one of the Polynesian languages (74.6% in 2007). Among this population aged 15 and over, the language most spoken at home was French for 70.0% (68.5% in 2007 and 60.8% in 2002) and one of the Polynesian languages for 28.2% (29.9% in 2007 and 31.7% in 2002) (mainly Tahitian with 23.1%)

In French Polynesia, Tahitian words such as motu (island), api (new), popaa (European), tinito (Chinese), poti marara (bonito), uru (breadfruit), tane (man), vahine (woman), fare (house), etc. have become part of the everyday vocabulary of Polynesians. Conversely, French has influenced Tahitian words such as peretiteni (president) and porotetani (Protestant).

=== New Caledonia ===
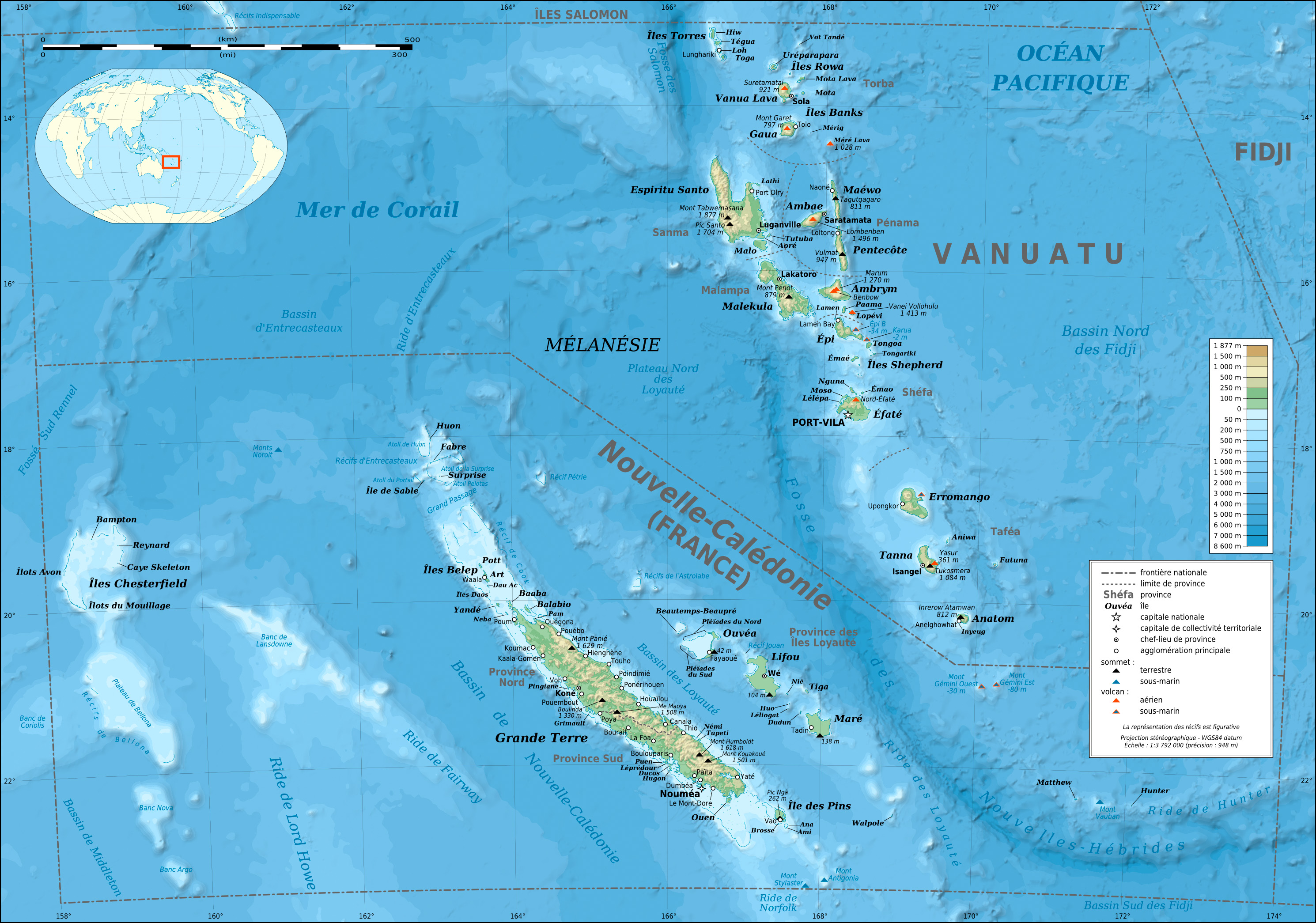
New Caledonia and Vanuatu

The French language in New Caledonia is strongly influenced by hundreds of years of diglossia with the Kanak languages, by the "Bagnard" and Caldoche cultures, as well as by Anglo-Saxon and Asian influences. According to researchers and linguists Mireille Darot and Christine Pauleau:

Le français des Calédoniens d'origine européenne se caractérise par l'usage de gros mots (désignant l'organe sexuel masculin ou référant à l'homosexualité passive) comme insultes et interjections, marqueurs de solidarité entre locuteurs masculins, démarcatifs et supports de différentes locutions. Relevant du stéréotype, leur emploi contribue à définir une identité linguistique au sein de la francophonie. Leur valeur est envisagée en termes de continuum dans la variation du français en France et hors de France. Elle est en relation avec l'origine bagnarde de nombre d'ancêtres des francophones de Nouvelle-Calédonie et avec des pratiques langagières de sociétés à tradition orale comme les parentés à plaisanterie

Many words of Kanak origin have entered into common usage in spoken French in New Caledonia. Examples include: popinée (indigenous woman), tayo (indigenous Caledonian), takata (witch doctor), nata (storyteller, narrator), manou (European loincloth), piré (market between Kanaks), tabou (local sculpture), kagou (endemic bird), baille (the sea), kakoun (violent blow), dégomatter (to knock something down), doghi (sorcerer), etc.

Nowadays, there is constant creative movement in the French lexicon of New Caledonia, with new lexical units being created all the time. Examples: ‘poisson la mer’ for ‘fish caught in the lagoon’ and ‘poisson la boîte’ for ‘fish bought in a shop’ are two expressions that reflect the mixed everyday French used in New Caledonia.

=== Wallis and Futuna ===
Wallis-et-Futuna

Proficiency in French is fairly widespread among the population: 83% of inhabitants speak it and 78% write it fluently.

Although French is taught in schools in Wallis and Futuna in much the same way as in mainland France, the French spoken in Wallis and Futuna may be influenced by the syntax of Wallisian or Futunian. In terms of the influence of vernacular languages on French: great functional flexibility (omnipredicativity and omnisubstantivity) despite rich derivation processes, the absence of the auxiliary verbs ‘être’ and ‘avoir’, the existence of different types of possession, nominal and numerical classifiers, a split actantial structure (accusative and ergative) depending on the verbal class, a very rich pronominal system, and the frequent use of nominalised constructions.

=== Vanuatu ===
As the only other independent French-speaking country in the Pacific (alongside France) and a full member of the International Organisation de la Francophonie (OIF), Vanuatu represents a territory of co-development for the French-speaking world, in a partially English-speaking regional environment.

France and Quebec maintain constructive ties with Vanuatu, particularly in terms of educational collaboration and the establishment of educational programmes in conjunction with French universities and the Agence universitaire de la Francophonie (AUF), based in Montreal. Port Vila, the country's capital, is home to the AUF's digital campus in Oceania.

Since 2010, the Vanuatu authorities have been working with the AUF to set up French-language distance learning programmes at university and pre-university level. A bachelor's degree in economic and social administration was launched in 2013, in collaboration with the AUF, Toulouse-I University and the French Embassy. These courses are aimed at secondary school graduates. Previously, these students had no choice but to continue their studies in English at the University of the South Pacific (Université du Pacifique Sud) annex in Port Vila or to go to another French-speaking country in Polynesia or beyond.

== External pages ==
- La Nouvelle Calédonie
- Atlas linguistique de Polynésie française
