= Latin Africa =

Region in Africa

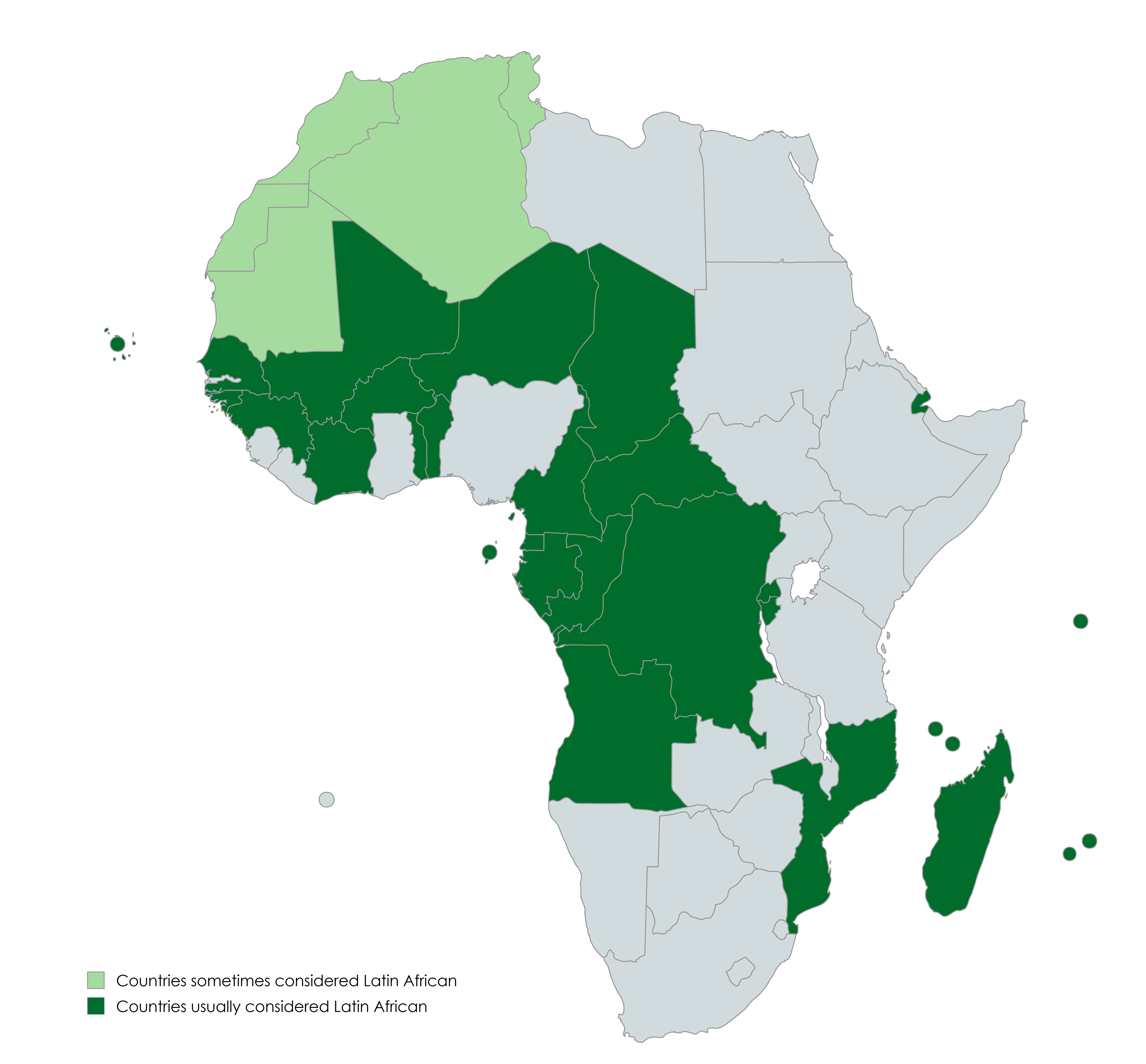
Latin African Countries 2026

Latin Africa refers to the linguistic and cultural region of African countries that speak a Romance Language. The languages spoken are primarily French and Portuguese. These countries either have a Romance language as an official language, or an administrative language. Increasingly, the Romance languages are being spoken as native languages in large metropolitan areas. Latin Africa has various sub-divisions, including the largest sections that are Francophone African and Lusophone Africa.

The term was first used by Andre Fribourg in 1922, with his book "L'Afrique latine". In this book, this term only referred to Morocco, Algeria and Tunisia.

The term was later used by Barthélémy Boganda in the 1950s. His idea of a united group of Romance speaking nations was called the United States of Latin Africa. While the term was not widely used after his death, in the early 2020's, the term has been picked up by YouTubers and online commentators. This was in response to social media backlash regarding who is and who isn't 'Latino".

The name Latin Africa was also used by Fidel Castro, in an attempt to draw similarities between Cuba and Angola.

The terminology has also been used in comparison to Latin America by academics.

Other international organizations, such as the Latin Union, have given support for this term as they included Romance Language speaking countries in Africa in the organization.

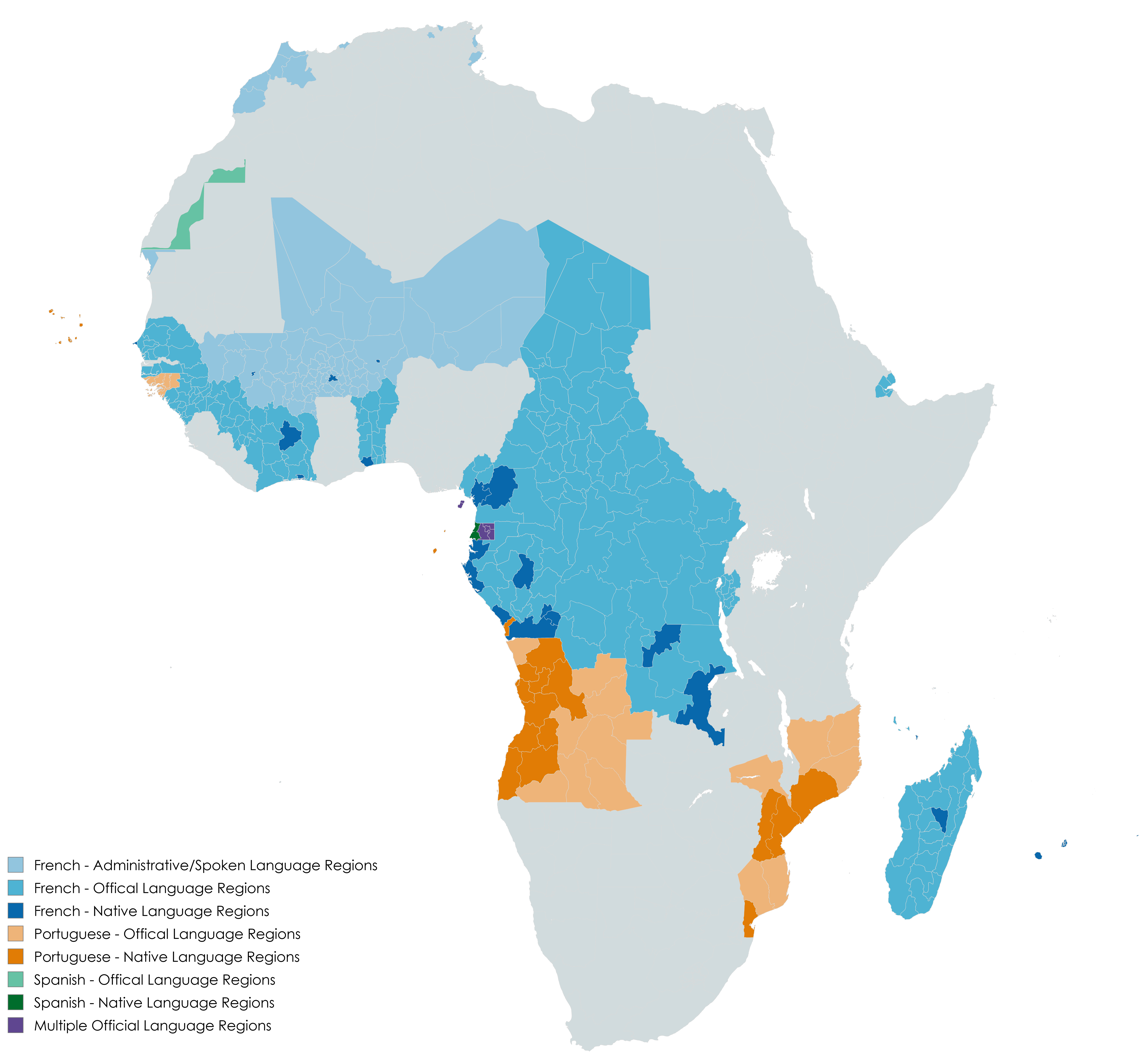
Breakdown of Latin African Countries by Language

== Francophone Africa ==
Country	Total Population	Romance Language Speaking Population	Total Percentage	Year
Algeria	47,435,000	15,589,000	32.86%	2025
Benin	14,814,000	4,992,000	33.7%	2025
Burkina Faso	24,075,000	5,499,000	22.84%	2025
Burundi	14,390,000	1,250,000	8.68%	2025
Cabo Verde	527,000	52,000	10.83%	2025
Cameroon	29,879,000	12,267,000	41.06%	2025
Central African Republic	5,513,000	1,345,000	24.39%	2025
Chad	21,004,000	2,693,000	12.82%	2025
Comoros	883,000	333,000	37.73%	2025
Congo	6,484,000	3,981,000	61.4%	2025
Côte d'Ivoire	32,712,000	11,913,000	36.42%	2025
Djibouti	1,184,000	592,000	50%	2025
DR Congo	112,832,000	57,196,000	50.69%	2025
Egypt	118,366,000	3,573,000	3.02%	2025
Equatorial Guinea	1,938,000	560,000	28.91%	2025
Gabon	2,593,000	1,719,000	66.3%	2025
Gambia	2,822,000	564,000	20.00%	2025
Ghana	35,064,000	645,000	1.84%	2025
Guinea	15,100,000	4,202,000	27.83%	2025
Guinea-Bissau				
Madagascar	32,741,000	8,705,000	26.59%	2025
Mali	25,199,000	5,028,000	19.95%	2025
Mauritania	5,315,000	689,000	12.96%	2025
Mauritius	1,268,000	921,000	72.65%	2025
Morocco	38,431,000	13,912,000	36.2%	2025
Niger	27,918,000	3,754,000	13.45%	2025
Rwanda	14,569,000	748,000	5.14%	2025
São Tomé and Príncipe				
Senegal	18,932,000	5,250,000	27.73%	2025
Seychelles	133,000	70,000	53.00%	2025
Togo	9,722,000	3,998,000	41.12%	2025
Tunisia	12,349,000	6,558,000	53.11%	2025

== Lusophone Africa ==
Country	Population	Area (km^{2})	GDP (nominal) per capita	Percentage of Lusophones
Angola	35,678,572	1.247.000	1.953,53	71%
Cape Verde	587,925	4.033	3.293,23	87%
Equatorial Guinea	1,468,777	28.050	14.637,01	Unknown
Guinea-Bissau	2,095,887	36.126	795,12	57%
Mozambique	20,069,738	801.590	466,557	60%
São Tomé and Príncipe	204,454	963.5	526,7	91%
Total	60,105,353	2,117,762	21,672,147	

== Hispanophone Africa ==
Country	Population	Size (km^{2})	Capital	Percentage of Spanish speaking population	GDP	HDI
Equatorial Guinea	1.468.777	28.051	Malabo	87%	25.988	145
Sahrawi Arab Democratic Republic	513.000	266.000	El Aaiún		25.988	20
