= Cisalpinism =

18th-century English Catholic movement

Cisalpinism (derived from "this side of the Alps") was a movement among English Roman Catholics in the late eighteenth century intended to further the cause of Catholic emancipation, i.e. relief from many of the restrictions still in effect that were placed on Roman Catholic British subjects. This view held that allegiance to the Crown was not incompatible with allegiance to the Pope.

== Background ==
With the deterioration of relations with the American colonies, the British government was faced with the necessity of increasing troop recruitments. While Catholic Relief Act of 1778 eased some provisions of the Penal Laws, its main purpose was to encourage the Catholic gentry to support enlistments. According to historian Thomas Bartlett, "It firmly established the principle of Catholic relief as a key element of war-time strategy." The passing of this act was the occasion of the anti-Catholic Gordon Riots (1780).

== Catholic Committee ==
=== First English Catholic Committee ===
Cisalpinism was more a political than theological position, directed toward helping the question of emancipation. It sought accommodation of the English Roman Catholic Church within the Protestant State in the 18th century, when the Penal Laws persecuting the Catholic Church were still in place. Thirty Catholic laymen met in 1782 to elect a "Catholic Committee" of five, for a period of five years, "to promote and attend to the affairs of the Roman Catholic body in England". According to the Secretary to the Committee, Charles Butler, "A variety of circumstances prevented them making any particular exertions in the cause entrusted to them."

The Committee first action was to write to the four Apostolic Vicars that one of the causes raised against further repeal of the penal laws was the title "apostolic vicar" and the perception of too close a dependence on the "Court of Rome". The Committee proposed the restoration of the hierarchy with the apostolic vicars becoming Bishops in Ordinary, governing their own dioceses. From the perspective of the actual working of ecclesiastical affairs, each of the Apostolic Vicars had a different opinion; and the matter was dropped.

=== Second English Catholic Committee ===
The powers of the first committee having expired at the end of its term in 1787, a new committee was constituted made up of ten members. In February, the Committee sent a letter to the Prime Minister protesting various prohibitions for which they suffered severe penalties. Among those listed were:

- keeping schools for educating their children in their own religious principles at home;
- sending their children abroad for education;
- practicing law;
- serving in the House of Commons;
- taking their hereditary seat in House of Lords;

and as loyal subjects, they petitioned for redress of their grievances.

In May 1788, the following year, the following members were added: James Talbot, vicar apostolic of the London district (although he never attended a meeting); Charles Berington, co-adjutor of the Midland district; and Joseph Wilks, a Benedictine monk.

Although it looked like a way to safeguard the English Catholic population, Bishop Charles Walmesley (1722–1797), the Vicar Apostolic of the west of England, thought Cisalpinism would mean a new oath of allegiance that would "exclude the Pope's spiritual jurisdiction" and "diminish our dependence in spirituals on the Church in Rome, and by degrees to shake it off entirely; likewise to take off the abstinence of Saturday, to reduce Lent to a fortnight before Easter, and to have the Liturgy in English".

The publication of the "Staffordshire Creed" by some Staffordshire clergy to Bishop Walmesley complained about the excommunication of the Benedictine Joseph Wilks. The creed also contained the Rights of the Priesthood against the Episcopacy, and this at a time when many Catholic laity were still being accused of treason.

In 1797 Bishop Walmesley publicly excommunicated the signatories of the "Staffordshire Creed". One of the defenders of the Cisalpine tradition who even objected to the Asperges (sprinkling of Holy Water) before Mass was John Lingard, author of the hymn Hail Queen of Heaven the Ocean Star and first Rector of Ushaw College seminary. Father Daniel Rock, chaplain to Lord Shrewsbury of Alton Towers from 1827 to 1841, continued for a short time elements of the Cisalpine tradition. It was the chance meeting at Alton Towers of Lord Shrewsbury with Father F. W. Faber that promoted Ultramontanism.

== Sources ==
- J A Hilton, Catholic Lancashire (1994)
- The London Oratory Centenary (1884–1984) Published 1984
- Fr Faber by G Chapman
- P McPartland, The Eucharist Makes the Church, published by T and T Clark 1983

== See also ==
- Cisalpine Club
- Ultramontanism
