= Lexical changes from Classical Latin to Proto-Romance =

Vocabulary of late (Vulgar) Latin not used in the prestigious/classical form

As Classical Latin developed into Proto-Romance, its lexicon underwent numerous changes.

== Regularization ==
Irregular nouns and verbs tended to be either regularized or replaced with preexisting regular equivalents. Cf. the loss of edere 'to eat' in favour of manducare or its own regularized compound comedere. Similar motives underlie the general replacement of ferre 'carry' with portare or loqui 'speak' with parabolare and fabulari.

== Semantic drift ==
Various words experienced a significant change in meaning, notable examples being causa ('subject matter' → 'thing'), civitas ('citizenry' → 'city'), focus ('hearth' → 'fire'), mittere ('send' → 'put'), necare ('murder' → 'drown'), pacare ('placate' → 'pay'), and totus ('whole' → 'all, every').

Certain words may have shed their originally lower-status or humble associations to become default unmarked terms, thus replacing the literary Classical equivalents. Cf. the general loss of equus 'horse' in favour of caballus (originally 'workhorse') or that of domus 'house' in favour of casa (originally 'hut').

== Loss of short forms ==
Words that were felt to be too short or phonetically insubstantial were liable to be replaced, often with their own derivatives, hence auris 'ear' and agnus 'lamb' were rejected in favour of their diminutives auricula and agnellus. This is most visible in the case of the word for today in French, aujourd'hui, a univerbation of au (itself being à and le) + jour + d' + hui, where hui is the descendant of Latin hodie and the whole lemma would instead roughly mean on the day of today.

Most Classical particles (such as an, at, autem, donec, enim, etc.) simply died out and survive nowhere in Romance.

== Coinages ==
There was a trend towards forming compound prepositions of the type ab ante, which at first simply combined the sense of their constituents (hence the original sense of ab ante was 'from before'). In time many would develop a generic sense, often simply that of one of their constituents (hence ab ante came to mean 'before', in competition with ante). Other examples attested in Late Antiquity are de inter, de retro, de foris, de intus, de ab, and de ex.

A number of verb-forming (or extending) suffixes were popularized, such as -icare (based on the adjective ending -icus), -ulare (based on the diminutive -ul-), and -izare (borrowed from Greek).

== Borrowing ==
Numerous foreign terms were borrowed into the Latin vernacular, a majority of which came from Greek, particularly in the domains of medicine, cooking, and Christian worship. A smaller fraction came from Gaulish or Germanic.

== Selected lexical comparisons ==
Meaning	Classical word	Inherited descendants (Note: Clearly borrowed words are not counted as descendants. This excludes, for instance, the Italian word igne 'fire, which was taken from Latin. List of abbreviations: Fr. — French (central) OOcc. — Old Occitan Occ. — Occitan (central) OCat. — Old Catalan Cat. — Catalan (central) Ara. — Aragonese OSp. — Old Spanish Sp. — Spanish (central) Ast. — Asturian OPt. — Old Portuguese Pt. — Portuguese (central) Lig. — Ligurian Pie. — Piedmontese Lmb. — Lombard (Milanese) Rms. — Romansh Frl. — Friulan Vgl. — Vegliote OIt. — Old Italian It. — Italian Srd. — Sardinian (Logudorese) Sic. — Sicilian Ro. — Romanian ARo. — Aromanian)	Competitor(s) in Proto-Romance	Inherited descendants	Origin
all	omnis	It. ogni	totus	Fr. tout, Oc. tot, Cat. tot, Sp. todo, Pt. todo, Srd. totu, It. tutto, Ro. tot	Meant 'entire' in CL.
before	ante	OIt. anti, Sp. ante	avante	Fr. avant, Occ. avan, Cat. abans, Pt. avante, Sp. avante, (Note: With the specialized sense of 'forward', cf. the Portuguese cognate.) It. avanti	Ab 'away from' + ante.
before	ante	OIt. anti, Sp. ante	inante	OPt. enante, OSp. enante, Vgl. aninč, OIt. inanti, Nea. 'nnante, Ro. înainte, ARo. nãnte	In + ante.
before	ante	OIt. anti, Sp. ante	antes	Sp. antes, Pt. antes	Ante + an adverbial analogical -s.
begin	incipere	Rms. entscheiver, Ro. începe(re)	comintiare	Fr. commencer, Occ. començar, Cat. començar, Sp. comenzar, Pt. começar, It. cominciare	Prefixed and syncopated version of LL initiare 'start', a verb based on CL initium 'beginning'.
bird	avis	Cat. au, Sp. ave, Pt. ave, Srd. ae	aucellus	Fr. oiseau, Occ. aucèl, Cat. ocell, It. uccello	Diminutive of avis.
bird	avis	Cat. au, Sp. ave, Pt. ave, Srd. ae	passarus	Sp. pájaro, Pt. pássaro, Ro. pasăre, It. passero	Alteration of CL passer 'sparrow'.
but	sed	—	magis	Aro. ma, It. ma, Nea. ma, Fr. mais, Occ. mai, Pt. mas, Sp. mas	Meant 'rather' in CL.
but	sed	—	per hoc	It. però, Cat. però, Pt. pero, Sp. pero	In CL meant "through this", by LL the meaning changed to "because of this, therefore".
cat	felis	—	cattus	Fr. chat, Occ. cat, Cat. gat, Sp. gato, Pt. gato, It. gatto	Late borrowing of obscure origin.
day	dies	Aro. dzuã, Ro. zi, Rms. di, OFr. di, It. dì, OOc. di, Srd. die, Mirandese die	diurnum	Fr. jour, It. giorno, Cat. jorn, Occ. jorn	Nominalization of CL diurnus "daily, of the day"
day	dies	Aro. dzuã, Ro. zi, Rms. di, OFr. di, It. dì, OOc. di, Srd. die, Mirandese die	dia	Sp. día, Pt. dia, OIt. dia, Cat dia, OOcc. dia	From CL dies, transferred to the first declension.
ear	auris	—	auricla~oricla	Fr. oreille, Occ. aurelha, Cat. orella, Sp. oreja, Pt. orelha, It. orecchio, Ro. ureche	Diminutive of auris.
eat	edere	—	comedere	Sp. comer, Pt. comer	Prefixed and regularized version of edere.
eat	edere	—	manducare	Fr. manger, Occ. manjar, Cat. menjar, Ara. minchar, OIt. manicare, It. mangiare, Ro. mâncare	Meant 'chew' in CL.
evening	vesper	Fr. vêpre, Occ. vèspre, Cat. vespre, Pie. vespr, Lmb. vèsper, Vgl. viaspro	sera	Fr. soir, Rms. saira, Vgl. saira, It. sera, Ro. seară	Likely a shortening of an expression such as sera dies 'late (part of the) day'.
fire	ignis	—	focus	Fr. feu, Occ. fuòc, Cat. foc, Sp. fuego, Pt. fogo, It. fuoco, Ro. foc	Meant 'hearth' in CL.
fight	pugna	—	lucta	Fr. lutte, Occ. lucha, Cat. lluita, Sp. lucha, Pt. luta, It. lotta, Ro. luptă	Noun based on CL luctari 'wrestle, struggle'.
fight	pugna	—	battalia	Fr. bataille, Occ. batalha, Cat. batalla, Pt. batalha, It. battaglia, Ro. bătaie	Alteration of earlier battualia, from CL battuere 'strike', an early borrowing from Gaulish.
from	a~ab	—	de	Fr. de, Oc. de, Cat. de, Sp. de, Pt. de, It. di, Ro. de	Meant 'down from' in CL.
help	iuvare	Frl. zovâ, It. giovare	adiutare	Fr. aider, Occ. ajudar, Cat. ajudar, Sp. ayudar, Pt. ajudar, It. aiutare, Ro. ajutare	Frequentative of CL adiuvare, a prefixed version of iuvare.
home	domus	It. duomo, (Note: With the specialized sense of 'cathedral'.) Srd. domu, Ro. dumesnic (Note: from 'domesticus.')	casa	OFr. chiese, (Note: Survives in modern French as chez, a grammaticalized expression meaning 'at the house of', cf. Catalan ca and Italian ca'.) Occ. casa, Cat. casa, Sp. casa, Pt. casa, It. casa, Ro. casă	Meant 'hut' in CL.
horse (m.)	equus	—	caballus	Fr. cheval, Oc. caval, Cat. cavall, Sp. caballo, Pt. cavalo, It. cavallo. Ro. cal.	Originally 'workhorse, nag'.
inside	intus	OFr. enz, Lig. inte	de intus	Fr. dans, Occ. dins, Cat. dins	De + intus, originally 'from within'. Attested in Late Latin.
inside	intus	OFr. enz, Lig. inte	de intro	It. dentro, Nea. dinto, Pt. dentro	De + intro, originally 'from within'. Attested in Late Latin.
kitchen	culina	—	coquina	Fr. cuisine, Occ. cosina, Cat. cuina, Sp. cocina, Pt. cozinha, It. cucina	Noun based on CL coquere 'cook'.
know	scire	Ro. știre, Srd. ischire	sapere	Fr. savoir, Occ. saber, Cat. saber, Sp. saber, Pt. saber, It. sapere	Meant 'taste' in CL, but with the secondary senses of 'understand' and 'be intelligent'.
lamb	agnus	Pt. anho	agnellus	Fr. agneau, Occ. anhèl, Cat. anyell, Rms. agnè, It. agnello, Sic. agneddu, Ro. miel	Originally simply the diminutive of agnus.
leg	crus	—	camba~gamba	Fr. jambe, Occ. camba, Cat. cama, OSp. cama, It. gamba, Ro. gambă	Late borrowing of Greek καμπή.
man	vir	—	homo	Fr. homme, Occ. òme, Cat. home, Sp. hombre, Pt. homem, It. uomo, Ro. om	Meant 'human being' in CL.
money	pecunia	ARo. picunj~piculj	denarii	Fr. deniers, Occ. dinèrs, Cat. diners, Sp. dineros, Pt. dinheiros, It. denari, Ro. dinari	Referred to a specific type of coin in CL, though was used as a metonym for 'money' in Cicero's letters.
mouth	os	—	bucca	Fr. bouche, Occ. boca, Cat. boca, Sp. boca, Pt. boca, It. bocca, Ro. bucă (Note: Only the Romanian word continues to mean 'cheek'.)	Meant 'cheek' in CL. Attested in the sense of 'mouth' already in the writings of Petronius.
narrow	angustus	Sp. angosto, It. angusto, Ro. îngust	strictus	Fr. étroit, Occ. estreit, Cat. estret, Sp. estrecho, Pt. estreito, It. stretto, Ro. strâmt	Meant 'tightened' in CL.
now	nunc	—	ora	Sp. ora, Pt. hora, It. ora	CL hora 'hour, time'.
now	nunc	—	adora	Fr. or, Occ. aüra, Cat. ara	Composed of CL ad + hora(m). Attested in the writings of Anthimus.
now	nunc	—	acora	Sp. ahora, Pt. agora	Composed of CL hac 'this' + hora.
old	vetus	OFr. viet, Sp. viedo, OPt. vedro, It. vieto	veclus	Fr. vieux, Occ. vièlh, Cat. vell, Sp. viejo, Pt. velho, It. vecchio, Ro. vechi	Alteration of CL vetulus, a diminutive of vetus.
right (Note: In the directional sense.)	dexter	OFr. destre, OOcc. dèstre, Cat. destre, Sp. diestro, Pt. destro, (Note: Today mostly obsolete in the directional sense, cf. the Spanish and Catalan cognates.) It. destro	directus~drectus	Fr. droit, Occ. dreit, Cat. dret, Sp. derecho, Pt. direito, It. diritto, Ro. drept	Meant 'straight' or 'level' in CL.
rope	funis	It. fune, Ro. funie	corda	Occ. còrda, Cat. corda, Sp. cuerda, Pt. corda, It. corda, Ro. coardă	Borrowing of Greek χορδή.
Saturday	dies saturni	—	dies sabbati	Occ. dissabte, Cat. dissabte	Lit. 'day of the Sabbath'.
Saturday	dies saturni	—	sambati dies	Fr. samedi, Rms. sonda	The same but reversed and with a nasal infix.
Saturday	dies saturni	—	sabbatu~sambatu	Sp. sábado, Pt. sábado, It. sabato, Ro. sâmbătă, (Note: Now a feminine word, likely influenced by zi (f.) 'day'.) Srd. sàpadau	Simply the word for 'Sabbath' on its own.
shirt	tunica	Cat. tonga, Sp. tonga, It. tonaca	camisia	Fr. chemise, Occ. camisa, Cat. camisa, Sp. camisa, Pt. camisa, It. camicia, Ro. cămașă	Late borrowing from Gaulish.
short	brevis	Fr. bref, Occ. brèu, Cat. breu, It. breve, Sp. breve, Pt. breve	curtus	Fr. court, Occ. cort, Sp. corto, OPt. corto, It. corto, Ro. scurt (Note: Derived from *ex-curtus.)	Meant 'cut short, mutilated' in CL.
sick	infirmus	Fr. infirme OFr. enfer, OOcc. eferm, Sp. enfermo, Pt. enfermo, It. infermo	malabitus	Fr. malade, Occ. malaut, Cat. malalt, It. malato, Srd. malaidu	Contraction of LL male habitus 'in poor shape'.
skin	cutis		pellis	Fr. peau, Occ. pèl, Cat. pell, Sp. piel, Pt. pele, It. pelle, Ro. piele	Meant 'animal hide' in CL.
speak	loqui	—	fabulare	OOcc. faular, Vgl. favlur, OIt. favolare, Sp. hablar, Pt. falar	Regularization of the rare CL fabulari 'chat', originally 'tell stories', a verb based on fabula.
speak	loqui	—	fabellare	Frl. fevelâ, OIt. favellare, Srd. faeddare	Verb based on CL fabella, the diminutive of fabula.
speak	loqui	—	parabolare	Fr. parler, Occ. parlar, Cat. parlar, It. parlare	Verb based on CL parabola 'parable', a borrowing of Greek παραβολή.
stone	saxum	Pt. seixo, (Note: With the specialized sense of 'pebble'.) It. sasso	petra	Fr. pierre, Occ. pèira, Cat. pedra, Sp. piedra, Pt. pedra, It. pietra, Ro. piatră	Late borrowing of Greek πέτρα.
Sunday	dies solis	—	dies dominicus	Fr. dimanche, Occ. dimenge, Cat. diumenge, Sp. domingo, Srd. dominigu	Lit. 'day of the Lord'. Dies 'day' could be either masculine or feminine in Latin.
Sunday	dies solis	—	dies dominica	Vgl. domienca, It. domenica, Ro. duminică	Lit. 'day of the Lord'. Dies 'day' could be either masculine or feminine in Latin.
swift	celer		rapidus	OFr. rade, OSp. raudo, OIt. ratto, Ro. repede	Meant 'hasty' in CL.
sword	gladius	OFr. glai, (Note: With the transferred sense of 'sword-lily'.) OOcc. glazi, OIt. ghiado	spatha	Fr. épée, Occ. espasa, Cat. espasa, Sp. espada, Pt. espada, It. spada, Ro. spată	Borrowing of Greek σπάθη. A long cavalry sword, which superseded gladius in the 3rd C.
teach	docere	OFr. duire	insignare	Fr. enseigner, Occ. ensenhar, Cat. ensenyar, Sp. enseñar, Pt. ensinar, It. insegnare	Prefixed version of CL signare 'note, indicate'.
thick	densus	Ro. des, Vgl. dais	grossus	Fr. gros, Occ. gròs, Cat. gros, Sp. grueso, Pt. grosso, It. grosso, Ro. gros	Of obscure origin.
thick	densus	Ro. des, Vgl. dais	spissus	Fr. épais, Occ. espés, Cat. espès, Sp. espeso, Pt. espesso, It. spesso	Generally meant 'slow', 'difficult', etc. in CL.
think	cogitare	OFr. cuidier, Occ. cuidar, Cat. cuidar, Sp. cuidar, Pt. cuidar, (Note: With the transferred sense of 'care (for)' and 'pay attention', cf. the Spanish and Catalan cognates.) OIt. coitare, Ro. cugetare	pensare	Fr. penser, Occ. pensar, Cat. pensar, Sp. pensar, Pt. pensar, It. pensare, Ro. păsare (Note: With the transferred sense of 'care'.)	Generally meant 'weigh' in CL, along with the extended sense of 'consider'.
tomorrow	cras	OSp. cras, OPt. cras, OIt. crai, Sic. crai, Srd. cras	mane	Ro. mâine	Meant 'in the morning' in CL.
tomorrow	cras	OSp. cras, OPt. cras, OIt. crai, Sic. crai, Srd. cras	de mane	Fr. demain, Occ. deman, Cat. demà, Rms. damaun, It. domani	LL expression meaning 'early in the morning'.
touch	tangere	OCat. tànyer, Sp. tañer, (Note: Had the sense of 'touch' in medieval times but has since come to mean 'play (an instrument)', cf. the Portuguese cognate.) Pt. tanger	toccare	Fr. toucher, Occ. tocar, Cat. tocar, Sp. tocar, Pt. tocar, It. toccare, Ro. tocare	Borrowed from Germanic, with the original sense of 'hit, strike'.
understand	intellegere	Rms. encleger, Ro. înțelegere	intendere	Fr. entendre, Occ. entendre, Cat. entendre, Sp. entender, Pt. entender, It. intendere	Had various senses in CL, most relevantly 'direct one's attention (towards)'.
week	hebdomas	OFr. domée, Ct. doma, Rms. jamna, Vgl. jedma, OIt. edima and domada.	septimana	Fr. semaine, Occ. setmana, Cat. setmana, Sp. semana, Pt. semana, Vgl. setimuon, It. settimana, Ro. săptămână	Attested in LL, from CL septem 'seven', referring to the number of days in a week.
wide	latus	Fr. lé, Ro. lat	largus	Fr. large, Occ. larg, Cat. llarg, OSp. largo, (Note: Modern Spanish largo has come to mean 'long' and has completed ousted the original luengo (=Lat. longus) from that role.) Pt. largo, It. largo, Ro. larg	Meant 'abundant' in CL.
word	verbum	Fr. verve, (Note: With the transferred sense of 'eloquence'.) OSp. vierbo, Ast. vierbu, Ro. vorbă (Note: Etymology remains disputed.)	parabola	Fr. parole, Occ. paraula, Cat. paraula, Sp. palabra, Pt. palavra, It. parola, Srd. paragula	Meant 'parable' in CL, a borrowing of Greek παραβολή.
work	laborare	Occ. laurar, Cat. llaurar, Sp. labrar, (Note: With the specialized sense of 'plough', cf. the Catalan, Occitan, and Portuguese cognates.) Pt. lavrar, Rms. luvrar, It. lavorare	tripaliare	Fr. travailler, Occ. trabalhar, Cat. treballar, Sp. trabajar, Pt. trabalhar, Srd. triballare	Verb based on LL tripalium, a sort of torture device made of three stakes.

== See also ==
- Appendix Probi
- Reichenau Glossary
- Proto-Romance language
- Phonological changes from Classical Latin to Proto-Romance

== General sources ==
- Dworkin, Steven Norman. 2016. Lexical stability and shared lexicon. In Ledgeway, Adam & Maiden, Martin (eds.), The Oxford guide to the Romance languages, 577–587. Oxford University Press.
- Elcock, William Dennis. 1975. The Romance languages. London: Faber and Faber.
- Herman, József. 2000. Vulgar Latin. University Park: Pennsylvania State University Press. Translated by Wright, Roger.
- Lewis, Charlton; Short, Charles. 1879. A Latin Dictionary. Oxford: Clarendon Press.
- Löfstedt, Einar. 1959. Late Latin. Oslo: H. Aschehoug & Co. Translated by Willis, James.
- Meyer-Lübke, Wilhelm. 1911. Romanisches etymologisches Wörterbuch. Heidelberg: C. Winter.
