= Reichenau Glossary =

Collection of Latin glosses on the Vulgate Bible

The Reichenau Glossary is a collection of Latin glosses likely compiled in the 8th century in northern France to assist local clergy in understanding certain words or expressions found in the Vulgate Bible. They constitute an important document in Romance linguistics, particularly Gallo-Romance.

== Background ==
Over the centuries Jerome’s translation of the Bible (c. 382–405) became more difficult to read for novice clergy as a result of the various grammatical, lexical, and phonological changes that Latin was experiencing in the course of its evolution into Romance. To facilitate interpretation, scribes would put together glossaries or collected explanations of words or phrases found in the Vulgate. The words used as glosses tended to be those that were destined to survive in Romance, whilst the words that needed glossing generally were not. (Note: Nevertheless, the latter sometimes do survive in other branches of Romance- or even in French itself but with altered meanings.)

What is now known as the Reichenau Glossary was compiled circa the eighth century at the Abbey of Corbie in Picardy. From there it eventually found its way to the Abbey of Reichenau, in southern Germany, where it was found in 1863 by the philologist Adolf Hotzmann.

== Selected entries ==
Term found in Vulgate	Meaning	Descendants	Gloss(es)	Origin	Descendants (Note: Clearly borrowed words are not counted as descendants. This excludes, for instance, the Italian words formaggio 'cheese' and pallio 'cloak', which were taken from Old French and Latin respectively. List of abbreviations: PR. — Proto-Romance Pic. — Picard Wal. — Walloon Fr. — French (central) Lim. — Limousin Prv. — Provençal Gsc. — Gascon OOcc. — Old Occitan Occ. — Occitan (central) OCAat. — Old Catalan Cat. — Catalan (central) Rib. — Ribagorçan Ara. — Aragonese (northern) OSp. — Old Spanish Sp. — Spanish (central) Ast. — Asturian Glc. — Galician OPt. — Old Portuguese Pt. — Portuguese (central) Lig. — Ligurian Pie. — Piedmontese Lmb. — Lombard (Milanese) Rms. — Romansh Lad. — Ladin Vnz. — Venetian Frl. — Friulan Vgl. — Vegliote Tsc. — Tuscan OIt. — Old Italian It. — Italian Nap. — Neapolitan Sic. — Sicilian Srd. — Sardinian (Nuorese) Ro. — Romanian ARo. — Aromanian IRo. — Istro-Romanian)
abdito	hidden.DAT/ABL	—	absconso	Attested variant of CL abscondito 'hidden', a cognate of abdito. (Note: With the additional prefix con-. Note that abs- is simply a variant of ab-.)	PR. */asˈko^{n}su/ OFr. escons OOcc. escos Cat. escòs OSp. escuso OPt. escuso Vnz. sconto (Note: Conceivably a direct descendant of the original CL participle absconditus.); It. ascoso Ro. ascuns
abio (Note: Read: abeo.)	go_away.1SG	—	uado	Vado meant 'hurry, rush' in CL.	PR. */ˈβao/ OFr. vois (Note: The [i̯s] ending is of uncertain origin. It may have been taken from *trasjo < Classical Latin transeo 'I cross' (Pope 1934: 362). The resulting *vau̯sjo would then yield vois by regular developments.); Fr. vais Cat. vaig Occ. vau Sp. voy (Note: Old Spanish had the expected form [βo]. The origin of the later [i̯] is debated. It may either reflect OSp. y 'there' or be the result of contamination from the following pronoun in the phrase vo-yo 'I go' (Lloyd 1987: 355–358).); Ast. vo Pt. vou Vnz. vago Vgl. vis It. vado Nap. vaco
abgetarii (Note: Read: abietarii.)	woodworkers	—	carpentarii	CL for 'wagon makers'.	PR. */karpenˈtarʲi/^{nom} OFr. charpentier
abgetarii	woodworkers	—	carpentarii	CL for 'wagon makers'.	PR. */karpenˈtarʲos/^{acc} Fr. charpentiers Occ. carpentièrs Sp. carpinteros Pt. carpinteiros
absintio (Note: Read: absinthio.)	wormwood.DAT/ABL	PR. */apˈsɪntʲo/ OFr. assenz OOcc. aussen Sp. ajenjo, asenjo Ast. axenxu Vgl. ascianz OIt. assenzo	aloxino	Greek ἀλόη όξίνης 'bitter aloe'.	PR. */aˈlɔksɪna/ Fr. aluine OSp. alosna Pt. alosna
adolescentia	youth	—	iuuentus	CL synonym.	PR. */jʊˈβɛntu/ OFr. jovent Occ. jovent Cat. jovent
aculeus	stinger	—	aculeonis	Derivative based on CL aculeus + -o, -onis, originally a noun-forming suffix but serving here merely as an extender. Note the Gallo-Romance analogical nominative in place of the expected *aculeo.	PR. */akuˈlʲone/ Fr. aiguillon Occ. agulhon Sp. aguijón Ast. guiyón Glc. aguillón
aes	bronze	—	eramen (Note: Read: aeramen.)	Derivative based on aer- (obl. stem of aes) + -men, originally a noun-forming suffix but serving here merely as an extender. Attested in the fourth-century Codex Theodosianus.	PR. */aˈramen/ Fr. airain Occ. aram Cat. aram Ast. arame Pt. arame Rms. arom It. rame Ro. aramă Srd. ràmene
aes	bronze	—	eramen	Derivative based on aer- (obl. stem of aes) + -men, originally a noun-forming suffix but serving here merely as an extender. Attested in the fourth-century Codex Theodosianus.	PR. */aˈramɪne/ Sp. alambre
ager	field	PR. */ˈaɡru/ Occ. agre Pie. aire It. agro Ro. agru 'field, land'	campus	Already a near-synonym in CL.	PR. */ˈkampʊs/^{nom} OFr. chans
ager	field	PR. */ˈaɡru/ Occ. agre Pie. aire It. agro Ro. agru 'field, land'	campus	Already a near-synonym in CL.	PR. */ˈkampu/^{acc} Fr. champ Occ. camp Cat. camp Sp. campo Ast. campu Pt. campo Rms. champ Vgl. cuomp It. campo Nap. campo Srd. campo Ro. câmp
annuant	nod.3PL.SBJV	—	cinnant	Verb based on LL cinnus 'wink', a word of obscure origin.	PR. */ˈkɪnnant/ OFr. cenent OOcc. cenan Pt. acenam^{+pref} It. accennano^{+pref}
anxiaretur	worry.3SG..PASS.SBJV	OIt. ansia Sp. ansia Pt. ansia 'eagerly await'	angustiaretur	LL verb based on CL angustia 'tribulations, difficulties'.	PR. */anˈɡʊstʲat/ Fr. angoisse Occ. angoissa Cat. angoixa It. angoscia
aper	boar	PR. */ˈapru/ Srd. porcapru (Note: Compounded with /ˈpɔɾku/ 'pig'.)	saluaticus porcus (Note: Read: siluaticus porcus.)	Periphrase, lit. 'wild pig'.	PR. */ˈpɔrkʊs salˈβatɪkʊs/^{nom} OFr. pors salvadges
aper	boar	PR. */ˈapru/ Srd. porcapru	saluaticus porcus	Periphrase, lit. 'wild pig'.	PR. */ˈpɔrku salˈβatɪku/^{acc} Fr. porc sauvage Occ. pòrc salvatge Cat. porc salvatge Rms. portg selvadi Vgl. puarc salvutic It. porco salvatico Ro. porc sălbatic
arbusta	orchards	—	arbricellus	Rendering of *arboriscellus, a postclassical compound based on CL arbor, arboris 'tree' + -cellus, a conflation of CL -culus and -ellus, both diminutive-forming suffixes.	PR. */arborɪsˈkɛllu/ Fr. arbrisseau Occ. arbrissèl 'shrubbery' It. arboscello 'sapling'
area	threshing-floor	PR. */ˈarʲa/ Fr. aire Occ. ièra Cat. era Sp. Ast. era Pt. eira It. aia Ro. arie	danea	Frankish *dannja.	Wal. dègne
arena	sand	PR. */aˈrena/ OFr. areine Occ. arena Cat. arena Sp. arena Ast. areña Pt. areia It. rena Nap. rena Srd. rena ORo. arină ARo. arinã	sabulo	CL for 'gravel'.	PR. */saˈblone/ Fr. sablon Occ. sablon Cat. sauló Sp. sablón Rms. sablun Vgl. salbaun It. sabbione IRo. salbun
armilla	bracelet	PR. */arˈmɪlla/ Sp. armella	baucus	Ultimately from Proto-Germanic *baugaz.	OFr. bou
atram	black.F.ACC.SG	—	nigram	Nearly synonymous with atram in CL and replaced the latter in LL.	PR. */ˈnɪɡra/ Fr. noire Gsc. nera Occ. negra Cat. negra Sp. negra Pt. negra Pie. neira Rms. naire Vgl. niara It. nera Nap. neura Ro. neagră
axis	axle	PR. */ˈakse/ Fr. ais 'plank' Occ. ais Cat. eix Sp. eje Ast. exa Pt. eixo It. asse 'beam, axle'	ascialis	An attempt to render *axialis, a postclassical compound based on CL axis 'axle' + -alis, originally an adjective-forming suffix.	PR. */akˈsale/ OFr. aissel
axis	axle	PR. */ˈakse/ Fr. ais 'plank' Occ. ais Cat. eix Sp. eje Ast. exa Pt. eixo It. asse 'beam, axle'	ascialis	An attempt to render *axialis, a postclassical compound based on CL axis 'axle' + -alis, originally an adjective-forming suffix.	PR. */akˈsile/ Fr. essieu
benignitate	kindness.ABL	—	bonitate	Often had this sense in CL.	PR. */bonɪˈtate/ Fr. bonté Occ. bontat Cat. bontat Sp. bondad Pt. bondade OIt. bontade It. bontà Ro. bunătate
binas	in_pairs.F.PL.ADJ	—	duas et duas	Periphrase, literally 'two and two'.	Fr. deux à deux Sp. de dos en dos Pt. de dois em dois It. due a due
calamus	reed-pen	PR. */ˈkalamu/ Fr. chaume 'stubble, thatch' Fr. calame 'reed-pen'	penna	CL for 'feather', reflecting a change in the usual writing implement by late antiquity.	PR. */ˈpɪnna/ OFr. pene Pt. pena It. penna Sic. pinna Ro. peană
callidior	devious.COMP	—	uitiosior	Comparative form of CL uitiosus 'wicked, corrupt'.	PR. */βɪˈtʲosu/ OFr. voisos Occ. viciós Cat. viciós 'depraved' It. vezzoso 'charming'
calumpniam (Note: Read: calumniam.)	slander.ACC	PR. */kaˈlʊmnʲa/ OFr. chalonge OOcc. calonja OSp. caloña OPt. coima	contentio	CL for 'quarrel, dispute'.	PR. */tenˈtʲone/^{-pref} OOcc. tensón
calx	heel	PR. */'kalke/ OPt. couce Glc. couce Pt. coice OSp. coçe Sp. coz 'kick'	calcaneum	Compound based on calx + -aneus, originally an adjective-forming suffix but now serving merely as an extender.	PR. */kalˈkanʲu/ OFr. calcain Gsc. caucanh Cat. calcani OSp. calanno Ast. calcañu Rms. chalchagn It. calcagno Srd. carcanzu ARo. cãlcãnju Ro. călcâi
caminum	furnace.ACC	PR. */kaˈminu/ Rms. chamin Vgl. camain It. camino	clibanum	A late borrowing of Greek κλίβανος. Did not survive in Romance.	—
cartallo	basket.DAT/ABL	—	panario	CL for 'breadbasket'.	PR. */paˈnarʲu/ Fr. panier Occ. panièr Sp. panero Pt. paneiro OIt. panaio Nap. panaro
caseum	cheese.ACC	PR. */ˈkasʲu/ Sp. queso Pt. queijo Vgl. chis Tsc. cascio Nap. caso Srd. casu Ro. caș	formaticum	Compound based on CL forma 'mould' + -aticus, a derivational suffix that became especially popular in Gallo-Romance. The original sense here appears to have been 'that which is made in a mould'.	Fr. fromage Occ. formatge Cat. formatge
caseum	cheese.ACC	PR. */kaˈsʲɔlu/^{dim} Rms. chaschöl	formaticum	Compound based on CL forma 'mould' + -aticus, a derivational suffix that became especially popular in Gallo-Romance. The original sense here appears to have been 'that which is made in a mould'.	Fr. fromage Occ. formatge Cat. formatge
crastro (Note: Read: castro.)	barracks.DAT/ABL	PR. */ˈkastru/ Sp. castro Pt. castro	heribergo	Frankish *heriberga.	OFr. herberge Occ. albèrgo
cementarii (Note: Read: caementarii.)	stonecutters	Fr. cimentiers	mationes	Frankish *makjo. Note the free interchange, before a following vowel, of ⟨ti⟩ and ⟨ci⟩, both representing [ts].	Fr. maçons Occ. maçons
cementariis (Note: Read: caementariis.)	stonecutters.DAT/ABL	Fr. cimentiers	macionibus	Frankish *makjo. Note the free interchange, before a following vowel, of ⟨ti⟩ and ⟨ci⟩, both representing [ts].	Fr. maçons Occ. maçons
cenacula	chambers	—	mansiunculas	LL diminutive of CL mansio 'lodging'.	PR. */maˈsʲones/^{-dim} Fr. maisons Occ. maisons Sp. mesones OPt. meijãoes Vgl. mošune 'barns' It. magioni 'houses' Srd. masones 'herds'
cesis (Note: Read: caesis.)	beaten.DAT/ABL.PL	—	flagellatis	CL for 'whipped'.	PR. */flaɡelˈlatos/ OFr. flaelez Fr. flaggelés
cibaria	food	Ast. cebera 'produce, cereal'	cibus uiuendi	A phrase reminiscent of Proto-Romance *uiuanda 'food', an alteration of CL uiuenda 'that which is necessary for life'.	PR. */βiˈβanda/ Fr. viande 'meat' Occ. vianda Ast. vianda 'meal' It. vivanda 'food'
cibaria	food	Ast. cebera 'produce, cereal'	cibus uiuendi	A phrase reminiscent of Proto-Romance *uiuanda 'food', an alteration of CL uiuenda 'that which is necessary for life'.	PR. */βiˈβɛnda/ Sp. vivienda Pt. vivenda 'residence, housing'
clibanus	oven	—	furnus	The more usual CL word.	PR. */ˈfʊrnu/^{acc} Fr. four Occ. forn Cat. forn Ara. furno Sp. horno Ast. fornu Pt. forno Rms. furn It. forno Nap. fuorno Srd. furru ARo. furnu
cliuium (Note: Read: cliuum.)	hill.ACC	—	montania	Rendering of *montanea, a postclassical compound based on CL mont- (obl. stem of mons 'mountain') + -anea, originally an adjective-forming suffix but now serving merely as an extender.	PR. */monˈtanʲa/ Fr. montagne Occ. montanha Cat. muntanya Sp. montaña Pt. montanha Rms. muntogna It. montagna Nap. muntagna
coccinus	scarlet	—	rubeus	CL for 'red'.	PR. */ˈrʊβʲʊs/^{nom} OFr. roges
coccinus	scarlet	—	rubeus	CL for 'red'.	PR. */ˈrʊβʲu/^{acc} Fr. rouge Gsc. arrui Occ. roge Cat. roig Ara. roio Sp. rubio Ast. roxu Pt. ruivo Pie. rubi It. robbio Srd. rubiu Ro. roib
colliridam (Note: Read: collyridam.)	pastry.ACC	—	turtam	Already attested in the first-century Vindolanda tablets. Presumably from torta 'twisted', in reference to the shape of the pastry.	PR. */ˈtʊrta/ Fr. tourte Occ. torta Sp. torta Rms. turta Vgl. turta It. torta Srd. turta Ro. turtă
commutatione	exchange.ABL	—	concambiis	Late borrowing of Gaulish *cambion. The glosser has added the prefix con- by analogy with commutatione.	PR. */ˈkambʲu/^{-pref} Fr. change Occ. cambi Cat. canvi Sp. cambio Pt. cambio It. cambio Ro. schimb (Note: /s/ is a remnant of the Latin prefix ex- (Dexonline: "schimb").)
compellit	urge.3SG	—	anetset	Frankish *anhattian.	OFr. anecet OIt. anizza OPt. anaça
concidit	cut.3SG.PRT	—	taliauit	Verb based on CL talea 'cutting from a plant'.	PR. */taˈlʲa^{u}t/ Fr. tailla Cat. tallà Sp. tajó Pt. talhou It. tagliò Ro. tăie
contumeliam	belittlement.ACC	—	uerecundiam	CL for 'shame, disgrace'.	PR. */βerˈɡʊnʲa/ Fr. vergogne Occ. vergonha Cat. vergonya OSp. verguenna Ast. vergoña Pt. vergonha It. vergogna Nap. vregogna
contumeliam	belittlement.ACC	—	uerecundiam	CL for 'shame, disgrace'.	PR. */βerˈɡʊndʲa/ Occ. vergunja Sp. vergüenza OPt. vergonça Lmb. vargonja Srd. brigunza
coturnices	quail.PL	PR. */kotʊrˈnikes/ Sp. codornizes Pt. codornizes OIt. cotornici	quacoles	Onomatopoeic.	PR. */ˈkʷakkolas/ Fr. cailles Occ. calhas Cat. guatles Rib. guallas Rms. quacras It. quaglie
coturnices	quail.PL	PR. */kotʊrˈniklas/^{dim} Ro. potârnichi (Note: Initial consonant probably taken from Latin perdix, 'partridge' (Dexonline: "potârniche").) 'partridges'	quacoles	Onomatopoeic.	PR. */ˈkʷakkolas/ Fr. cailles Occ. calhas Cat. guatles Rib. guallas Rms. quacras It. quaglie
scabrones (Note: Read: crabrones.)	hornets	PR. */karaˈbrones/ Pt. cambrãos It. calabroni	uuapces	Frankish *wapsa.	Fr. guêpes
crebro (Note: Read: cribro.)	sieve.ABL	—	criuolo	The same word after liquid dissimilation. The extra ⟨o⟩ appears to be a hypercorrection.	PR. */ˈkriβru/ Fr. crible Ara. griba^{fem}Sp. cribo Pt. crivo Pie. cribi Lmb. cribi Srd. chilibru Ro. ciur
crebro	sieve.ABL	—	criuolo	The same word after liquid dissimilation. The extra ⟨o⟩ appears to be a hypercorrection.	PR. */kriˈβɛllu/^{dim} Gsc. crièth Occ. crivèl Cat. garbell It. crivello
crura	shins	—	tibia	Had this sense in CL as well.	PR. */ˈtiβʲa/ Fr. tige 'stem'
culmen	peak	PR. */ˈkʊlmen/ It. colmo Ast. cume, cuelmu Pt. cume Ro. culme	spicus	Attested Classical variant of spica 'point' or 'ear of grain'.	PR. */sˈpiku/^{acc} Fr. épi Occ. espic Frl. spi Ro. spic
culmen	peak	PR. */ˈkʊlmɪne/ Sp. cumbre	spicus	Attested Classical variant of spica 'point' or 'ear of grain'.	PR. */sˈpika/^{fem} Occ. espiga Cat. espiga Sp. espiga Pt. espiga Vgl. spaica It. spiga Srd. ispica
cuncti	all.PL	—	omnes	CL synonym.	PR. */ˈɔmnes/ OIt. onni
da	give.IMP.SG	PR. */ˈda/ Gsc. da Ara. da Sp. da Pt. dá Rms. dai Vgl. du It. dà Srd. da Ro. dă	dona	CL synonym and cognate that became more popular in Gallo-Romance.	PR. */ˈdona/ Fr. donne Occ. dona Cat. dona Ara. dona
denudare	lay_bare.INF	PR. */dɪsnuˈdare/ Fr. dénuer 'deprive' Sp. desnudar Ast. esnudar Pt. desnudar 'undress'	discooperire	Compound based on CL dis- (a negating prefix) + cooperire 'cover up'.	PR. */dɪskopeˈrire/ Fr. découvrir Occ. descobrir Cat. descobrir Sp. descubrir Pt. descobrir Pie. descörve It. discoprire Ro. descoperire
detestare	revile.INF	—	blasphemare	A late borrowing of Greek βλασφημέειν 'id.'	PR. */blasteˈmare/ Fr. blâmer Occ. blaimar Cat. blasmar Sp. lastimar Pt. lastimar Vgl. blasmur OIt. biastemmiare (Note: A verb based on the noun biastemmia, from Latin blasphemia. The modern form of the verb, bestemmiare, was possibly influenced by bestia 'animal' (Treccani: "bestemmiare").); Srd. brastimar Ro. blestemare
dilecta	love.F.PASS.PTCP	—	amata	CL synonym in this context.	PR. */aˈmata/ OFr. amede Fr. aimée (Note: Towards the thirteen century, the initial vowel of this verb could be either [a] or [ɛ] depending on stress. Consider the following examples: Pr. /ˈamat/ 'he loves' > OFr. /ˈai̯məθ/ > /ˈɛmə/ Pr. /aˈmata/ 'beloved' > OFr. /aˈme:ðə/ > /aˈmeə/ Subsequently /ɛ/ spread to all conjugations, resulting in modern French /ɛme/ 'beloved' instead of */ame/ (Akire & Rosen 2010: 115).); Occ. aimada Cat. amada Ara. amata Sp. amada Pt. amada Vnz. amà It. amata Srd. amada
ducta	lead.F.PASS.PTCP	PR. */ˈdʊkta/ OFr. duite OOcc. ducha Cat. duita OSp. ducha OIt. dotta (Ro. dusă)	menata (Note: Read: minata.)	Past participle of minare, a regularization of the CL deponent minari 'threaten', with the sense evolution apparently in reference to yelling at livestock to make them move along.	PR. */mɪˈnata/ OFr. menede Fr. menée Occ. menada Cat. menada Ara. menata It. menata Ro. mânată
emit	buy.3SG.PRT	—	comparauit	Meant 'obtain' in CL.	PR. */kompaˈra^{u}t/ OFr. comprat Gsc. crompá Cat. comprà Sp. compró Pt. comprou It. comprò Ro. cumpără 'bought'
ensis	sword	—	gladius	More usual CL synonym.	PR. */ˈɡlajʊs~ˈɡladʊs/^{nom} OFr. glais 'sword-lily' (Note: It did, however, mean 'sword' in Old Franco-Provençal (TLFi: "glaive").)
ensis	sword	—	gladius	More usual CL synonym.	PR. */ˈɡlaju~ˈɡladu/^{acc} Fr. glai 'sword-lily' OOcc. glazi It. ghiado 'sword'
escas	food.ACC.PL	PR. */ˈɛskas/ Fr. esches Occ. escas Cat. esques Sp. yescas Ast. esques, ezques Pt. escas 'bait' It. esche 'bait, tinder' Ro. iești 'tinder'	cibos	CL synonym.	PR. */ˈkɪβos/ Sp. cebos Pt. cevos 'bait'
exacerbauerunt	irritate.3PL.PRT	—	exasperauerunt	CL synonym. The unprefixed version apparently survived in Proto-Romance as asprire, with a change in conjugation.	PR. */asˈprirʊnt/^{-pref} OFr. asprirent OIt. asprirono
exaurire	drain.INF	—	scauare	CL excauare 'hollow out, empty', from ex- + cauare, a verb based on cauus 'hollow, empty'.	PR. */skaˈβare/ OFr. eschaver Occ. escavar Sp. escavar Pt. escavar Rms. stgavar It. scavare
exterminabit	uproot.3SG.FUT	—	eradicabit	CL synonym.	PR. */eradiˈkare/ Fr. arracher Gsc. arrigar OOcc. arazigar Ast. arriar Glc. arrigar Ro. ridicare
exuerunt	strip_away.3PL.PRT	—	expoliauerunt	CL synonym.	PR. */spoˈlʲarʊnt/ OFr. espoillierent It. spogliarono OSp. espojaron (Note: Modern despojaron via substitution of the prefix.); Glc. esbollaron
faretra (Note: Read: pharetra.)	arrow-case	—	teca sagittarum	Periphrase, lit. 'container for arrows'. Theca was a Classical borrowing of Greek θήκη 'container', while sagitta was the native Latin term for 'arrow'.	PR. */ˈteka/ Fr. taie 'pillowcase' It. tega 'pod' Ro. teacă 'case, sheath'
faretra	arrow-case	—	teca sagittarum	Periphrase, lit. 'container for arrows'. Theca was a Classical borrowing of Greek θήκη 'container', while sagitta was the native Latin term for 'arrow'.	PR. */saˈɡɪttas/ OFr. saietes Occ. sagetas Cat. sagetes Sp. saetas Pt. setas OIt. saette Srd. saittas Ro. săgeți
faretra	arrow-case	—	cupra	Frankish loan, cf. German Köcher.	OFr. cuivre
fatigatus	tired	—	lassus	CL synonym.	PR. */ˈlassʊs/ Fr. las Occ. las
femur	thigh	—	coxa	CL for 'hip'.	PR. */ˈkɔksa/ Fr. cuisse Occ. cuèissa Cat. cuixa Sp. cuja Pt. cuxa Pie. cheussa Rms. cossa Vgl. copsa It. coscia Srd. cossa Ro. coapsă
femur	thigh	—	cingolo (Note: Read: cingulum.)	Meant 'belt' in CL.	PR. */ˈkɪnɡla/ OFr. cengle Fr. sangle Occ. cengla Cat. cengle Pt. cilha Vnz. senghia It. cinghia
femur	thigh	—	cingolo	Meant 'belt' in CL.	PR. */ˈklɪnɡa/ Nap. chienga Ro. chingă
ferus	savage	PR. */ˈfɛrʊs/^{nom} OFr. fiers 'proud'	durus	CL for 'harsh, severe'.	PR. */ˈdurʊs/^{nom} OFr. durs Rms. dirs (Note: In the Sursilvan dialect, masculine singular -s survives as a predicative ending in adjectives. E.g. il paun ei cars 'the bread is expensive' (Loporcaro 2018: 76–77).)
ferus	savage	PR. */ˈfɛru/^{acc} Fr. fier 'proud' Cat. fer 'ugly' It. fiero 'proud' Sp. fiero 'wild'	durus	CL for 'harsh, severe'.	PR. */ˈduru/^{acc} Fr. dur Occ. dur Cat. dur Sp. duro Pt. duro Lmb. dur Rms. dir Vgl. doir It. duro
feruet	boil.3SG	PR. */ˈfɛrβet/ Sp. hierve Pt. ferve Ro. fierbe 'id.' It. ferve 'has a fever'	bullit	CL synonym.	PR. */ˈbʊllɪt/ OFr. bolt Fr. bout Occ. bolhe Cat. bulle Sp. bulle 'id.' Pt. bule 'fidgets' It. bole Nap. vodde Srd. buddit 'id.'
fex	dregs	—	lias	Gaulish *ligas.	Fr. lies
flare	blow.INF	—	suflare (Note: Read: sufflare.)	CL synonym.	PR. */sʊfˈflare/ Fr. souffler Occ. soflar Ara. soflar OSp. sollar Ast. asollar Pt. soprar Rms. suflar It. soffiare Ro. suflare
flasconem	flask.ACC	OFr. flascon Fr. flacon Occ. flascon Cat. flascó Sp. frasco Pt. frasco It. fiasco	buticulam	Diminutive of butis~buttis 'cask', a late borrowing of Greek βοῦττις.	PR. */bʊtˈtɪkla/ Fr. bouteille Occ. botelha
fletur	weep.3SG.PASS	—	planctur (Note: Read: plangitur.)	CL for 'there is mourning'.	PR. */ˈplanɡere/^{inf} Fr. plaindre Occ. planher Cat. plànyer OSp. llanner OPt. changer Vnz. piànzar Vgl. plungro It. piangere Nap. chiagne Sic. chiànciri Srd. prangere Ro. plângere
forum	marketplace	PR. */ˈfɔru/ OFr. fuer Fr. fur 'extent' Sp. fuero 'law'	mercatum	CL synonym in this context.	PR. */merˈkatu/ OFr. marchiet Fr. marché Occ. mercat Cat. mercat Sp. mercado Pt. mercado Rms. marchà Vnz. marcà It. mercato Srd. mercadu
framea	type of sword	—	gladius bisacutus	Lit. 'double-edged sword'. Bisacutus is a compound based on CL bis 'twice' + acutus 'sharpened'. For descendants of gladius 'sword', see entry for ensis.	PR. */bɪsaˈkuta/ Fr. besaiguë 'carpenter's tool with two sides' It. bisacuta 'double-edged'
furent (Note: Read: furentur.)	steal.3PL.SBJV	PR. */ˈfurent/ It. furino Ro. fure	involent	CL for 'sweep down, carry off'.	PR. */ˈɪmβolent/ OFr. emblent OOcc. emblen OCat. emblen
furent	steal.3PL.SBJV	PR. */ˈfurent/ It. furino Ro. fure	involent	CL for 'sweep down, carry off'.	PR. */ɪmˈβolent/ It. involino
furuus	brown	—	brunus	Frankish *brūn.	Fr. brun Occ. brun Cat. bru Sp. bruno Pt. bruno Rms. brun Vgl. broin It. bruno
fusiles	melt.PASS.PCP.PL	—	fundutas	Postclassical past participle of fundere 'melt'.	PR. */fʊnˈdutas/ Fr. fondues Occ. fondudas OIt. fondute 'melted'
galea	helmet	—	helmus	Frankish *helm.	OFr. helme^{acc} Fr. heaume Sp. yelmo Pt. elmo It. elmo
genuit	give_birth.3SG.PRT	—	generauit	CL synonym.	PR. */ɡeneˈra^{u}t/ OFr. gendrat Fr. engendra^{+pref} Gsc. engendrá^{+pref} Cat. engendrà^{+pref} Sp. engendró^{+pref} Pt. gerou
gratia	thanks	—	merces	CL for 'goods, wages'.	PR. */merˈkede/ OFr. mercit Fr. merci Occ. mercé 'mercy, thanks' Sp. merced Pt. mercê 'mercy' OIt. mercé 'thanks' It. mercede 'mercy'
abenas (Note: Read: habenas.)	reins.ACC	—	retinacula iumentorum	Periphrase, lit. 'reins for pack animals'. CL retinacula 'reins' is reminiscent of Proto-Romance *retina 'id.', a deverbal of retinere 'hold back'.	PR. */ˈrɛtɪnas/ OFr. rednes~resnes Fr. rênes Occ. retnas Cat. regnes Sp. riendas Pt. rédeas It. redine (Note: In Modern Italian redine has been reinterpreted as a singular noun (albeit still feminine) with a new analogical plural redini (Treccani: "redine").)
abenas	reins.ACC	—	retinacula iumentorum	Periphrase, lit. 'reins for pack animals'. CL retinacula 'reins' is reminiscent of Proto-Romance *retina 'id.', a deverbal of retinere 'hold back'.	PR. */juˈmɛntu/ Fr. jument 'mare' OSp. iumiento Sp. jumento Ast. xumentu Pt. jumento It. giumento Nap. jummènta^{fem} 'pack animal'
arundine (Note: Read: harundine.)	reed.ABL	—	ros	Frankish *rausa.	OFr. ros Occ. raus
arundine	reed.ABL	—	ros	Frankish *rausa.	OFr. rosel^{dim}Fr. roseau
ebitatum (Note: Read: hebetatum.)	weaken.ACC.PASS.PTCP	—	bulcatum	Past participle of *bullicare, a compound based on CL bullire 'boil' + -icare, a verb-forming suffix.	PR. */bʊllɪˈkatu/ OFr. bolgiet Fr. bougé Occ. bolegat Cat. bellugat Ara. esbolligato^{+pref} 'stirred, agitated' It. bulicato 'boiled'
iacinctinas (Note: Read: hyacinthinas.)	hyacinth.F.PL.ACC.ADJ	PR. */jaˈkintu/ Fr. jacinthe^{fem} Occ. jacint Cat. jacint	persas	Ultimately from Persia, perhaps because garments imported from there had this color.	Fr. perse 'blue-green'
hiems	winter	—	ibernus	Nominalization of CL hibernus 'wintry', an adjective derived from hiems.	PR. */i^{m}ˈβɛrnʊs/^{nom}OFr. ivers OOcc. iverns
hiems	winter	—	ibernus	Nominalization of CL hibernus 'wintry', an adjective derived from hiems.	PR. */i^{m}ˈβɛrnu/^{acc}OFr. ivern Fr. iver Occ. ivèrn Cat. hivern Sp. invierno Ast. iviernu Pt. invernu Rms. inviern Vgl. inviarno It. inverno Srd. iberru Ro. iarnă^{fem}
horreis	granaries.DAT/ABL	PR. */ˈorrʲu/ Cat. orri Ast. horru Srd. orriu	spicariis	Compound based on CL spica 'ear of grain' + -arium 'place for keeping'.	PR. */spiˈkarʲu/ OWal. spir 'room for provisions' Grm. Speicher 'granary'
iacere	throw.INF	—	iactare	CL frequentative of iacere.	PR. */jekˈtare/ Fr. jeter Occ. getar Cat. gitar Ara. chitar Sp. echar It. gettare Nap. jettà Srd. ghettare ORo. (a)iepta WAst. axeitar OAst. gitar
ictus	strike	PR. */ˈɪktu/^{acc}Pt. eito 'row'	colpus	CL borrowing of Greek κόλαφος.	PR. */ˈkɔlpʊs/^{nom}OFr. cols
ictus	strike	PR. */ˈɪktu/^{acc}Pt. eito 'row'	colpus	CL borrowing of Greek κόλαφος.	PR. */ˈkɔlpu/^{acc}OFr. colp Fr. coup Occ. còp Cat. cop It. colpo
id	it.NEUT	—	hoc	CL for 'this'.	PR. */ˈɔk/ OFr. uec Occ. o Cat. ho 'this' Occ. òc OCat. oc 'yes'
iecore	liver.ABL	PR. */jeˈkʷarʲa/ (Note: A compound based on iecor + -aria, originally an adjective-forming suffix but here serving merely as an extender.); Pt. iguaria (Note: With an early change in suffix from -ia to -ía (Malkiel 1944: 108).) 'delicacies'	ficato	CL ficatum 'foie gras', lit. 'fig-fattened liver', calqued from Greek συκωτόν.	PR. */ˈfɪkatu/ Fr. foie Ast. fégadu It. fegato
iecore	liver.ABL	PR. */jeˈkʷarʲa/ Pt. iguaria 'delicacies'	ficato	CL ficatum 'foie gras', lit. 'fig-fattened liver', calqued from Greek συκωτόν.	PR. */fiˈkatu/ Frl. fiât Ro. ficat
iecore	liver.ABL	PR. */jeˈkʷarʲa/ Pt. iguaria 'delicacies'	ficato	CL ficatum 'foie gras', lit. 'fig-fattened liver', calqued from Greek συκωτόν.	PR. */ˈfikatu/ Sp. higado Pt. figato Rms. fio Nap. ficato Srd. ficadu Ast. fégadu
iecore	liver.ABL	PR. */jeˈkʷarʲa/ Pt. iguaria 'delicacies'	ficato	CL ficatum 'foie gras', lit. 'fig-fattened liver', calqued from Greek συκωτόν.	PR. */ˈfɪtaku/ Occ. fetge Cat. fetge Pie. fidic Lmb. fideg
indutus	dress.PASS.PTCP	—	uestitus	CL synonym.	PR. */βesˈtitu/^{acc}OFr. vestit Occ. vestit Cat. vestit Ara. vestito Sp. vestido Pt. vestido Vgl. vestiat It. vestito Srd. bestiu
indutus	dress.PASS.PTCP	—	uestitus	CL synonym.	PR. */βesˈtutu/^{acc}OFr. vestut Fr. vêtu OIt. vestuto
institis	bandages.ABL	—	fasciolis	CL synonym.	PR. */fasˈkʲɔlas/ OIt. fasciuole Ro. fâșioare
institis	bandages.ABL	—	nasculis	Frankish *nastila.	OFr. nasles Wal. nâles It. nastri^{masc}
insultaret	offend.3SG..SBJV	—	inganaret	Based on CL gannire 'snarl' with a prefix and a change in conjugation.	PR. */ɪnɡanˈnare/ OFr. enjaner Occ. enganar Cat. enganyar Sp. engañar It. ingannare Ro. îngânare
isset	go.3SG..SBJV	PR. */ˈisset/ Ara. isse Lad. jissa OIt. gisse Nap. jesse Ro. ise	ambulasset	CL for 'walk'.	PR. */amˈblasset/ OFr. alast Fr. alât Sp. amblase It. ambiasse Ro. umblase
ita	yes	—	sic	Already used in the sense of 'yes' in Old Latin.	PR. */ˈsik/ Fr. si Occ. si 'actually, yes' Cat. sí Sp. sí Pt. sim (Note: Nasalization possibly by contamination with não (=Lat. non), meaning 'no' (Williams 1962: 108).); Rms. schi It. sì 'yes' Ro. și 'and'
iuger	acre	—	iornalis	Rendering of *diurnalis, a postclassical compound based on CL diurnus 'daily' + -alis, an adjective-forming suffix. In France this term developed the sense of 'land that can be worked by oxen in a day'.	PR. */jʊrˈnale/ OFr. jornal 'journal, measure of land' Fr. journal (Note: Still refers to a measure of land in some dialects (TLFi: "journal").); Occ. jornal It. giornale 'journal'
iugulate	kill.IMP.PL	PR. */jʊˈɡlatɪs/ Ro. junghiați	occidite	CL synonym	See necetur.
ius	law	PR. */ˈjure/ OSp. jur OPt. jur It. giure	legem	CL near-synonym.	PR. */ˈleɡe/ OFr. lei Fr. loi Occ. lei Cat. llei Sp. ley Pt. lei Pie. lege Vgl. lig It. legge OSrd. leghe Ro. lege
ius	law	PR. */ˈjure/ OSp. jur OPt. jur It. giure	potestatem	CL for 'power, authority'.	PR. */potesˈtate/ OFr. podestet OOcc. pozestat OIt. podestade It. podestà
labium (Note: Read: labrum.)	tub	—	conca (Note: Read: concha.)	Could designate a sort of vessel in CL, but the main sense was 'shell'. Borrowed from Greek κόγχη.	PR. */ˈkɔnka/ Fr. conche Occ. conca Cat. conca Sp. cuenca Ast. conca It. conca 'basin, watershed' Srd. conca 'head'
lamento	wail.1SG	—	ploro	CL for 'weep'.	PR. */ˈploro/ OFr. plour Fr. pleure Occ. plori Cat. ploro Rib. plloro Ara. ploro Sp. lloro Ast. lloro Pt. choro Pie. piur OIt. pioro
laterum	bricks.GEN.PL	—	teularum (Note: Read: tegularum.)	CL for 'roof-tiles'.	PR. */ˈteɡʊlas/ OFr. tiules~teilles Fr. tuiles Occ. teulas Cat. teules Sp. tejas Ast. teya Pt. telhas Vgl. tacle It. tegole Srd. téulas 'tiles' Tsc. tegghie It. teglie 'baking-trays'
lebes	boiler	—	chaldaria (Note: Read: caldaria.)	LL compound based on CL calid- (obl. stem of calidus 'hot') + -aria, a noun-forming suffix.	PR. */kalˈdarʲa/ OFr. chaldiere Fr. chaudière Gsc. caudera Cat. caldera Sp. caldera Pt. caldeira Vgl. caldira It. caldaia Ro. căldare
leua (Note: Read: laeua.)	left.F.SG.ADJ	—	sinistra	CL synonym.	PR. */sɪˈnɛstra/ (Note: Alteration of the Latin [sɪnɪstra] by analogy with [dɛkstra] 'right' (Lausberg 1970: §139).); Fr. senestre Occ. senèstra OSp. siniestra OPt. sẽestra Rms. saniestra OIt. sinestra
liberos	children.ACC	—	infantes	CL for 'babies'.	PR. */ɪ^{n}ˈfantes/ Fr. enfants Occ. enfants Cat. infants 'id.' OSp. ifantes OPt. ifantes 'heirs-apparent' Rms. uffants 'id.' It. fanti 'infantry'
litus	shore	PR. */ˈlitu/ It. lido	ripa	CL synonym.	PR. */ˈripa/ Fr. rive Occ. riba Cat. riba Sp. riba Pt. riba Rms. riva Vgl. raipa It. riva Ro. râpă
ludebant	play.3PL.	—	iocabant	Regularization of the CL deponent verb iocari 'jest, joke'.	PR. */joˈkaβant/ OFr. joevent Fr. jouaient Occ. jogavan Cat. jugaven Ara. chugaban Sp. jugaban Pt. jogavam Rms. giogavan Vgl. jocua It. giocavano Ro. jucau
luto	mud.DAT/ABL	PR. */ˈlʊtu/ It. loto Sp. lodo Pt. lodo Ro. lut Srd. lutu	fecis (Note: Read: faecis.)	CL for 'dregs, sediment'.	PR. */ˈfɛkes/ It. feci Sp. heces Ast. fieces Pt. fezes
mala punica	pomegranates	—	mala granata	Periphrase, lit. 'seeded apples'.	PR. */mɪlaɡraˈnata/ Occ. milgrana Cat. magrana Ara. mengrana OSp. milgrana Sp. granada Pt. granada It. melagrana
malus	mast	—	mastus	Frankish *mast.	Fr. mât Occ. mast
manipulos	bundles.ACC	PR. */maˈnʊkli/^{nom}OFr. manoil OIt. manocchi Ro. mănuchi	garbas	Frankish *garba.	Fr. gerbes Occ. garbas Cat. garbes Ara. garbas Lig. garbe
manipulos	bundles.ACC	PR. */maˈnʊklos/^{acc}OFr. manoilz Cat. manolls Sp. manojos Ast. manoyos Pt. molhos	garbas	Frankish *garba.	Fr. gerbes Occ. garbas Cat. garbes Ara. garbas Lig. garbe
mares	male animals	—	masculi	CL diminutive of mas, the singular of mares.	PR. */ˈmask^{ʊ}li/^{nom}OFr. masle Vnz. mas-ci Frl. mascli It. maschi Ro. mascuri 'male pigs'
mares	male animals	—	masculi	CL diminutive of mas, the singular of mares.	PR. */ˈmask^{ʊ}los/^{acc}OFr. masles Fr. mâles Occ. mascles Cat. mascles Rib. mascllos Ara. masclos Sp. machos Pt. machos Rms. mascels Srd. mascros
mergulum	diver_bird.ACC	—	coruum marinum	Lit. 'sea-crow'.	PR. */ˈkɔrβu maˈrinu/ Fr. cormoran Occ. corb marin Cat. corb marí Sp. cuervo marino Pt. corvo marinho
milites	soldiers	—	seruientes	CL for 'servants'.	PR. */serˈβʲɛntes/ Fr. sergeants 'sergeants' Occ. sirvents Cat. servents Sp. sirvientes 'servants'
minas	threats.ACC	—	manaces	Feminine noun based on CL minacia 'menacing'.	PR. */mɪˈnakʲas/ Fr. menaces Gsc. miaças Occ. menaças OSp. menaças OPt. mẽaças It. minacce
mutuo acceperam	borrow.1SG.	—	impruntatum habeo	*Impruntare is a rendering of *impromutuare, a postclassical compound based on mutuare (a regularization of the CL deponent verb mutuari 'borrow') with the prefixes in- and pro-. The overall expression impruntatum habeo (lit. 'I have [it] borrowed) reflects the characteristic Romance periphrastic preterite.	PR. */ˈajo ɪmprum^{ʊ}ˈtatu/ OFr. ai empruntet Occ. ai empruntat Ro. am imprumutat
mutuum dare	lend.INF	—	prestare (Note: Read: praestare.)	CL for 'provide, furnish'.	PR. */presˈtare/ Fr. prêter Occ. prestar Cat. prestar Sp. prestar Ast. prestar 'to like' / emprestar 'to lend' Pt. prestar It. prestare
necetur	kill.3SG.PASS.SBJV	PR. */neˈkare/ OFr. neier Fr. noyer Occ. negar Sp. anegar^{+pref} It. annegare^{+pref} Ro. (î)necare ARo. necare	occidetur	CL synonym. In all of Romance the sense of necare specialized to 'kill by drowning', so this gloss serves to clarify the intended meaning 'kill'.	PR. */okˈkidere~au̯kˈkidere/ OFr. ocidre Occ. aucir It. uccidere Ro. ucidere Srd. occhidere
nemini	nobody.DAT	PR. */ˈnemɪni/ Ro. nimeni	nulli	CL synonym.	PR. */ˈnullu/^{acc} Fr. nul Occ. nul Cat. nul Vgl. nul It. nullo Srd. nuddu Sic. nuḍḍu 'none, futile'
nent	weave.3PL	—	filant	Verb based on CL filum 'thread'.	PR. */ˈfilant/ Fr. filent Gsc. hilan Occ. filan Cat. filen It. filano Sp. hilan Pt. filam
nonnulli	several	—	multi	CL synonym.	PR. */ˈmʊlti/^{nom}OFr. molt OOcc. much It. molti Ro. mulți
nonnulli	several	—	multi	CL synonym.	PR. */ˈmʊltos/^{acc} OFr. molz Cat. mols Sp. muchos Ast. munchos Pt. muitos (Note: Word-initial /m/ often nasalizes a following vowel in modern Portuguese (Williams 1962: 62).)
non pepercit	not spare.3SG.PRT	—	non sparniauit	Frankish *sparanjan.	OFr. nen esparnat It. non sparagnò
nouacula	razor	PR. */noˈβakla/ Cat. navalla Sp. navaja Ast. navaya Pt. navalha	rasorium	CL rad-, stem of radere 'shave'), + -sorium, a postclassical suffix denoting an instrument.	PR. */raˈsorʲu/ Fr. rasoir Occ. rasor Cat. raor Sp. rasero It. rasoio
nouerca	stepmother	PR. */noˈβɛrka/ ARo. nuearcã	matrastra	Compound based on CL matr- (oblique stem of mater 'mother') + -astra 'wannabe' (feminine variant of -aster).	PR. */maˈtrastra/ Fr. marâtre Occ. mairastra Cat. madrastra Sp. madrastra Pt. madrasta Pie. marastra Lmb. madrastra
nosse	know.INF	—	scire	CL near-synonym.	PR. */sˈkire/ Ro. știre Srd. ischire
nutare	wobble.INF	—	cancellare	CL for 'criss-cross'. The Romance sense developed from the notion of crossing one's legs while walking.	PR. */kankelˈlare/ Fr. chanceler
ocreas	greaves.ACC	—	husas	Frankish *hosa.	OFr. hueses OSp. uesas OPt. osas OIt. uose
offendas	drive_away.2SG.SBJV	—	abattas	Prefixed alteration of CL battuas.	PR. */abˈbattas/ Fr. abattes Occ. abatas Cat. abatis Sp. abatas Pt. abatas It. abbatta
onager	wild donkey	—	asinus saluaticus	Asinus is CL for 'donkey'. For saluaticus, see entry for aper.	PR. */ˈasɪnʊs/^{nom}OFr. asnes
onager	wild donkey	—	asinus saluaticus	Asinus is CL for 'donkey'. For saluaticus, see entry for aper.	PR. */ˈasɪnu/^{acc}OFr. asne Fr. âne Gsc. aso Occ. asne Cat. ase Sp. asno Pt. asno Lig. âze Pie. aso Lmb. asen Rms. asen Vnz. axeno It. asino Ro. asen Srd. áinu
onustus	burden.PASS.PTCP	—	carcatus	Past participle of *carricare, a verb based on CL carr- (obl. stem of carrus 'wagon') + icare, a verb-forming suffix.	PR. */karrɪˈkatʊs/^{nom}OFr. chargiez OOcc. cargats
onustus	burden.PASS.PTCP	—	carcatus	Past participle of *carricare, a verb based on CL carr- (obl. stem of carrus 'wagon') + icare, a verb-forming suffix.	PR. */karrɪˈkatu/^{acc}OFr. chargiet Fr. chargé Occ. cargat Cat. carregat Sp. cargado Pt. carregado It. caricato Ro. încărcat^{+pref}
oppidis	towns.DAT/ABL	—	ciuitatibus	LL for 'cities', a semantic alteration of CL ciuitas 'citizenry'.	PR. */kiβˈtates/ Fr. cités Occ. ciutats Cat. ciutats Sp. ciudades Ast. ciudaes Pt. cidades Rms. citads Vnz. sità OIt. cittadi It. città 'cities' Ro. cetăți 'fortresses'
oppidis	towns.DAT/ABL	—	castellis	CL for 'fortresses'.	PR. */kasˈtɛlli/^{nom}OFr. chastel OOcc. castel Vnz. castełi OIt. castegli It. castelli Sic. casteḍḍi
oppidis	towns.DAT/ABL	—	castellis	CL for 'fortresses'.	PR. */kasˈtɛllos/^{acc}OFr. chastels Fr. châteaux Gsc. castèths Occ. castèls Cat. castells Sp. castillos Ast. castiellos Pt. castelos Rms. chastès Srd. casteddos
opilio	shepherd	—	berbicarius	Compound based on CL ueruex 'ram' + -arius, a suffix denoting occupation.	PR. */berbɪˈkarʲʊs/^{nom}OFr. bergiers
opilio	shepherd	—	berbicarius	Compound based on CL ueruex 'ram' + -arius, a suffix denoting occupation.	PR. */berbɪˈkarʲu/^{acc}OFr. bergier Fr. berger Lim. bargier Ro. berbecar
opilio	shepherd	—	berbicarius	Compound based on CL ueruex 'ram' + -arius, a suffix denoting occupation.	PR. */berbeˈkarʲu/ Srd. berbecarju
oportet	be_fitting.3SG	—	conuenit	Had this sense in CL as well.	PR. */komˈβɛnɪt/ Fr. convient Occ. conven Cat. convé Sp. conviene Ast. convién Pt. convém It. conviene Ro. cuvine
optimos	best.ACC.PL	—	meliores	CL for 'better'. In Romance it also came to mean 'best'.	PR. */meˈlʲores/ Fr. meilleurs Occ. melhors Cat. millors Sp. mejores Ast. meyores Pt. melhores Rms. megliers It. migliori
optimum	best.ACC.SG	—	ualde bonum	Periphrase, lit. 'very good'. Valde survived as the first element of OFr. vaudoux and vaupute.	PR. */ˈbɔnu/ OFr. buen, bon Fr. bon Occ. bon Cat. bo Sp. bueno Ast. bon, bonu Pt. bom Rms. bun Vgl. bun It. buono Ro. bun
ore	mouth	—	bucca	CL for 'cheek'.	PR. */ˈbʊkka/ Fr. bouche Occ. boca Cat. boca Sp. boca Ast. boca Pt. boca Rms. boca Vgl. buca It. bocca 'mouth' Ro. bucă 'cheek'
ostendit	show.3SG.PRT	—	monstrauit	CL synonym.	PR. */mosˈtra^{u}t/ OFr. mostrat Fr. montra (Note: Nasalization came from an /n/ that was added in Middle French under the influence of CL monstrare (TLFi: "montrer").); Gsc. mostrà Cat. mostrà Sp. mostró Ast. amostró, amosó Pt. mostrou It. mostrò Ro. mustră
oues	sheep.PL	PR. */ˈɔβes/ Ro. oi	berbices	CL ueruex 'castrated ram'.	PR. */berˈbikes/ Fr. brebis OOcc. berbitz OIt. berbici
oues	sheep.PL	PR. */oˈβɪklas/^{dim}Fr. ouailles Occ. oelhas Lim. auvelhas Cat. ovelles Ara. uellas Sp. ovejas Ast. oveyes, ovees Pt. ovelhas	berbices	CL ueruex 'castrated ram'.	PR. */berˈbekes/ Srd. berbeches Ro. berbeci
paliurus	Christ's thorn	—	cardonis	A compound based on CL cardus 'thistle' + -o, -onis, originally a noun-forming suffix but serving here merely as an extender. Note the Gallo-Romance analogical nominative in place of the expected *cardo	PR. */karˈdone/^{acc}Fr. chardon Occ. cardon It. cardone Sic. carduni
paliurus	Christ's thorn	—	cardonis	A compound based on CL cardus 'thistle' + -o, -onis, originally a noun-forming suffix but serving here merely as an extender. Note the Gallo-Romance analogical nominative in place of the expected *cardo	PR. */ˈkardo/^{nom}Sp. cardo Pt. cardo It. cardo Sic. cardo
pallium	cloak	—	drappum	Frankish *drāpi.	Fr. drap Occ. drap Cat. drap Sp. trapo Pt. trapo Vgl. drap It. drappo Srd. drappu
papilionis	tent.GEN.SG	PR. */papɪˈlʲone/ OFr. paveilun 'butterfly, pavilion' Fr. pavillon Occ. pabalhon Ct. pavelló Sp. pabellón It. padiglione 'pavilion' Fr. papillon (Note: The substitution of /p/ for intervocalic /v/ may be a phonoaesthetic change inspired by onomatopoeia for the flapping of a butterfly's wings (TLFi: "papillon").); Occ. parpalhon Cat. papallona OIt. parpaglione 'butterfly'	trauis	Gallo-Romance analogical nominative in place of CL trabs 'beam' or 'structure built around a beam' (obl. stem trab-).	OFr. tres^{nom}
papilionis	tent.GEN.SG	PR. */papɪˈlʲone/ OFr. paveilun 'butterfly, pavilion' Fr. pavillon Occ. pabalhon Ct. pavelló Sp. pabellón It. padiglione 'pavilion' Fr. papillon Occ. parpalhon Cat. papallona OIt. parpaglione 'butterfly'	trauis	Gallo-Romance analogical nominative in place of CL trabs 'beam' or 'structure built around a beam' (obl. stem trab-).	PR. */ˈtraβe/^{acc}OFr. tref 'tent, beam' OOcc. trau Ast. trabe 'beam' Pt. trave It. trave
pabula (Note: Read: papula.)	blister	—	uisica (Note: Read: uesica.)	Could have this meaning in CL as well, but its main sense was 'bladder'.	PR. */βekˈsika/ Fr. vessie Occ. vessiga Cat. veixiga Sp. vejiga Ast. vexiga Pt. bexiga It. vescica Srd. bussica Ro. bășică 'blister, bladder'
paria	alike.NEUT.PL.ADJ	PR. */ˈparʲa/ Fr. paire Pie. paira It. paia 'pair(s)'	similia	CL synonym in this context.	PR. */ˈsɪmɪles/ OFr. sembles OOcc. sembles
pera	bag	—	sportellam	CL for 'little basket'.	PR. */sporˈtɛlla/ OOcc. esportèla Sp. esportilla OIt. sportella Srd. isportedda
peribet (Note: Read: perhibet.)	bear.3SG	—	perportat	The context is Ioannes testimonium perhibet (John 1:15), 'John bears witness'.	Fr. il porte témoignage It. porta testimonianza
pes	foot	—	pedis	Gallo-Romance analogical nominative in place of CL pes (obl. stem ped-).	OFr. piez^{nom}OOcc. pes
pes	foot	—	pedis	Gallo-Romance analogical nominative in place of CL pes (obl. stem ped-).	PR. */ˈpɛde/^{acc}OFr. piet Fr. pied Occ. pè Cat. peu Ara. piet Sp. pie Ast. pie, pía Pt. pe Rms. pe Vgl. pi It. piede Srd. pede ORo. piez
pignus	pledge	PR. */ˈpɪɡnʊs/ OSp. pennos Sp. peño	uuadius	Frankish *waddi.	Fr. gage Occ. gatge 'will, testament'
pignus	pledge	PR. */ˈpɪɡnu/ Rms. pegn It. pegno	uuadius	Frankish *waddi.	Fr. gage Occ. gatge 'will, testament'
pignus	pledge	PR. */ˈpɪɡnora/ Sp. prenda OIt. pegnora	uuadius	Frankish *waddi.	Fr. gage Occ. gatge 'will, testament'
pignus	pledge	PR. */pɪɡˈnore/ Pt. penhor	uuadius	Frankish *waddi.	Fr. gage Occ. gatge 'will, testament'
pingues	fat.PL.ADJ	—	grassi	An alteration of CL crassi.	PR. */ˈɡrassi/^{nom}OFr. gras Vgl. gres It. grassi Ro. grași
pingues	fat.PL.ADJ	—	grassi	An alteration of CL crassi.	PR. */ˈɡrassos/^{acc}Fr. gras Cat. grassos Sp. grasos Pt. grassos Rms. gras Srd. grassos
plaustra	carts	—	carra	Alteration of CL carrus 'wagon' to the neuter gender.	PR. */ˈkarras/ Ro. care
plaustra	carts	—	carra	Alteration of CL carrus 'wagon' to the neuter gender.	PR. */ˈkarri/ OFr. char It. carri
plaustra	carts	—	carra	Alteration of CL carrus 'wagon' to the neuter gender.	PR. */ˈkarros/ Fr. chars Occ. carris Cat. carros Sp. carros Pt. carros
pulempta (Note: Read: polenta.)	barley	PR. */poˈlɛnta/ Vgl. polianta It. polenta Srd. pulenta	farina	CL for 'flour'.	PR. */faˈrina/ Fr. farine Gsc. haria Occ. farina Cat. farina Sp. harina Ast. fariña Pt. farinha Pie. farin-a Rms. farina Vgl. faraina It. farina Srd. farina Ro. făină
pupillam	pupil.ACC	—	nigrum in oculo	Periphrase, lit. 'the black (part) in an eye'.	Fr. le noir de l'œil
ponatur	put.3SG.PASS.SBJV	PR. */ˈponere/ Fr. pondre Gsc. póner Occ. pondre Cat. pondre Rib. ponre 'lay an egg' Sp. poner OPt. põer Pt. pôr It. porre Srd. ponnere Ro. punere 'put, place'	mittatur	CL mittere 'send' came to mean 'put' in LL.	PR. */ˈmɪttere/ Fr. mettre Gsc. méter Occ. metre Cat. metre Rib. metre Sp. meter Pt. meter It. mettere Srd. mintere
ponderatus	burdened	—	grauiatus	Past participle of *grauiare, postclassical verb based on CL grauis 'heavy, burdened'.	PR. */ɡraˈβʲatʊs/ OFr. gregiez
poplite	hock.ABL	—	iuncture ianiculorum (Note: Read: iuncturae geniculorum.)	Periphrase, lit. 'junctions of the knees'.	PR. */junkˈturas/ Fr. jointures Occ. jonchuras Cat. juntures Sp. junturas Pt. junturas It. giunture
poplite	hock.ABL	—	iuncture ianiculorum	Periphrase, lit. 'junctions of the knees'.	PR. */ɡeˈnʊkli/^{nom}OFr. genoil Vgl. zenacle It. ginocchi Ro. genunchi
poplite	hock.ABL	—	iuncture ianiculorum	Periphrase, lit. 'junctions of the knees'.	PR. */ɡeˈnʊklos/^{acc}OFr. genoilz Fr. genoux Occ. genolhs Cat. genolls Ara. chenollos Sp. hinojos Ast. xenoyos Pt. joelhos Rms. schanugls Srd. brenucos
pruina	frost	PR. */pruˈina/ Fr. bruine 'drizzle' OOcc. bruina 'frost' Vnz. puìna 'ricotta cheese' It. brina 'frost' Ast. pruína 'hoarfrost'	gelata	Compound based on CL gel- (obl. stem of gelus 'frost') + -ata, a Romance noun-forming suffix.	PR. */ɡeˈlata/ OFr. gelede Fr. gelée Occ. gelada Cat. gelada Sp. helada Pt. geada Pie. gelada It. gelata Srd. ghelada
pugione	dagger.ABL	—	lancea	CL for 'spear'.	PR. */ˈlankʲa/ Fr. lance Occ. lança Cat. llança Sp. lanza Ast. llancia Pt. lança It. lancia Srd. lantza
pulchra	beautiful.F.SG	—	bella	CL synonym.	PR. */ˈbɛlla/ Fr. belle Occ. bèla Cat. bella Ara. bella Rms. bella Vgl. biala It. bella Sic. beḍḍa
pusillum	small.ACC	—	paruum	CL synonym.	PR. */ˈparβu/ OFr. parf 'small' Ast. parva 'small breakfast' Pt. parvo 'small, dumb'
pusillum	small.ACC	—	paruum	CL synonym.	PR. */ˈparβʊlu/^{dim}OIt. parvolo It. pargolo 'boy'
pustula	blister	—	malis clauis (Note: Read: malus clauus.)	Clauus had this sense in CL as well, although its main meaning was 'nail'.	PR. */ˈklaβu/ Fr. clou 'nail, pustule' OOcc. clau (Note: Was a homophone for 'key' (=Lat. clavem) in Old Occitan (Levy 1923: 78), a problem that was eventually solved by substituting the diminutive [klaβɛ́l] as the term for 'nail'.); Cat. clau Rib. cllau Ara. clau Sp. clavo Pt. cravo Pie. ciòv OIt. chiavo (Note: Modern chiodo appears to have been influenced by words like chiudere 'shut'.); Srd. cravu 'nail'
regit	rule.3SG	PR. */ˈrɛɡɪt/ It. regge Srd. reghet	gubernat	CL synonym borrowed from Greek κῠβερνᾰ́ειν.	PR. */ɡʊˈβɛrnat/ OFr. governet Fr. gouverne Occ. governa Cat. governa Sp. gobierna Pt. governa It. governa Srd. cuberrat
remetieur	remeasure.3SG.FUT	PR. */meˈtire/ Sp. medir Ast. midir Pt. medir Srd. metire	remensurabit	Verb based on CL mensura 'measure'.	PR. */mesuˈrare/ Fr. mesurer Occ. mesurar Cat. mesurar Sp. mesurar Pt. mesurar Rms. mesirar It. misurare Ro. măsurare
repente	suddenly	Sp. de repente	subito	CL synonym.	PR. */ˈsʊβɪto/ OFr. sode (Note: Feminine form of the adjective, found spelled as sode. The masculine form *sot is unattested.) Occ. sopte Cat. sopte (Note: Today found only in the expression de sobte.)
reppererunt	find.3PL.PRET	—	inuenerunt	CL synonym.	OFr. *envindrent (Note: There is a single attestation of the participle envengud in Old French. The word is otherwise nowhere to be found.); OSrd. *imbennerun
res	thing	PR. */ˈres/^{nom} Gsc. arrés Occ. res Cat. res 'nothing' Sp. res Srd. rese 'head of cattle'	causa	CL for 'subject matter'.	PR. */ˈkau̯sa/ Fr. chose Occ. causa Cat. cosa Sp. cosa OPt. cousa Pt. coisa Rms. chossa Vgl. causa It. cosa OSrd. casa
res	thing	PR. */ˈrɛne/^{acc} OFr. rien 'thing' Fr. rien Lim. ren Gsc. arrén OPt. ren Glc. ren 'nothing'	causa	CL for 'subject matter'.	PR. */ˈkau̯sa/ Fr. chose Occ. causa Cat. cosa Sp. cosa OPt. cousa Pt. coisa Rms. chossa Vgl. causa It. cosa OSrd. casa
respectant	look_back.3PL	PR. */resˈpɛktant/ Pt. respeitam It. rispettano	reuuardant	Compound based on Frankish *wardōn 'watch + re-.	Fr. regardent Occ. gardan^{-pref} Cat. guarden^{-pref}Sp. guardan^{-pref} Pt. guardam^{-pref} Lmb. vàrden Rms. vurdan^{-pref} It. riguardano Nap. guardano^{-pref}
restant	stay.3PL	—	remanent	CL synonym.	PR. */reˈmanent/ OFr. remainent Cat. romanen It. rimangano OSp. remane Ro. rămân
reus	guilty	PR. */ˈrɛu/ Vgl. ri It. rio Ro. rău 'bad, evil'	culpabilis	LL synonym.	PR. */kʊlˈpaβɪle/ Fr. coupable Occ. colpable It. colpevole 'guilty'
reueretur	fear.3SG	—	uerecundatur	CL for 'feel shame'.	PR. */βerˈɡʊndat/ OFr. vergondet
rostrum	beak	PR. */ˈrostru/ Sp. rostro Pt. rosto 'face' Ro. rost 'mouth'	beccus	A borrowing of Gaulish *bekkos.	PR. */ˈbɛkkʊs/ OFr. bes
rostrum	beak	PR. */ˈrostru/ Sp. rostro Pt. rosto 'face' Ro. rost 'mouth'	beccus	A borrowing of Gaulish *bekkos.	PR. */ˈbɛkku/ Fr. bec Occ. bèc Cat. bec Sp. pico Pt. bico It. becco
rufa	reddish.3SG	—	sora	Frankish *saur.	Fr. saur 'smoked, yellow' Occ. saura 'yellow' Cat. saura 'dark yellow'
ruga	wrinkle	PR. */ˈruɡa/ It. ruga 'wrinkle' ARo. arugã 'sheep-gate'	fruncetura	Compound based on Frankish *hrunkja 'wrinkle' + -tura, a noun-forming suffix.	Fr. fronçure
rupem	rock.ACC	PR. */ˈrupe/ It. rupe 'cliff'	petram	CL borrowing of Greek πέτρα.	PR. */ˈpɛtra/ OFr. piedre Fr. pierre Occ. pèira Cat. pedra Sp. piedra Pt. pedra Vgl. pitra It. pietra Ro. piatră
saga	cloak	PR. */ˈsaja/ Fr. saie OSp. saya Pt. saia 'skirt'	cortina	LL for 'curtain', from an earlier CL term for a type of cauldron. The sense evolution is unclear.	PR. */korˈtina/ Fr. courtine Occ. cortina Cat. cortina Sp. cortina OPt. cortinha It. cortina
sagma	packsaddle	—	soma	The same word after a number of sound changes.	PR. */ˈsau̯ma/ Fr. somme 'packsaddle' Occ. sauma 'female donkey' Cat. salma 'ton' It. soma (Note: There is a single attestation of the participle envengud in Old French. The word is otherwise nowhere to be found.) 'load, burden' It. salma 'corpse'
sagma	packsaddle	—	sella	CL synonym	PR. */ˈsɛlla/ Fr. selle Occ. sèla Cat. sella OSp. siella Sp. silla Pt. sela Vgl. siala It. sella Sic. seḍḍa Srd. sedda Ro. șa 'saddle'
saniore	healthy.COMP.ABL	—	plus sano	Periphrase, lit. 'more healthy'. Synthetic comparative characteristic of Romance.	PR. */plus ˈsanu/ Fr. plus sain Occ. pus san OCat. pus san OPt. chus são Lig. chu san Pie. pi san It. più sano Srd. prus sanu
sarcina	package	PR. */ˈsarkɪna/ Ro. sarcină ARo. sartsinã	bisatia	Reinterpretation of CL bisaccia 'double-sacks' as a feminine singular noun.	PR. */bɪˈsakʲa/ Fr. besace Gsc. besaça Occ. biaço It. bisaccia
sartago	pan	PR. */sarˈtaɡɪne/ Occ. sartan Nap. sartayine Sp. sartén Glc. sartaña Pt. sertã Srd. sartaghine	patella	CL synonym	PR. */paˈtɛlla/ OFr. padela Fr. poêle Occ. padèla Cat. paella Sp. padilla Rms. padella It. padella Sic. pareḍḍa
scinifes	gnats	—	cincellas	Likely of onomatopoeic origin.	PR. */tʲinˈtʲalas/ OFr. cinceles Vnz. sginsałe It. zanzare Ro. țânțari^{masc}
segetes	crops	—	messes	CL synonym.	PR. */ˈmɛsses/ Ct. messes It. messi Sp. mieses Pt. messes
segetes	crops	—	messes	CL synonym.	PR. */mesˈsjones/ OFr. meissons Fr. moissons Occ. meissons
semel	once	—	una uice	Romance periphrase, lit. 'one time'. In CL uice meant 'turn, instance'.	PR. */una ˈβɪke/ OFr. une feis (Note: The reason for the initial consonant devoicing to /f/ is unclear.); Fr. une fois Occ. una vets Sp. una vez Pt. uma vez
sepulta	interr.F.SG.PASS.PTCP	PR. */seˈpʊlta/ Vgl. sepualta It. sepolta^{lit}	sepelita	Rare CL variant.	PR. */sepeˈlita/ OFr. sevelide Fr. ensevelie^{+pref} Occ. sebelida Cat. sebollida It. seppellita
sindone	cloth	PR. */sɪnˈdone/ It. sindone	linciolo (Note: Read: linteolo.)	CL synonym.	PR. */lɪnˈtʲɔlu/ Fr. linceul Occ. lençòl Cat. llençol Sp. lenzuelo Pt. lençol Rms. lenziel Vgl. linẑòl It. lenzuolo
singulariter	individually	—	solamente	Compound based on CL sola ('alone') + mente, a Romance adverb-forming suffix derived from CL mente (abl. of mens 'mind'), often found in ablative absolutes such as sollicita mente 'assiduously', lit. 'with an assiduous mind'.	PR. */sola ˈmɛnte/ OFr. solement Fr. seulement Occ. solament Cat. solament OSp. solamiente Pt. somente It. solamente
si uis	if want.2SG	—	si uoles	Regularization of uis, cf. CL conjugations such as uolunt.	PR. */si ˈβɔles/ OFr. se vuels Fr. *si veux Occ. se vòls Cat. si vols Rms. sche vuls Vgl. se vule It. se vuoi Srd. si boles
solutis	free.PASS.PTCP.DAT/ABL.PL	PR. */soˈlutos/^{acc} OFr. soluz 'resolved, paid'	disligatis	Past participle of disligare, a compound based on CL dis-, a negating prefix, + ligare 'tie'.	PR. */dɪslɪˈɡatos/ OFr. desliez Fr. déliés OSp. deslegados OPt. deslegados
solutis	free.PASS.PTCP.DAT/ABL.PL	PR. */soˈlutos/^{acc} OFr. soluz 'resolved, paid'	disligatis	Past participle of disligare, a compound based on CL dis-, a negating prefix, + ligare 'tie'.	PR. */dɪslɪˈɡati/ It. sligati Ro. dezlegați
sortileus (Note: Read: sortilegus.)	fortune-teller	—	sorcerus	Rendering of *sortiarius, a postclassical compound based on CL sors, sortis 'fortune' + -arius, a suffix denoting occupation.	PR. */sorˈtʲarʲu/^{acc} Fr. sorcier
spatula	palm-frond	Pr. */sˈpatʊla/ OFr. espalle Fr. épaule Oc. espatla Ct. espattla Sp. espalda Pt. espalda Vnz. spała It. spalla Sic. spaḍḍa 'shoulder'	rama palmarum	Periphrase, lit. 'palm-tree branch'. Rama reflects a collective form based on CL ramus 'branch'.	PR. */ˈrama/ OFr. raime Fr. rame (Note: The expected outcome would have been /ʁɛm/. The modern form appears to have taken its initial vowel from the original diminutive rameau, where the /a/ was unstressed and hence did not change to /ɛ/ (TLFi: "rame").); Occ. rama Cat. rama Sp. rama 'branch'
spatula	palm-frond	Pr. */sˈpatʊla/ OFr. espalle Fr. épaule Oc. espatla Ct. espattla Sp. espalda Pt. espalda Vnz. spała It. spalla Sic. spaḍḍa 'shoulder'	rama palmarum	Periphrase, lit. 'palm-tree branch'. Rama reflects a collective form based on CL ramus 'branch'.	PR. */ˈpalmas/ OFr. palmes Fr. paumes Occ. palmas Cat. palmes Sp. palmas Pt. palmas It. palme Srd. parmas Ro. palme
stercora	excrement	PR. */sˈtɛrku/ OSp. estierco Pt. esterco It. sterco Ro. șterc	femus (Note: Read: fimus.)	CL synonym.	PR. */ˈfɛmʊs/ OFr. fiens Occ. fens Cat. fem Ara. fiemo
stercora	excrement	PR. */sˈtɛrkore/ Sp. estiércol	femus	CL synonym.	PR. */ˈfɛmʊs/ OFr. fiens Occ. fens Cat. fem Ara. fiemo
submersi	drown.PASS.PTCP.PL	PR. */sʊmˈmɛrsi/ It. sommersi	necati	CL for 'murdered'.	See necetur.
subtilissima	very.thin.F	PR. */sʊpˈtile/ OFr. sotil OOcc. sotil OCat. sotil It. sottile Srd. suttile Ro. subțire	perpittita	Compound based on CL per-, an intensifying prefix, + pittita 'small', a postclassical word of obscure origin.	PR. */pɪtˈtita/ Fr. petite Cat. petita Occ. petita
succendunt	ignite.3PL	—	sprendunt	Rendering of *exprendunt, a postclassical compound based on CL ex- + prehendere 'seize'.	PR. */sˈprɛndʊnt/ Fr. éprennent
sudario	priest's_gown.DAT/ABL	PR. */sudaˈrʲɔlu/^{dim} Vgl. sedarul 'handkerchief'	fanonem	Compound based on Frankish *fano 'cloth' + -o, -onis, originally a noun-forming suffix but now serving merely as an extender.	Fr. fanon 'papal gown'
sulcis	ridges.DAT/ABL	PR. */ˈsʊlki/^{nom} It. solchi Nap. surchi	rige	Gaulish *rica.	OFr. reies Fr. raies Occ. regas
sulcis	ridges.DAT/ABL	PR. */ˈsʊlkos/^{acc} Cat. solcs Sp. surcos Pt. sucos Srd. surcos	rige	Gaulish *rica.	OFr. reies Fr. raies Occ. regas
sus	pig	PR. */ˈsue/ Srd. sue	porcus	CL synonym.	See entry for aper.
talpas	moles.ACC	PR. */ˈtalpas/ Fr. taupes Occ. talpas Cat. talps^{masc} Sp. topos^{masc} Glc. toupas It. talpe Srd. tarpas	muli	Borrowing of Frankish *mul.	Fr. mulot^{dim} 'field mouse'
tectum	roof	PR. */ˈtektu/ OFr. teit Fr. toit Gsc. teit Occ. tech Sp. techo Glc. teito Pt. teto Pie. tèit Lmb. tecc Rms. tetg Vgl. tiat It. tetto	solarium	CL for 'roof-terrace'.	PR. */solˈarʲu/ Fr. solier Gsc. solèr 'loft'
tedet (Note: Read: taedet.)	annoy.3SG	—	anoget	Rendering of *inodiat, a postclassical verb based on CL odium 'hate'. Note that the intervocalic ⟨g⟩ represents /j/.	PR. */ɪˈnɔjat/ Fr. ennuie Occ. enoja Cat. enutja Sp. enoja Ast. anoxa Pt. enoja It. uggia^{-pref}
tedio	monotony.DAT/ABL	—	tepiditas	Compound based on CL tepid- (obl. stem of tepidus 'lukewarm') + -itas, a suffix denoting quality.	PR. */ˈtɛpɪdu/ OFr. tieve Fr. tiède Lim. tedde Occ. tèbe Cat. tebi Sp. tibio Ast. tebiu Pt. tíbio It. tiepido Srd. tépiu 'lukewarm'
tereo (Note: Read: tero.)	thresh.1SG	—	tribulo	Verb based on CL tribulum 'threshing-board', ultimately a derivative of tero.	PR. */ˈtriblo/ OFr. trible, triule Cat. trillo Sp. trillo Ast. triyu, tríu Pt. trilho It. tribbio Srd. triulo Ro. treier
teristrum (Note: Read: theristrum.)	garment	—	cufia	Frankish *kuffja.	OFr. cofie Fr. coiffe Gsc. còho Occ. còfa Ast. cofia Pt. coifa
teristrum	garment	—	uitta	CL for 'headband'.	PR. */ˈβɪtta/ OFr. vete Cat. veta Sp. beta Pt. fita It. vetta Ro. bată
torax (Note: Read: thorax.)	cuirass	—	brunia	Frankish *brunnia.	OFr. bronie Fr. broigne OOcc. bronha
trabem	beam.ACC	See entry for mastus.	trastrum (Note: Read: transtrum.)	CL for 'crossbeam'. OFr. tref < trabem could mean 'tent' as well, so this gloss serves to clarify the intended meaning.	PR. */ˈtrastu/ OFr. traste 'crossbeam' Sp. trasto Pt. traste 'junk'
transferent	carry_across.3PL.FUT	—	transportent	CL synonym.	PR. */trasˈpɔrtant/ OFr. tresportent OIt. traportano
transgredere	pass_by.IMP.SG	—	ultra alare	Ultra is CL for 'beyond'. Alare is a Latinized spelling of OFr. aler 'go'.	OFr. oltre aler
transmeare	swim_across.INF	—	transnotare	Notare is an alteration of CL natare 'swim' via vowel dissimilation.	PR. */trasnoˈtare/ OFr. *tresnoder OIt. tranotare
transmeare	swim_across.INF	—	transnotare	Notare is an alteration of CL natare 'swim' via vowel dissimilation.	PR. */noˈtare/^{-pref} OFr. noder Rms. nodar Vgl. notur OIt. notare (Note: Modern Italian nuotare, with the extension of the /wɔ/ diphthong from rhizotonic conjugations such as nuoto to all other forms of the verb.); Rm înotare^{+pref}
tugurium	hut	—	cauana	Of obscure origin.	PR. */kaˈpanna/ OFr. chavane Occ. cabana Cat. cabanya Ara. capanna Sp. cabaña Pt. cabana It. capanna
turibulum (Note: Read: thuribulum.)	incense burner	—	incensarium	LL incens- (obl. stem of incensum 'incense') + -arium 'place for keeping'.	PR. */ɪnkenˈsarʲu/ OFr. encensier 'incense burner' Fr. encensier 'rosemary'
thurmas (Note: Read: turmas.)	crowds.ACC	PR. */ˈtʊrmas/ It. torme Frl. torme Ro. turme Srd. trumas	fulcos	A borrowing of Frankish *folc 'people'.	OFr. fols Fr. foules^{fem}OOcc. folcs Gsc. huras^{fem} Occ. fulas^{fem} Glc. foulas^{fem}
tutamenta	defenses	—	defendementa	Compound based on CL defendere 'protect' + -mentum, a noun-forming suffix.	OFr. defendemenz
uecors	senseless	—	esdarnatus	Past participle of *esdarnare, a verb based on es- (later form of CL ex-)+ Frankish *darn 'bewildered'.	Fr. dial. darne 'stumbling, impulsive'
ueru	roasting-spit	PR. */βerˈrʊklu/^{dim} (Note: Diminutive of ueru. Geminate r taken from ferru(m) 'iron' (Malkiel 1983: 474).); OFr. veroil Fr. verrou (Note: Back-formation from OFr. plural /veˈrus/ < earlier /veˈruʎts/ (TLFi: "verrou"). The expected outcome of the singular /veˈroʎ/ would have been */vɛʁuj/, cf. fenouil < *fenúclu.); Prv. ferrolh Occ. varrolh Cat. forrolh Sp. cerrojo Pt. ferrolho (Note: Old Portuguese had the expected form /veˈroʎo/, which later acquired an initial /f/ by analogy with ferro 'iron'. (This happened to the Provençal and Catalan cognates as well.) Similarly, Old Spanish had /βeˈroʒo/, which later acquired the initial consonant of cerrar, meaning 'shut' (Malkiel 1983: 474).); It. verrocchio	spidus	Frankish *spit.	OFr. espeiz^{nom}
ueru	roasting-spit	PR. */βerˈrʊklu/^{dim} OFr. veroil Fr. verrou Prv. ferrolh Occ. varrolh Cat. forrolh Sp. cerrojo Pt. ferrolho It. verrocchio	spidus	Frankish *spit.	OFr. espeit^{acc} Fr. époi Sp. espeto Ast. espetu Pt. espeto
uespertiliones	bats	PR. */βesperˈtɛllu/^{dim} Ast. esperteyu OIt. vipistrello It. pipistrello	calues sorices (Note: Read: caluas sorices.)	An expression based on CL caluas 'bald' + sorices 'shrewmice'.	PR. */ˈkalβas soˈrikes/ Fr. chauves-souris
uestis	garment	PR. */βestɪˈmɛntu/ Fr. vêtement Rms. büschmaint Vgl. vestemiant Ro. veșmânt	rauba	Frankish *rauba 'spoils of war, garments'	Fr. robe Occ. rauba Cat. roba Sp. ropa Pt. roupa It. roba
uim	power.ACC	—	fortiam	Reinterpretation of CL fortia 'strong' as a feminine noun.	PR. */ˈfɔrtʲa/ Fr. force Occ. força Cat. força Sp. fuerza Ast. fuercia, forcia Pt. força Rms. forza It. forza
uiscera	guts	—	intralia	Analogous to CL interanea, both ultimately compounds based on Archaic Latin *inter- 'inside' + -anea or -alia, both adjective-forming suffixes.	PR. */ɪnˈtralʲas/ Fr. entrailles Occ. entralhas
uiscera	guts	—	intralia	Analogous to CL interanea, both ultimately compounds based on Archaic Latin *inter- 'inside' + -anea or -alia, both adjective-forming suffixes.	PR. */ɪnˈtranʲas/ OFr. entragnes Cat. entranyes Sp. entrañas Pt. entranhas
ungues	fingernails	—	ungulas	CL diminutive of ungues.	PR. */ˈʊnɡlas/ Fr. ongles Occ. onglas Cat. ungles Sp. uñas Ast. uñes Pt. unhas Rms. unglas Vgl. jongle It. unghie Ro. unghii Srd. ungras
uorax	devouring	—	manducans	CL for 'chewing'. Manducare went on to become the standard word for 'eat' in many Romance languages.	PR. */mandʊˈkando/^{ger} Fr. mangeant Occ. manjant Cat. menjant Rms. mangiond OIt. manicando Ro. mâncând Srd. mandicande
urguet	urge_forward.3SG	—	adastat	Frankish *haist 'haste'.	OOcc. adasta
usuris	loan_interest.DAT/ABL.PL	—	lucris	CL for 'profits, wealth'.	PR. */ˈlʊkri/^{nom} ARo. lucri 'objects' Ro. (lucruri) 'things'
usuris	loan_interest.DAT/ABL.PL	—	lucris	CL for 'profits, wealth'.	PR. */ˈlʊkros/^{acc} OFr. loirs 'revenues, assets' Sp. logros Pt. logros 'achievements'
utere	use.IMP.SG	—	usitare	CL freq. of utere.	PR. */ˈusa/ Fr. use Occ. usa Cat. usa Sp. usa Pt. usa It. usa
utres	wineskins	PR. */ˈʊtres/ Sp. odres Pt. odres It. otri ARo. utri	folli	CL folles 'leather bags, bellows'.	PR. */ˈfɔlles/ OFr. fols Fr. fous Occ. fòls Cat. folls 'madmen, fools' Sp. fuelles Pt. foles OIt. folli Ro. foale Srd. foddes 'bellows'
uuas	grapes.ACC	PR. */ˈuβas/ Sp. uvas Pt. uvas Rms. ieuvas It. uve Vgl. joive ARo. & ORo. aue	racemos	CL for 'clusters, bunches' often in reference to grapes.	PR. */raˈkimos/ Fr. raisins Occ. rasim Cat. raïms 'grapes' Sp. racimos Pt. racimos 'clusters'
uuas	grapes.ACC	PR. */ˈuβas/ Sp. uvas Pt. uvas Rms. ieuvas It. uve Vgl. joive ARo. & ORo. aue	racemos	CL for 'clusters, bunches' often in reference to grapes.	PR. */raˈkimʊli/^{dim} It. racimoli 'clusters'

== See also ==
- Appendix Probi
- Proto-Romance language
- Lexical changes from Classical Latin to Proto-Romance
- Phonological changes from Classical Latin to Proto-Romance

== Sources ==
=== General ===
- Adams, James Noel (2007). The Regional Diversification of Latin, 200 BC–AD 600. Cambridge University Press. ISBN 978-0-521-88149-4.
- Alkire, Ti; Rosen, Carol (2010). Romance Languages: A Historical Introduction. New York: Cambridge University Press. ISBN 978-0-521-88915-5.
- Anderson, James Maxwell; Rochet, Bernard (1979). Historical Romance Morphology. Ann Arbor: University Microfilms International. ISBN 978-0835704625.
- Diez, Friedrich Christian (1870). Anciens glossaires romans corrigés et expliqués. Translated by Bauer, Alfred. Paris: Librairie A. Franck. OCLC 4070810.
- Elcock, William Dennis (1960). The Romance Languages. London: Faber and Faber.
- Engels, J. (October 1968). "Les 'Gloses de Reichenau' réédités". Neophilologus. 52: 378–386. doi:10.1007/BF01515488. S2CID 163995291.
- Hall, Robert Anderson (1981). Proto-Romance Morphology. Philadelphia: John Benjamins.
- Jensen, Frede (1972). From Vulgar Latin to Old Provençal. University of North Carolina Press.
- Jensen, Frede (1986). The Syntax of Medieval Occitan. Tübingen: Niemeyer.
- Jensen, Frede (1990). Old French and Comparative Gallo-Romance Syntax. Tübingen: Niemeyer.
- Lausberg, Heinrich (1970). Lingüística románica. Vol. I: Fonética. Madrid: Gredos.
- Levy, Emil (1923). Petit dictionnaire provençal-français. Heidelberg: Winter.
- Lloyd, Paul M. (1987). From Latin to Spanish. Philadelphia: American Philosophical Society.
- Loporcaro, Michele (2018). Gender from Latin to Romance. Oxford University Press.
- Malkiel, Yakov (July–September 1944). "The Etymology of Portuguese Iguaria". Language. 20 (3): 108–130. doi:10.2307/410151. JSTOR 410151.
- Malkiel, Yakov (1983). From Particular to General Linguistics: Selected Essays 1965–1978. Amsterdam: John Benjamins.
- Meyer-Lübke, Wilhelm (1911). Romanisches etymologisches Wörterbuch. Heidelberg: C. Winter.
- Marchot, Paul (1901). Petite phonétique du français prélittéraire: VIe–Xe siècles. Fribourg: B. Veith.
- Pei, Mario (1941). The Italian Language. New York: Columbia University Press.
- Pope, Mildred K. (1934). From Latin to French, with Especial Consideration of Anglo-Norman. Manchester University Press.
- Posner, Rebecca (1996). The Romance Languages. Cambridge University Press.
- Quirós, Manuel (1986). "Las glosas de Reichenau". Filología y Lingüística. 12: 43–50.
- Rossi, Mario (2004). Dictionnaire étymologique et ethnologique des parlers brionnais. Paris: Publibook.
- Williams, Edwin Bucher (1962). From Latin to Portuguese. Philadelphia: University of Pennsylvania Press.

=== Online etymological dictionaries ===
- Dexonline
- Online Etymology Dictionary
- Trésor de la langue Française informatisé
- Treccani
