= Appendix Probi =

List of erroneous Latin words

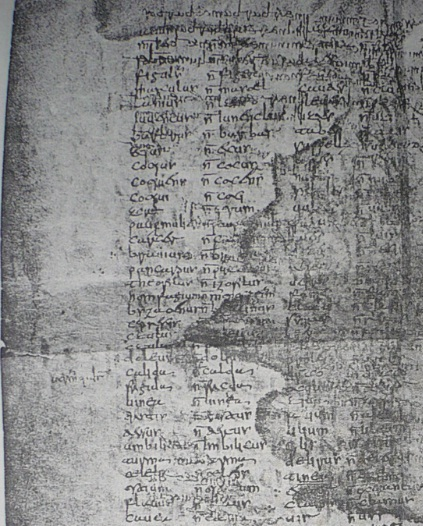
1892 photocopy of the Appendix

The Appendix Probi (Probus's Appendix) is the conventional name for a series of five documents believed to have been copied in the seventh or eighth century in Bobbio, Italy. Its name derives from the fact that the documents were found attached to a copy of the Instituta Artium, a treatise named after (but probably not written by) the first-century grammarian Marcus Valerius Probus.

The Appendix was likely composed in Rome (Note: There is a reference on line 134 to caput africae, the name of a grammar school known to have been located in that city.) around the first half of the fourth century AD.

It is specifically the third of the five documents that has attracted scholarly attention, as it contains a list of 227 spelling mistakes, along with their corrections, which shed light on the phonological and grammatical changes that the local vernacular was experiencing in the early stages of its development into Romance.

The text survives only in a carelessly transcribed water-damaged manuscript of the 7th or 8th century which is kept at the Biblioteca Nazionale Vittorio Emanuele III as MS Lat. 1 (formerly Vindobonensis 17).

== Phenomena visible in the spelling mistakes ==
Note that the format is "[correct spelling], not [incorrect spelling]". Scribal abbreviations have been expanded.

=== Syncope ===
- speculum non speclum
- masculus non masclus
- uernaculus non uernaclus
- angulus non anglus
- uetulus non ueclus (Note: Note the regular dissimilation, after syncope, of /-tl-/ to /-kl-/.)
- uitulus non uiclus
- articulus non articlus
- oculus non oclus
- calida non calda
- uiridis non uirdis

=== Development of yod from front vowels in hiatus ===
- uinea non uinia
- cauea non cauia
- lancea non lancia
- ostium non osteum
- lilium non lileum
- alium non aleum
- tolonium non toloneum

=== Change of /ŭ/ to [o] ===
- columna non colomna
- turma non torma
- coluber non colober

=== Reduction of pretonic /au̯/ to [o] ===
- auris non oricla (Note: The diminutive of auris is auricula.)

=== Loss of final /m/ ===
- pridem non pride
- olim non oli
- idem non ide
- nunquam non nunqua
- passim non passi

=== Loss of /h/ ===
- adhuc non aduc
- hostiae non ostiae

=== Reduction of /-ns-/ to /-s-/ ===
- mensa non mesa
- ansa non asa
- formosus non formunsus (Note: An example of hypercorrection (Elcock 1960: 30), in this case the improper insertion of a silent ⟨n⟩, cf. the spellings herculens and occansio below.)
- Hercules non Herculens
- occasio non occansio

=== Loss of intervocalic /β/ before a back vowel ===
- riuus non rius
- flauus non flaus
- auus non aus
- pauor non paor

=== Confusion of /b/ and /β/ ===
- baculus non uaclus
- brauium non brabium
- alueus non albeus
- plebes non pleuis
- uapulo non baplo

=== Confusion of singletons and geminates ===
- camera non cammara
- garrulus non garulus
- basilica non bassilica
- aqua non acqua
- draco non dracco

=== Elimination of imparisyllabic nouns ===
- grus non gruis
- pecten non pectinis
- glis non glirus

=== Adaptation of 3rd-decl. adjectives to the 1st class ===
- tristis non tristus
- pauper mulier non paupera mulier
- acre non acrum
- ipse non ipsus

=== Adaptation of 4th-decl. feminine nouns to the 1st decl. ===
- nurus non nura
- socrus non socra

=== Adaptation of 3rd/4th decl. feminines to the 1st decl. via diminutive suffix ===
- auris non oricla
- fax non facla
- neptis non nepticla
- anus non anucla

=== Adaptation of neuter plural to the first declension ===
- uico castrorum non uico castrae

=== Elimination of the ablative ===
- nobiscum non noscum
- uobiscum non uoscum

=== Alteration of nom. -es (in the third declension) to -is ===
- cautes non cautis
- tabes non tabis
- uates non uatis
- uulpes non uulpis
- fames non famis
- sedes non sedis

=== Reduction of the endings -es and -is to -s (Note: Perhaps by analogy with existing words like urbs or plebs (Elcock 1960: 32).) ===
- orbis non orbs
- nubes non nubs

=== Loss of the masculine flexion -us ===
- figulus non figel (Note: The unusual forms figel and mascel may reflect the replacement of the diminutive ending -ulus with -ellus, followed by the loss of both final /s/ and the unstressed /ŭ/. While the change may seem to foreshadow e.g. the Romansh form maschel, such forms are unusual for the time period and would not be seen again until the Kassel glosses (Elcock 1960: 32).)
- masculus non mascel
- barbarus non barbar

=== Metathesis, assimilation, dissimilation, etc. ===
- persica non pessica
- iuniperus non ieniperus
- grundio non grunnio
- sibilus non sifilus
- pegma non peuma
- coqus non cocus
- coquens non cocens
- coqui non coci

== See also ==
- Reichenau Glossary
- Proto-Romance language
- Palatalization in the Romance languages
- Phonological changes from Classical Latin to Proto-Romance

== Sources ==
- Barnett, F. J. 2007. The sources of the "Appendix Probi": A new approach. The Classical Quarterly 57(2). 701–736. doi:10.1017/s000983880700064x.
- Elcock, William Dennis. 1960. The Romance Languages. London: Faber & Faber.
- Rohfls, Gerhard. 1969. Sermo Vulgaris Latinus: Vulgarlateinisches Lesebuch. 2nd edn. Tübingen: Max Niemeyer Verlag.
- Leppänen, V., & Alho, T. 2018. On The Mergers Of Latin Close-Mid Vowels. Transactions of the Philological Society. doi:10.1111/1467-968x.12130
- Powell, Jonathan G. F. 2007. A new text of the "Appendix Probi". The Classical Quarterly 57(2). 687–700. doi:10.1017/S0009838807000638.
- Quirk, Ronald J. 2005. The “Appendix Probi” as a compendium of Popular Latin: Description and bibliography. The Classical World 98(4). 397–409. doi:10.2307/4352974
- Quirk, Ronald J. 2006. The Appendix Probi: A scholar's guide to text and context. Newark: Juan de la Cuesta.
- Quirk, Ronald J. 2017. Hypercorrection in the Appendix Probi. Philologus 161(2). 350–353. doi:10.1515/phil-2016-0119
