= Phonological changes from Classical Latin to Proto-Romance =

Historic sound changes in Latin

An approximate summary of the sound changes from Classical Latin to Proto-Romance is provided below. Their precise order is uncertain.

== General changes ==
- /h/ is lost without a trace in all positions.
  - If that results in a collision of identical short vowels, they fuse into the corresponding long vowel, as in /koˈhorte/ > /ˈkoːrte/.
- Final (unstressed) /m/ is lost without a trace (except, likely, for lengthening, visible in the outcomes of -um and -im, see Romance languages § Unstressed vowels for details) in polysyllabic words, as in /ˈnunkʷam/ > /ˈnunkʷa/.
  - In (stressed) monosyllables it tends to survive as /n/, as in /ˈkʷem/ > /ˈkʷen/ > Spanish quién.
- Clusters consisting of a stop followed by a liquid consonant draw the stress position forward, as in /ˈinteɡram/ > /inˈteɡra/.
  - Two apparent counterexamples are /ˈpalpebraːs/ and /ˈpullitra/, judging by the Old French outcomes palpres and poltre.
- /n/ is lost before fricatives, leaving the preceding vowel lengthened (but no longer nasalised), as in /ˈsponsa/ > /ˈspoːsa/.
  - /n/ is often retained or later restored if it belongs to a prefix (in- or con-) or to a word which has forms where a fricative does not follow /n/, as in /deːˈfensa/ > French défense, thanks to related forms such as the infinitive /deːˈfendere/ > French défendre.
- Sequences of two /i(ː)/ generally merge to a single long /iː/, as in /au̯ˈdiiː, konˈsiliiː/ > /au̯ˈdiː, koːˈsiliː/.
- In some outlying rural areas, the diphthongs /ae̯/ and /au̯/ are reduced to /eː/ and /oː/ respectively in Classical times. Influence from such dialects made a number of Latin words acquire monophthongized variants early on, as in /ˈfae̯ks~ˈfeːks/ or /ˈkau̯lis~ˈkoːlis/. Most words, however, remain unaffected by this.
  - Later, by about the second century AD, "mainstream" Latin experiences a general monophthongization of /ae̯/ to /ɛː/, (Note: Note that the result is an open-mid /ɛː/, distinct from the close-mid /eː/ that results from the earlier "rural" monophthongization.) and of /oe̯/ to /eː/, and /au̯/ remains intact in most cases, as in /'lae̯ta, 'poe̯na, 'au̯rum/ > /'lɛːta, 'peːna, 'au̯ru/.
- /w/ turns into the fricative /β/, as does original /b/ in intervocalic position, as in /ˈwiːwere, ˈtrabem/ > /ˈβiːβere, ˈtraβe/.
  - Intervocalic /β/ in contact with a rounded vowel tends to disappear, as in /ˈriːwus/ > /ˈriːβus/ > /ˈriːus/.
    - It is often restored if other forms of the word have a non-rounded vowel following /β/, as in the nominative plural /ˈriːβiː/.
- In hiatus, unstressed front vowels become /j/, and unstressed back vowels become /w/, as in /ˈfiːlius, ˈsapuiː/ > /ˈfiːljus, ˈsapwiː/.
  - The same process also affects stressed front and back vowels in hiatus if they are antepenultimate (in the third-to-last syllable of a word). When /j/ is produced, primary stress shifts to the following vowel, but when /w/ is produced, primary stress shifts instead to the preceding syllable, as in /fiːˈliolus, teˈnueram/ > /fiːˈljolus, ˈtenwera/.
  - If /w/ is formed after a geminate consonant, it is deleted, as in /batˈtuere/ > /ˈbattwere/ > /ˈbattere/.
  - /w/ is deleted before unstressed back vowels, as in /ˈkarduus, ˈunɡuoː/ > /ˈkardwus, ˈunɡwoː/ > /ˈkardus, ˈunɡoː/.
    - /w/ is occasionally deleted before unstressed non-back vowels as well, as in /februˈaːrius/ > /feˈβrwaːrjus/ > /feˈβraːrjus/.
    - Similarly, /kʷ/ is delabialized to /k/ before back vowels, whether they are stressed or not, as in /ˈkʷoːmodo, ˈkokʷoː/ > /ˈkoːmodo, ˈkokoː/.
  - If those changes result in sequences of /je(ː)/ or /wo(ː)/, they merge to /eː/ and /oː/ respectively, as in /paˈrieteːs, duˈodekim/ > /paˈrjeteːs, ˈdwodeki/ > /paˈreːteːs, ˈdoːdeki/.
  - If /j/ forms after /kʷ/, the resulting /kʷj/ simplifies and delabializes to /kj/, as in /ˈlakʷeum/ > /ˈlakʷju/ > /ˈlakju/.
- /u/ is raised before /i(ː)/ or /j/, as in [ˈkʊi̯, ˈfʊiː] > [ˈkui̯, ˈfuiː] > Italian cui, fui (not *coi, *foi).
- /ɡ/ before /m/ vocalizes to /u̯/, as in /fraɡˈmenta, ˈsaɡma/ > /frau̯ˈmenta, ˈsau̯ma/.
- /ks/ is reduced to /s/ before or after a consonant, as in /ˈkalks, ˈsekstus/ > /ˈkals, ˈsestus/, or at the end of words of more than one syllable.
  - Intervocalically, it sometimes metathesizes to /sk/, as in /ˈwiːksit/ > /ˈβiːskit/.
- Words beginning with /sC/ receive an initial supporting vowel [ɪ], unless they are preceded by a word ending in a vowel, as in [ˈskɔla] > [ɪsˈkɔla].
  - The earliest unambiguous attestations occur in inscriptions of the second century AD. In some Romance languages, such as Spanish, word-initial /sC/ remains phonologically forbidden to this day. In other languages, such as Romanian, the supporting vowel seems to have been abandoned early on, resulting in restoration of initial /sC/. Although there is barely any direct inscriptional evidence of the supporting vowel in Latin inscriptions in the Balkans, its development and subsequent loss is considered to be indirectly attested by the dropping of word-initial /e/ before /sC/ in cases in which it was not originally a supporting vowel, as in Romanian spulbera 'to dust', from *ex-pulverāre. Compare also /ˈskala, eksˈkadere/ > *[ɪsˈkala, eskaˈdere] > Italian scala, scadere; French échelle, échoir.
- /eː/ and /oː/ before /stj/ are raised, respectively, to /iː/ and /uː/, as in /ˈbeːstia, ˈoːstium/ > /ˈbiːstja, ˈuːstjo/ > Italian biscia, uscio.
- Compound verbs stressed on a prefix are usually reconstructed according to their prefixless equivalent, with their stress shifted forward from the prefix, as in /ˈdispliket/ (Note: Etymologically dis- + placet, with the unstressed /a/ modified to /i/ in Old Latin. In the unprefixed form placet, the /a/ remained unchanged since it was stressed.) > */disˈplaket/, by analogy with the simplex form /ˈplaket/.
  - /ˈrekipit/ simply yields /reˈkipit/ (rather than */reˈkapit/), perhaps because the verb, while recognisable as a compound, was not easy to identify with the original /ˈkapit/.
  - Some words such as /ˈkolliɡoː/ 'fasten' are apparently not recognised as compounds at all and so remain unchanged.
- Monosyllabic nouns ending in a consonant receive an epenthetic final /e/, as in /ˈrem/ > /ˈren/ > /ˈrene/ > French rien. (Compare /ˈbene/ > French bien.)
- Phonemic vowel length gradually collapses via the following changes (which only affect vowel length, not quality; this process appears to have been finished by the 5th century, compare Vulgar Latin § Loss of vowel quantity):
  - Long vowels shorten in unstressed syllables.
  - Long vowels shorten in stressed closed syllables.
  - Short vowels lengthen in stressed open syllables.
- On account of the above, the vowel inventory changes from /iː i eː e a aː o oː u uː/ to /i ɪ e ɛ a ɔ o ʊ u/, with pre-existing differences in vowel quality achieving phonemic status and with no distinction between original /a/ and /aː/. Additionally:
  - Unstressed /ɛ/ and /ɔ/ merge into /e/ and /o/ respectively.
  - In the second syllable of words with the structure [ˌσσˈσσ], /i/ and /u/ merge into /ɪ/ and /ʊ/ respectively.
- Word-internal /j/ merges into a preceding consonant and palatalises it, as in /ˈkaːseum/ > /ˈkaːsju/ > /ˈkasʲu/ > Italian /ˈkatʃo/.

== Sporadic changes ==
- Vowels other than /a/ are often syncopated in unstressed word-internal syllables, especially in contact with liquid consonants or, to a lesser extent, nasal consonants or /s/, as in /ˈanɡulus, ˈkalida, ˈspekulum/ > /ˈanɡlʊs, ˈkalda, ˈspɛklu/.
  - In a few words, unstressed initial syllables followed by /r/ experience syncope, as in /kʷiriːˈtaːre, diːˈreːktus/ > /kriˈtare, ˈdrektʊs/.
  - If syncope results in /β/ being followed by a consonant, it may vocalize to /u̯/, as in /ˈfabula/ > /ˈfaβla/ > */ˈfau̯la/ > Italian fòla (cf. Romanian faulă).
  - If syncope results in /tl/, the cluster is generally replaced by /kl/, as in /ˈwetulus/ > /ˈβɛklʊs/.
- In cases where a long vowel precedes a geminate consonant, one of the elements often shortens unpredictably, sometimes leading to such doublets as /ˈkuppa~ˈkuːpa/ > /ˈkʊppa~ˈkupa/ > Spanish copa, cuba; French coupe, cuve.
  - Long vowels sometimes shorten early on in closed syllables even if followed by two different consonants, leading to variations such as /ˈuːndekim~ˈundekim/ > /ˈundekɪ~ˈʊndekɪ/ > Italian undici, Spanish once.
  - Conversely, the cluster [ŋk] may lengthen preceding vowels early on, as in [ˈkʷɪŋkʷɛ] > [ˈkʷiːŋkʷɛ] > [ˈkiŋkʷɛ].
- Pretonic vowels sporadically assimilate to or dissimilate from the stressed vowel of the following syllable.
  - /a/ can dissimilate to /o/ before a following /a/, as in /naˈtaːre/ > /noˈtare/.
  - /iː/ can dissimilate to /e/ before a following /iː/, as in /diːˈwiːnus, wiːˈkiːnus/ > /deˈβinʊs, βeˈkinʊs/.
  - /au̯/ can dissimilate to /a/ before a following /u(ː)/, as in /au̯ˈɡustus, au̯skulˈtaːre/ > /aˈɡʊstʊs, askʊlˈtare/.
  - /o/ can dissimilate to /e/ before a following back vowel, as in /roˈtundus, soˈroːre/ > /reˈtʊndʊs, seˈrore/.
  - /i/ can assimilate to a following /a(ː)/, as in /silˈwaːtikus/ > /salˈβatɪkʊs/.
  - /eː/ can assimilate to a following /oː/, as in */reːniˈoːne/ > */roˈnʲone/.
  - /iː/ can assimilate to a following /eː/, as in /diːˈreːktus/ > */deˈrektʊs/.
- /oː/ and /u/ may yield a low-mid vowel if followed by /β/, as in /ˈoːwum, ˈkolubra/ > /ˈɔβu, koˈlɔβra/ > Italian uovo, Sardinian colòra.
- /a/ may yield a mid vowel if preceded by /j/, as in /jakˈtaːre/ > */jekˈtare/.
- /r/ assimilates to a following /s/ in a number of cases, as in /ˈdorsum/ > /ˈdɔssu/.
  - After a long vowel, the resulting /ss/ reduces to /s/, as in /ˈsuːrsum/ > /ˈsusu/.
- Initial /kr/ and /kV/ sometimes voice, as in /ˈkrassus/ > /ˈɡrassʊs/.
  - This is particularly frequent with borrowings from Greek. κρυπτή, καμπή > */ˈɡrʊpta, ˈɡamba/ > Italian grotta, gamba.
- /nd/ sometimes assimilates to /nn/, as in the alternation grundīre~grunnīre.
- There is occasional loss or assimilation of final /s/, but it is nowhere regular until a much later period.
- When two neighbouring syllables each contain /r/, one /r/ frequently dissimilates to /l/ or is deleted.

== See also ==
- Appendix Probi
- Proto-Romance language
- Palatalization in the Romance languages

== Bibliography ==
- Adams, James Noel (2007). The regional diversification of Latin. Cambridge University Press.
- Adams, James Noel (2013). Social variation and the Latin language. Cambridge University Press.
- Allen, William Sidney (1965). Vox Latina: A guide to the pronunciation of Classical Latin. Cambridge University Press.
- Chambon, Jean-Pierre (2013). "Notes sur un problème de la reconstruction phonétique et phonologique du protoroman: Le groupe */ɡn/". Bulletin de la Société de Linguistique de Paris. CVIII: 273–282.
- Elcock, William Dennis (1960). The Romance languages. London: Faber and Faber.
- Ferguson, Thaddeus (1976). A history of the Romance vowel systems through paradigmatic reconstruction. Berlin: De Gruyter.
- Gouvert, Xavier (2015). "Le système phonologique du protoroman: essai de reconstruction". In Buchi, Éva; Schweickard, Wolfgang (eds.). Dictionnaire Étymologique Roman. Beihefte zur Zeitschrift für romanische Philologie. Vol. 381. De Gruyter. ISBN 9783110453614.
- Gouvert, Xavier (2016). "Du protoitalique au protoroman: deux problèmes de reconstruction phonologique". In Buchi, Éva & Schweickard, Wolfgang (eds.). Dictionnaire Étymologique Roman 2. Beihefte zur Zeitschrift für romanische Philologie. Vol. 402. De Gruyter. pp. 27–51.
- Grandgent, C. H. (1907). An introduction to Vulgar Latin. Boston: D.C. Heath & Co.
- Hall, Robert Anderson (1976). Proto-Romance phonology. New York: Elsevier.
- Jensen, Frede (1972). From Vulgar Latin to Old Provençal. Chapel Hill: University of North Carolina Press.
- Lausberg, Heinrich (1970). Lingüística románica. Vol. I: Fonética. Madrid: Gredos.
- Leppänen, V.; Alho, T. (2018). "On the mergers of Latin close-mid vowels". Transactions of the Philological Society. 116 (3): 460–483. doi:10.1111/1467-968X.12130. S2CID 150148733.
- Lloyd, Paul M. (1987). From Latin to Spanish. Philadelphia: American Philological Society.
- Loporcaro, Michele (2011). "Phonological processes". In Maiden, Martin; Smith, John Charles; Ledgeway, Adam (eds.). The Cambridge history of the Romance languages. Vol. 1. Cambridge University Press.
- Loporcaro, Michele (2015). Vowel length from Latin to Romance. Oxford University Press.
- Penny, Ralph (2002). A history of the Spanish language. Cambridge University Press.
- Politzer, Robert L. (1953). Romance trends in 7th and 8th century Latin documents. Chapel hill: University of North Carolina Press.
- Pope, Mildred K. (1934). From Latin to modern French. Manchester University Press.
- Sampson, Rodney (2010). Vowel Prosthesis in Romance: A Diachronic Study. Oxford University Press.
- Zampaulo, André (2019). Palatal sound change in the Romance languages: Diachronic and synchronic perspectives. Oxford Studies in Diachronic and Historical Linguistics. Vol. 38. Oxford University Press. ISBN 9780192534293.
