= Proto-Romance language =

Reconstructed ancestor of the Romance languages

Proto-Romance
- Reconstruction of: Romance languages
- Region: Roman Empire
- Reconstructed ancestors: Proto-Indo-European: Proto-Italic
- Lower-order reconstructions: Common Romanian; Proto-Italo-Western Romance

Proto-Romance is the result of applying the comparative method to reconstruct the latest common ancestor of the Romance languages. The closest real-life counterpart to Proto-Romance would have been a colloquial variety of Late Latin sometimes referred to as Vulgar Latin.

== Phonology ==
=== Vowels ===
==== Monophthongs ====
	Front	Central	Back
Close	i		u
Near-close	ɪ		ʊ
Close-mid	e		o
Open-mid	ɛ		ɔ
Open		a	

==== Diphthong ====
/au̯/ appears to be the only phonemic diphthong that can be reconstructed.

==== Phonetics ====
- Vowels were lengthened in stressed open syllables.
- Stressed /ɛ ɔ/ may have yielded incipient diphthongs like [e͡ɛ o͡ɔ] in metaphonic conditions. (Note: That is, when followed by a syllable containing a close vowel.)
  - Metaphony, if it can be projected back to Proto-Romance, may have initially been limited to open syllables. That is, it would have targeted allophonically lengthened /ɛ ɔ/.

==== Constraints ====
- /ɛ ɔ/ did not occur in unstressed position.
- /i u/ did not occur in the second syllable of words with the structure ˌσσˈσσ. (Note: Diachronically this reflects the ‘weakening’ of vowels in this context, for which see Lausberg 1970:§§292–6. An example, per the latter, is Latin dormītorium > French dortoir.)

=== Consonants ===
Burger (1955:25)
		Labial		Alveolar		Dorsal	
		plain	pal.	plain	pal.	palatal	velar
Nasal		m	mʲ	n	nʲ		
Plosive	voiceless	p	pʲ	t	tʲ	kʲ	k
Plosive	voiced	b	bʲ	d	dʲ	ɡʲ	ɡ
Fricative	voiceless	f	fʲ	s	sʲ		
Fricative	voiced	β	βʲ				
Approximant				l	lʲ	(j)	(w)
Trill				r	rʲ		

Hall (1976:61)
		Labial	Dental	Velar
Nasal		m	n	
Plosive	voiceless	p	t	k
Plosive	voiced	b	d	g
Fricative		f	s	
Approximant			l	
Tap			ɾ	

==== Palatalized consonants ====
- There is scholarly disagreement over whether palatalization was phonemic in Proto-Romance. (Note: In representing it as such this article follows Burger 1955 and Petrovici 1956. Similarly, van den Bussche 1985 proposes a Proto-Romance consonant inventory with /ʎʎ ɲɲ (t)tʲ (d)dʲ (k)kʲ (ɡ)ɡʲ/ (p. 226) and Pope 1952 reconstructs Proto-Gallo-Romance with a series of palatalized consonants (§168). Gouvert 2015 prefers a phonetic palatalization rule for Proto-Romance, as in /basiˈare/ [baˈsʲaːɾe] (p. 83).)
- Palatalized consonants tended to geminate between vowels. The extent of this varied by consonant. (Note: Gouvert assumes regular (phonetic) gemination of palatalized intervocalic /n l k/ to [ɲɲ ʎʎ cc]. Repetti points out that there exists (mixed) Romance evidence for the gemination of all consonants in this context other than original /s/.)
- /tʲ/ would have been an affricate like [t͡sʲ] or [t͡zʲ].

==== Phonetics ====
- /sC/ in word-initial position was assigned a prop-vowel [ɪ], as in /ˈstare/ [ɪsˈtaːɾe]. (Note: Example from Gouvert. Per Lausberg the prop-vowel would have been added only after a consonant or pause.)
- /ɡn/ was likely [ɣn] at first, with later developments varying by region. (Note: Lausberg supposes an initial [ɣn~i̯n].)
- /d ɡ/ might have been fricatives or approximants between vowels.
- /ll/ might have been retroflex. (Note: For further discussion on /ll/, see Zampaulo 2019:71–7 and Lausberg 1970:§§494–9.)
- /f/ might have been bilabial.

==== Constraints ====
- /b/ did not occur in intervocalic position. (Note: Diachronically this reflects the development of Latin intervocalic [b] to [β], and likewise [bj] to [βj], for which see Lausberg 1970:§§366, 475.)

== Morphology ==
The forms below are spelt as they are in the cited sources, either in Latin style or in phonetic notation. The latter may not always agree with the phonology given above.

=== Nouns ===
Nouns are reconstructed as having three cases: a nominative, an accusative, and a genitive-dative: (Note: de Dardel & Gaeng (1992:104) differ from Lausberg on the following points: 1) They believe that the genitive-dative case was limited to animate nouns. 2) They reconstruct a universal gen-dat. plural ending -orum. 3) They reconstruct, for class -a type nouns, a nominative plural -ae, albeit one in competition with -as according to de Dardel & Wüest (1993:57). They are in agreement with Lausberg regarding the remaining inflections.)

Type	-a (f)		-o (m)		-C (m)		-C (f)	
Number	SG	PL	SG	PL	SG	PL	SG	PL
NOM	capra	capras	caballus	caballi	frater	fratres/-i	noctis	noctes
ACC	capra	capras	caballu	caballos	fratre	fratres	nocte	noctes
GEN-DAT	caprae	capris	caballo	caballis	fratri	fratris	nocti	noctis
Gloss	‘goat’		‘horse’		‘brother’		‘night’	

Some nouns of the –C type had inflections with alternating stress or syllable count:

Type	-C (m)		-C (f)	
Number	SG	PL	SG	PL
NOM	hómo	hómines/-i	múlier	muliéres
ACC	hómine	hómines	muliére	muliéres
GEN-DAT	hómini	hóminis	muliéri	muliéris
Gloss	‘man’		‘woman’	

There were also ‘neuter’ nouns. In the singular they would have been treated as masculine and in the plural as feminine, often with a collective sense.

Type	-o (n)		-C (n)	
Number	SG	PL	SG	PL
NOM	bracchiu	bracchia	corpus	corpora
ACC	bracchiu	bracchia	corpus	corpora
GEN-DAT	bracchio	bracchiis	corpori	corporis
Gloss	‘arm’		‘body’	

=== Adjectives ===
==== Positive ====
Lausberg (1973:§§668–73)
Type	-o/-a							
Gender	M		F		M		F	
Number	SG	PL	SG	PL	SG	PL	SG	PL
NOM	bonus	boni	bona	bonas	virdis	virdes/-i	virdis	virdes
ACC	bonu	bonos	bona	bonas	virde	virdes	virde	virdes
GEN-DAT	bono	bonis	bonae	bonis	virdi	virdis	virdi	virdis
Gloss	‘good’				‘green’			

==== Comparative ====
For the most part, the typical way to form a comparative would have been to add magis or plus (‘more’) to a positive adjective. A few words can be reconstructed as having a comparative ending -ior, which would have been inflected as follows:

Number	SG	
Gender	M or F	N
NOM	mélior	mélius
ACC	melióre	mélius
Gloss	‘better’	

==== Superlative ====
Superlatives would have been formed by adding definite articles to comparatives.

=== Pronouns ===
==== Personal ====
===== Tonic =====
The stressed or 'strong' forms:

Person	1		2	
Number	SG	PL	SG	PL
NOM	ego	nos	tu	vos
ACC	me/mene	nos	te/tene	vos
DAT	mi/mibi	nobis	ti/tibi	vobis

Person	3 (m)		3 (f)	
Number	SG	PL	SG	PL
NOM	ille/illi/ipse	illi/ipsi	illa/ipsa	illas/ipsas
ACC	illu/ipsu	illos/ipsos	illa/ipsa	illas/ipsas
(GEN-)DAT	illui/ipsui	illoru/ipsoru	illaei/ipsaei	illoru/ipsoru

===== Atonic =====
The unstressed or 'weak' forms:

Person	1		2		3 (m)		3 (f)	
Number	SG	PL	SG	PL	SG	PL	SG	PL
ACC	me	nos	te	vos	lu	los	la	las
DAT	mi	nos	tī	vos	li	lis	li	lis

==== Interrogative/relative ====
As follows:

Gender	M or F	N
NOM	qui	quid (/quod?)
ACC	quem	quid (/quod?)
DAT	cui	–

=== Verbs ===
==== Present ====
van den Bussche (1985:§2.3.2)
Verb class	1P		2P		3P		Infinitive
Verb class	SG	PL	SG	PL	SG	PL	Infinitive
I	kánto	kantámųs	kántas	kantátįs	kántat	kántant	kantáre
IIa	dǫ́rm(j)o	dormímųs	dǫ́rmįs	dormítįs	dǫ́rmįt	dǫ́rmųnt/-ent	dormíre
IIb	florésko/-í-	florímųs	floréskįs/-í-	florítįs	floréskįt/-í-	floréskųnt/-í-	floríre
IIIa	wį́dd’o	wįdémųs	wį́des	wįdétįs	wį́det	wį́dųnt/-ent (wį́dd’ųnt)	wįdére
IIIb	wę́ndo	wę́ndįmųs	wę́ndįs	wę́ndįtįs	wę́ndįt	wę́ndųnt/-ent	wę́ndere
Irregular	dáo	dámųs	dás	dátįs	dát	dánt/dáųnt/dáent	dáre
Irregular	ábjo/ájjo	abémųs	áes/ás	abétįs	áet/át	ánt/áųnt/áent	abére

==== Preterite ====
van den Bussche (1985:§2.3.3)
Verb class	1P		2P		3P		Infinitive
Verb class	SG	PL	SG	PL	SG	PL	Infinitive
I	kantáj	kantámmųs	kantásti	kantástįs	kantáwt/-át	kantárųnt	kantáre
IIa	dormíj	dormímmųs	dormísti	dormístįs	dormíwt/-ít	dormírųnt	dormíre
IIIb	battę́j	battę́mmųs	battę́sti	battę́stįs	battę́wt/-ę́t	battę́rųnt	báttere
Irregular	féki	fékįmųs/-kį́mm-	fekį́sti	fekį́stįs	fékįt	fékerųnt/-ér-	fákere
Irregular	díksi	díksįmųs/-kį́mm-	dikį́sti	dikį́stįs	díksįt	díkserųnt	díkere

==== Participles ====
van den Bussche (1985:§2.3.4)
Verb Class	present	preterite
I	kantánte	kantátų
II	dormę́nte	dormítų
III	wendę́nte	(wę́ndįtų/-útų)

== See also ==
- Phonological changes from Classical Latin to Proto-Romance

== Bibliography ==
- Adams, James Noel (2013). Social variation and the Latin language. Cambridge University Press. doi:10.1017/CBO9780511843433. ISBN 978-0-511-84343-3.
- Alkire, Ti; Rosen, Carol (2010). Romance languages: A historical introduction. Cambridge University Press. ISBN 978-0-521-88915-5.
- Barbato, Marcello (2022). "The early history of Romance palatalizations". Oxford Research Encyclopedias. doi:10.1093/acrefore/9780199384655.013.750. ISBN 978-0-19-938465-5.
- Burger, André (1955). "Phonématique et diachronie à propos de la palatalisation des consonnes romanes". Cahiers Ferdinand de Saussure. 13 (13): 19–33. JSTOR 27757997.
- Chambon, Jean-Pierre (2013). "Notes sur un problème de la reconstruction phonétique et phonologique du protoroman: Le groupe */ɡn/". Bulletin de la Société de Linguistique de Paris. CVIII (1): 273–282. doi:10.2143/BSL.108.1.3019219.
- de Dardel, Robert & Gaeng, Paul Ami (1992). "La declinaison nominale du latin non classique: Essai d'une methode de synthese". Probus. 4 (2): 91–125. doi:10.1515/prbs.1992.4.2.91.
- de Dardel, Robert & Wüest, Jakob (1993). "Les systèmes casuels du protoroman: Les deux cycles de simplification". Vox Romanica (52): 25–65.
- Dworkin, Steven N. (2016). "Do romanists need to reconstruct Proto-Romance? The case of the Dictionnaire Étymologique Roman project". Zeitschrift für romanische Philologie (132): 1–19. doi:10.1515/zrp-2016-0001.
- Elcock, William Dennis (1960). The Romance languages. London: Faber and Faber.
- Ferguson, Thaddeus (1976). A history of the Romance vowel systems through paradigmatic reconstruction. Berlin: De Gruyter. doi:10.1515/9783110806960. ISBN 978-3-11-080696-0.
- Gouvert, Xavier (2015). "Le système phonologique du protoroman: essai de reconstruction". In Buchi, Éva; Schweickard, Wolfgang (eds.). Dictionnaire Étymologique Roman. Berlin: De Gruyter. pp. 61–128. doi:10.1515/9783110313482. ISBN 978-3-11-031244-7.
- Gouvert, Xavier (2016). "Du protoitalique au protoroman: deux problèmes de reconstruction phonologique". In Buchi, Éva & Schweickard, Wolfgang (eds.). Dictionnaire Étymologique Roman 2. Berlin: De Gruyter. pp. 27–51. doi:10.1515/9783110453614. ISBN 978-3-11-045361-4.
- Grandgent, Charles Hall (1907). An introduction to Vulgar Latin. Boston: D.C. Heath & Co.
- Hall, Robert Anderson (1976). Proto-Romance phonology. New York: Elsevier. ISBN 978-0-444-00183-2.
- Hall, Robert Anderson (1983). Proto-Romance morphology. Philadelphia: John Benjamins. ISBN 978-90-272-3522-0.
- Lausberg, Heinrich (1970) [1965]. Lingüística románica. Vol. I–II. Translated by Pérez Riesco, José; Pascual Rodríguez, E. (2nd ed.). Madrid: Gredos.
  - Original in German: Romanische Sprachwissenshaft. Berlin: De Gruyter. 1956–62.
- Loporcaro, Michele (2015). Vowel length from Latin to Romance. Oxford University Press. doi:10.1093/acprof:oso/9780199656554.003.0001.
- Lloyd, Paul Max (1987). From Latin to Spanish: Historical phonology and morphology of the Spanish language. Philadelphia: American Philosophical Society. ISBN 978-0-87169-173-6.
- Lyons, Christopher (1986). "On the origin of the Old French strong-weak possessive distinction". Transactions of the Philological Society. 84 (1): 1–41. doi:10.1111/j.1467-968X.1986.tb01046.x.
- Maiden, Martin (2016). "Diphthongization". In Ledgeway, Adam; Maiden, Martin (eds.). The Oxford guide to the Romance languages. Oxford University Press. pp. 647–57. doi:10.1093/acprof:oso/9780199677108.001.0001. ISBN 978-0-19-967710-8.
- Operstein, Natalie (2010). Consonant structure and prevocalization. Current Issues in Linguistic Theory. Vol. 312. Amsterdam: John Benjamins. doi:10.1075/cilt.312. ISBN 978-90-272-4828-2.
- Petrovici, Emil (1956). "Problema moştenirii din romanica comună a corelaţiei palatale a consoanelor în limba romînă". Ştudii şi Cercetări Lingvistice. 7: 163–9.
- Pope, Mildred Katherine (1952) [1934]. From Latin to Modern French (2nd ed.). Manchester University Press.
- Repetti, Lori (2016). "Palatalization". In Ledgeway, Adam; Maiden, Martin (eds.). The Oxford guide to the Romance languages. Oxford University Press. pp. 658–68. doi:10.1093/acprof:oso/9780199677108.001.0001. ISBN 978-0-19-967710-8.
- van den Bussche, Henri (1985). "Proto-Romance inflectional morphology. Review of Proto-Romance morphology by Robert Hall". Lingua. 66 (2–3): 225–60. doi:10.1016/S0024-3841(85)90336-5.
- Zampaulo, André (2019). Palatal sound change in the Romance languages: Diachronic and synchronic perspectives. Oxford University Press. doi:10.1093/oso/9780198807384.001.0001. ISBN 978-0-19-880738-4.
