= Voiced dental fricative =

Consonantal sound represented by ⟨ð⟩ in IPA

ð
- IPA number: 131

Audio sample
- source · help

Encoding
- Entity (decimal): &#240;
- Unicode (hex): U+00F0
- X-SAMPA: D
- Braille: ⠻ (braille pattern dots-12456)
Image

Voiced dental approximant

ð̞

Audio sample
- source · help
Image

A voiced dental fricative is a consonant sound used in some spoken languages. It is familiar to most English-speakers as the ⟨th⟩ sound in father.

The symbol in the International Phonetic Alphabet for this sound is eth ⟨ð⟩, which was taken from the Old English and Icelandic alphabets. In Old English, the letter was used interchangeably with thorn ⟨þ⟩ for either this sound or its unvoiced counterpart, IPA: [θ]; in Icelandic, eth is solely used for this sound, and thorn its unvoiced counterpart. Such fricatives are often called "interdental" because they are often produced with the tongue between the upper and lower teeth (as in Received Pronunciation), and not just against the back of the upper teeth, as they are with other dental consonants.

The letter ⟨ð⟩ is sometimes used to represent a voiced dental approximant, a similar sound, which no language is known to contrast with a dental non-sibilant fricative. However, the approximant can be explicitly indicated with the lowering diacritic: ⟨ð̞⟩. Rarely, this sound has also been transcribed as a dentalised alveolar approximant ⟨ɹ̪⟩. It has been proposed that either a turned ⟨ð⟩ or reversed ⟨ð⟩, among others, be used as a dedicated symbol for the dental approximant; however, despite occasional usage, none have gained general acceptance. Like the fricative, the approximant may also be articulated interdentally in some languages.

Dental fricatives are rare as phonemes. Almost all languages of Europe and Asia lack the sound. Native speakers of languages without the sound often have difficulty enunciating or distinguishing it, and they replace it with a voiced alveolar sibilant [z], a voiced dental stop or voiced alveolar stop [d], or a voiced labiodental fricative [v]; known respectively as th-alveolarization, th-stopping, and th-fronting. As for Europe, there seems to be a great arc where the sound (and/or its unvoiced variant) is present. Most of Mainland Europe lacks the sound. However, some "periphery" languages such as Greek have the sound in their consonant inventories, as phonemes or allophones.

Within Turkic languages, Bashkir and Turkmen have both voiced and voiceless dental non-sibilant fricatives among their consonants. Among Semitic languages, they are used in Modern Standard Arabic, albeit not by all speakers of modern Arabic dialects, and in some dialects of Hebrew and Assyrian.

== Features ==
Sagittal section of a voiced dental fricative

Features of a voiced dental non-sibilant fricative:

- Its manner of articulation is fricative, which means it is produced by constricting air flow through a narrow channel at the place of articulation, causing turbulence. It does not have the grooved tongue and directed airflow, or the high frequencies, of a sibilant.
- Its place of articulation is dental, which means it is articulated with either the tip or the blade of the tongue at the upper teeth, termed respectively apical and laminal. Note that most stops and liquids described as dental are actually denti-alveolar.
- Its phonation is voiced, which means the vocal cords vibrate during the articulation.
- It is an oral consonant, which means that air is not allowed to escape through the nose.
- It is a median consonant, which means it is produced by directing the airstream down the midline of the tongue, rather than to the sides.
- Its airstream mechanism is pulmonic, which means it is articulated by pushing air only with the intercostal muscles and abdominal muscles, as in most speech sounds.

== Occurrence ==
Language		Word	IPA	Meaning	Notes
Albanian		idhull	[iðuɫ]	'idol'	
Aleut		damo	[ðɑmo]	'house'	
Arabic	Modern Standard	ذهب / đeheb	[ˈðæhæb]	'gold'	See Arabic phonology
Arabic	Gulf	ذهب / đeheb	[ˈðæhæb]	'gold'	
Arabic	Najdi	ذهب / đeheb	[ˈðæhæb]	'gold'	
Arabic	Tunisian	ذهب / đeheb	[ˈðhæb]	'gold'	See Tunisian Arabic phonology
Arabic	Egyptian	ذهب / đeheb	['ðæhab]		
Arpitan	Genevan and Savoyard	Genèva	[ðə'nɛːva]	'Geneva'	Generally represents the "j" and "ge/gi" phonemes in standard spelling.
Arpitan	Bressan	vachiére	[va'θiðə]	'woman cow herder'	Bressan dialect, like the Geneva and many Savoy ones, express "j" and "ge/gi" (in standard Arpitan spelling) as voiced dental fricatives. In addition, however, its dialects often express the intervocalic "r" as such as well.
Aromanian		zală	[ˈðalə]	'butter whey'	Corresponds to [z] in standard Romanian. See Romanian phonology
Asturian	Some dialects	fazer	[fäˈðeɾ]	'to do'	Alternative realization of etymological ⟨z⟩. Can also be realized as [θ].
Bashkir		ҡаҙ / qađ / قاذ(historically)	[qɑð]	'goose'	Corresponds to Ҙ
Berta		[fɛ̀ːðɑ̀nɑ́]		'to sweep'	
Burmese		အညာသား	[ʔəɲàðá]	'inlander'	Commonly realized as an affricate [d̪͡ð].
Bengali		দ়বাই	[ðɔbɐi]	ˈslaughter'	Only occurs in loanwords. See Bengali phonology
Breton	Gwenedeg, Enez Sun	da zoue	[da ˈðuːe]	'of god'	Corresponds with [z] in other dialects.
Cornish		omdhiskwedhes	[ɔmðiskˈwɛːðɛz]	'to feature'	See Cornish phonology and Standard Written Form
Cree	Woods Cree (th-dialect)	nitha	[niða]	'I'	Reflex of Proto-Algonguian */r/. Shares features of a sonorant.
Dahalo					Weak fricative or approximant. It is a common intervocalic allophone of /d̪/, and may be simply a plosive [d̪] instead.
Elfdalian		baiða	[ˈbaɪða]	'wait'	
Emilian	Bolognese	żänt	[ðæ̃:t]	'people'	
English	Received Pronunciation	this	[ðɪs]	'this'	
English	Western American English	this	[ð̪͆ɪs]	'this'	Interdental.
Extremaduran		ḥazel	[häðel]	'to do'	Realization of etymological ⟨z⟩. Can also be realized as [θ]
Fijian		ciwa	[ðiwa]	'nine'	
Galician	Some dialects	fazer	[fɐˈðeɾ]	'to do'	Alternative realization of etymological ⟨z⟩. Can also be realized as [θ, z, z̺].
German	Austrian	leider	[ˈlaɛ̯ða]	'unfortunately'	Intervocalic allophone of /d/ in casual speech. See Standard German phonology
Greek		δάφνη / dáfni	[ˈðafni]	'laurel'	See Modern Greek phonology
Gwich'in		niidhàn	[niːðân]	'you want'	
Hän		ë̀dhä̀	[ə̂ðɑ̂]	'hide'	
Harsusi		[ðebeːr]		'bee'	
Hebrew	Iraqi	אדוני	[ʔaðoˈnaj]	'my lord'	Commonly pronounced [d]. See Modern Hebrew phonology
Hebrew	Temani	גָּדוֹל / ğaḏol	[dʒaðol]	'large, great'	See Yemenite Hebrew
Icelandic		það / thath	[θaːð]	'it'	
Judeo-Spanish	Many dialects	קריאדֿור / kriador	[kɾiaˈðor]	'creator'	Intervocalic allophone of /d/ in many dialects.
Kabyle		ḏuḇ	[ðuβ]	'to be exhausted'	
Kurdish		ئازان	[a.ðan]		An approximant; postvocalic allophone of /d/. See Kurdish phonology
Malay	Standard	azan	[a.ðan]	'azan'	Only in Arabic loanwords; usually replaced with /z/. See Malay phonology
Malto		मेद़ / mēð	[meːð]	'body'	See Malto phonology
Mari	Eastern dialect	шодо	[ʃoðo]	'lung'	
Norman	Jèrriais	méthe	[mɛð]	'mother'	Predominantly found in western Jèrriais dialects; otherwise realised as [ɾ], and sometimes as [l] or [z].
Northern Sámi		dieđa	[d̥ieðɑ]	'science'	
Persian	Early New Persian, Early Judeo-Persian	گذشتن / guḏaštan	[gu.ðaʃˈtan]	'to pass'	Called ḏāl-i mu'ajjam. A postvocalic pronunciation of native /d/, either considered phonemic or phonetic. See Persian phonology
Portuguese	European	nada	[ˈn̪äðɐ]	'nothing'	Northern and central dialects. Allophone of /d/, mainly after an oral vowel. See Portuguese phonology
Sardinian		nidu	[ˈniðu]	'nest'	Allophone of lenis /d/, may also be realized closer to an approximant. See Sardinian phonology
Scottish Gaelic	Lewis	Màiri	[ˈmaːðʲi]	'Mary'	Slightly palatalized. Common Hebridean realisation of /ɾʲ/, standard or even phonemic in Lewis and also common in Harris; otherwise realized as [ɹ̠ʲ] in Harris, Uist and Barra, [ɾʲ] in Skye, as [ʒ] in southern Barra, or as [j] in Tiree.
Shughni		δud	[ðʊd]	'smoke, fumes'	See Shughni phonology
Sioux	Lakota	záptaŋ	[ˈðaptã]	'five'	Sometimes with [z]
Swahili		dhambi	[ðɑmbi]	'sin'	Mostly occurs in Arabic loanwords originally containing this sound.
Swedish	Central Standard	bräda	[ˈbə̆ɾɛ̂ːðɐ̞h]	'a board (object)'	Allophone of lenis /d/ in casual speech, may be realized closer to an approximant. See Swedish phonology
Syriac	Western Neo-Aramaic	ܐܚܕ	[aħːeð]	'to take'	
Tanacross		dhet	[ðet]	'liver'	
Turkmen		ýyldyz	[jɯldɯð]	'star'	Realization of the /z/ phoneme
Tutchone	Northern	edhó	[eðǒ]	'hide'	
Tutchone	Southern	adhǜ	[aðɨ̂]	'hide'	
Venetian		mezorno	[meˈðorno]	'midday'	
Welsh		bardd	[barð]	'bard'	See Welsh phonology
Zapotec	Tilquiapan				Allophone of /d/

=== Voiced dental approximant ===
The following list includes languages with variable pronunciations.

Language		Word	IPA	Meaning	Notes
Assyrian		ܘܪܕܐ (werda)	[wεrð̞a]	'flower'	Common in the Tyari, Barwari, and Western dialects. Corresponds to [d] in other varieties.
Asturian		padre	[ˈpäð̞ɾe]	'father'	Allophone of /d/. Fricative or approximant. See Asturian phonology
Basque		adar	[að̞ar]	'horn'	Allophone of /d/
Catalan		cada	[ˈkäð̞ə]	'each'	Allophone of /d/. Fricative or approximant. See Catalan phonology
Extremaduran		redi	[ˈreð̞ɪ]	'net'	Allophone of /d/. Usually elided in some cases. Fricative or approximant
Galician		lado	[ˈläð̞ʊ]	'side'	Allophone of /d/. Fricative or approximant. See Galician phonology
Kagayanen		kalag	[kað̞aɡ]	'spirit'	
Luri	Haftlang Bakhtiari around Masjed Soleyman	گده (gade)	[ɡað̞e]	'stomach'	Allophone of /d/ after vowels and also word-finally after glides (/h/, /j/, /ʋ/).
Occitan	Gascon	que divi	[ke ˈð̞iwi]	'what I should'	Allophone of /d/. See Occitan phonology
Spanish	Most dialects	dedo	[ˈd̪e̞ð̞o̞]	'finger'	Allophone of /d/, ranges from close fricative to approximant. See Spanish phonology

1. The Danish phoneme typically transcribed as /ð/ is actually an alveolar approximant.

== See also ==
- Voiceless dental fricative
- Voiced alveolar non-sibilant fricative
- Sibilant consonant § Possible combinations
- Index of phonetics articles

== Notes ==
Place →	Labial					Coronal										Dorsal					Laryngeal			
Manner ↓	Bilabial		Labiodental		Linguolabial		Dental		Alveolar		Postalveolar		Retroflex		(Alveolo-)palatal		Velar		Uvular		Pharyngeal/epiglottal		Glottal	
Nasal	m̥	m	ɱ̊	ɱ		n̼	n̪̊	n̪	n̥	n	n̠̊	n̠	ɳ̊	ɳ	ɲ̊	ɲ	ŋ̊	ŋ	ɴ̥	ɴ				
Plosive	p	b	p̪	b̪	t̼	d̼	t̪	d̪	t	d			ʈ	ɖ	c	ɟ	k	ɡ	q	ɢ	ʡ		ʔ	
Sibilant affricate							ts̪	dz̪	ts	dz	tʃ	dʒ	tʂ	dʐ	tɕ	dʑ								
Non-sibilant affricate	pɸ	bβ	p̪f	b̪v			tθ	dð	tɹ̝̊	dɹ̝	t̠ɹ̝̊	d̠ɹ̝			cç	ɟʝ	kx	ɡɣ	qχ	ɢʁ	ʡʜ	ʡʢ	ʔh	
Sibilant fricative							s̪	z̪	s	z	ʃ	ʒ	ʂ	ʐ	ɕ	ʑ								
Non-sibilant fricative	ɸ	β	f	v	θ̼	ð̼	θ	ð	θ̠	ð̠	ɹ̝̠̊	ɹ̠᷵	ɻ̥᷵	ɻ᷵	ç	ʝ	x	ɣ	χ	ʁ	ħ	ʕ	h	ɦ
Approximant		β̞		ʋ				ð̞		ɹ		ɹ̠		ɻ		j		ɰ						˷
Tap/flap		ⱱ̟		ⱱ					ɾ̥	ɾ			ɽ̊	ɽ						ɢ̆		ʡ̆		
Trill	ʙ̥	ʙ							r̥	r		r̠	ɽ̊r̥	ɽr					ʀ̥	ʀ	ʜ	ʢ		
Lateral affricate									tɬ	dɮ			tꞎ	d𝼅	c𝼆	ɟʎ̝	k𝼄	ɡʟ̝						
Lateral fricative							ɬ̪		ɬ	ɮ			ꞎ	𝼅	𝼆	ʎ̝	𝼄	ʟ̝						
Lateral approximant								l̪	l̥	l		l̠	ɭ̊	ɭ	ʎ̥	ʎ	ʟ̥	ʟ		ʟ̠				
Lateral tap/flap									ɺ̥	ɺ			𝼈̊	𝼈		ʎ̆		ʟ̆						

		BL	LD	D	A	PA	RF	P	V	U
Implosive	Voiced	ɓ			ɗ		ᶑ	ʄ	ɠ	ʛ
Implosive	Voiceless	ɓ̥			ɗ̥		ᶑ̊	ʄ̊	ɠ̊	ʛ̥
Ejective	Stop	pʼ			tʼ		ʈʼ	cʼ	kʼ	qʼ
Ejective	Affricate		p̪fʼ	tθʼ	tsʼ	tʃʼ	tʂʼ	tɕʼ	kxʼ	qχʼ
Ejective	Fricative	ɸʼ	fʼ	θʼ	sʼ	ʃʼ	ʂʼ	ɕʼ	xʼ	χʼ
Ejective	Lateral affricate				tɬʼ			c𝼆ʼ	k𝼄ʼ	q𝼄ʼ
Ejective	Lateral fricative				ɬʼ					
Click (top: velar; bottom: uvular)	Tenuis	kʘ qʘ		kǀ qǀ	kǃ qǃ		k𝼊 q𝼊	kǂ qǂ		
Click (top: velar; bottom: uvular)	Voiced	ɡʘ ɢʘ		ɡǀ ɢǀ	ɡǃ ɢǃ		ɡ𝼊 ɢ𝼊	ɡǂ ɢǂ		
Click (top: velar; bottom: uvular)	Nasal	ŋʘ ɴʘ		ŋǀ ɴǀ	ŋǃ ɴǃ		ŋ𝼊 ɴ𝼊	ŋǂ ɴǂ	ʞ	
Click (top: velar; bottom: uvular)	Tenuis lateral				kǁ qǁ					
Click (top: velar; bottom: uvular)	Voiced lateral				ɡǁ ɢǁ					
Click (top: velar; bottom: uvular)	Nasal lateral				ŋǁ ɴǁ					
