= Palatalization in the Romance languages =

Concept in linguistics

Palatalization in the Romance languages encompasses various historical sound changes which caused consonants to develop a palatal articulation or secondary articulation, as well as certain further developments such as affrication. (Note: In many Romance languages affricates like [t͡ʃ t͡s d͡z d͡ʒ] later turned to fricatives like [ʃ s θ z ʒ].) It resulted in the creation of several consonants that had not existed in Classical Latin, such as the Italian [t͡s d͡z ʃ t͡ʃ d͡ʒ ɲ ʎ].

Certain types of palatalization affected all Romance languages, and were in some cases discernible in Late Latin, while others affected only a subset of languages and are only known from later evidence. Palatalization was not a single event but rather occurred multiple times in the development of Romance, in different places and in different ways.

== Definition ==
Palatalization strictly speaking refers either to a change in a consonant's place of articulation, such as when the alveolar nasal [n] develops to a palatal nasal [ɲ], or to a change in secondary articulation, such as when [n] develops to [nʲ] (still alveolar but with the tongue body lifted towards the palate).

In Romance linguistics, palatalization is also loosely used to refer to certain sound-changes that are assumed to have followed from 'true' palatalization. For instance, the development from the Latin [d] in hordeum (Note: Latin words will simply be indicated with small capitals for convenience. In cases where a cited source modifies their spelling, for example by omitting final m, they have been respelt here in the standard way. Vowel length is only specified where relevant.) to the Italian [d͡z] in orzo is referred to as 'palatalization', despite the resulting [d͡z] not being a palatal sound, because intermediate stages like *[dʲ], *[d͡zʲ] may be inferred.

== /Cj/ ==
The Latin front vowels /e i/ developed into a palatal approximant [j] when they were unstressed and followed by another vowel. This occurred regularly by Late Latin. The resulting [j] could then palatalize a preceding consonant. Whether this is best modelled as allophonic (/Cj/ [Cʲ]) or phonemic (/Cʲ/) is a matter of scholarly disagreement. This article uses the representation /Cj/.

In addition to palatalization, /j/ often geminated preceding consonants. For example filius and vinea can be reconstructed as developing the pronunciations [ˈfiːl.ljus] and [ˈwiːn.nja], which may have been a means of resolving the "unnatural" syllabifications [l.j] and [n.j]. In any case every /Cj/ sequence other than /sj/ shows some evidence of lengthening in Romance.

Palatalization of /Cj/ may have occurred in more than one wave. This has been argued on the grounds that in Western Romance the vowels /ɛ ɔ/ were not affected by metaphony if followed by original /tj kj/ but were affected if followed by other /Cj/ sequences. The implication is that original /tj kj/ had lost their palatal element by the time metaphony began to operate. Compare French outcomes like force < *[ˈfɔrtsa] < fortia (without metaphony) versus hui < *[ˈu̯oje] < hodie (with metaphony).

Palatalization of /Cj/ may have occurred later (and independently) in Balkan Romance than elsewhere. This has been argued on the grounds that languages like Romanian show the same outcomes for consonants followed by primary /j/ (from Late Latin), secondary /j/ (from later diphthongization), and the vowel /i/. Compare Romanian outcomes like puţ < puteum, ţară < *[ˈtjɛrra] < terram, and subţire < subtilem.

=== /tj kj/ ===
==== Early evidence ====
Evidence of the palatalization of /tj kj/ appears as early as the 2nd–3rd centuries AD in the form of spelling mistakes interchanging ⟨ti⟩ and ⟨ci⟩ before a following vowel, as in ⟨tribunitiae⟩ for tribuniciae. This is assumed to reflect the development of /k/ in this environment to [c].

The affrication of /tj/ can also be dated to the 2nd–3rd centuries AD. The evidence includes inscriptional use of ⟨tsi⟩ or ⟨tz⟩ in place of ⟨ti⟩ and commentary by grammarians from the late 4th century onwards about the pronunciation of words spelled with ⟨ti⟩ + vowel. The latter include Consentius (5th century), Servius, Pompeius (5th–6th century), Papirius (probably the same as Papirianus, ca. late 4th to early 6th century), and Isidore (7th century).

The affrication of /kj/ seems to have occurred at a later date than that of /tj/, possibly as late as the 6th–7th centuries AD. Non-affricated reflexes of /kj/ are found in some borrowings into West Germanic, for instance the Old High German echol and Old Saxon ekil 'steel' < aciarium, Middle High German bracke 'wooden beam' < brachium, and Old Saxon wikkia 'vetch' < viciam. Borrowings into Albanian show a palatal stop /c/ (spelt ⟨q⟩) as the outcome of both Latin /kj/ and /k/ before front vowels, whereas /tj/ yields Albanian /s/ or sometimes /t͡s/. Examples include faqe 'cheek' < faciem 'face'; kumerq 'toll, duty' < commercium 'trade'; pus 'well, fountain' < puteum 'well'; and mars 'March' < martium 'March'. Evidence for affrication of /kj/ includes the spelling ⟨judigsium⟩ for iudicium, which can be dated to the sixth century. Procopius, writing in Greek circa 553-555, uses the spellings Μουτζιανικάστελλον (Moutzianikástellon) for muciani castellum and Λούτζολο (Loútzolo) for luciolum (De Aedificiis 4.4.3), which suggests that Latin /kj/ had developed to an affricate. On the other hand he writes ⟨κ⟩ for Latin c before a front vowel, as in Μαρκελλιανά (Markellianá) for marcelliana, which suggests that at the time /k/ was not affricated in that context.

==== Romance outcomes ====
All Romance languages reflect the palatalization of Latin /tj kj/, which can be reconstructed as developing into affricates and later, in some languages, into fricatives.

In Tuscan, Corsican, and some Rhaeto-Romance languages, the outcomes of /tj/ are more anterior (alveolar) affricates than the outcomes of /kj/, whereas in other varieties of Romance, the outcomes of /tj kj/ share the same place of articulation.

In Romanian, /tj kj/ yield [t͡s] and sometimes [t͡ʃ]. According to one view, the regular outcome of /tj kj/ was [t͡s] before [a] or word-final [o u], as in înălța, județ < *inaltiare, iudicium; and [t͡ʃ] before non-final [o u], as in măciucă, urcior < matteuca, urceolus.

In Sardinia and Southern Italy the original outcome of /tj kj/ can be reconstructed as [t͡s] or [tt͡s].

There are competing explanations for the Western Romance outcome [t͡s] for /kj/ (and likewise for /k/ before front vowels). One is that the initial result was [t͡ʃ] (or [tt͡ʃ]) which later depalatalized to [t͡s]. (That this process necessarily implies a [t͡ʃ] stage is disputed.) Another is that the /k/ in /kj/ palatalized to [c] and then the sequence was reidentified as /tj/, which then affricated to [t͡s].

===== Intervocalic =====
In Western Romance, intervocalic /kj/ typically has a voiceless outcome (which implies that it was initially geminated (Note: Compare the Western Romance outcomes of intervocalic Latin /pp tt kk/, which remain voiceless, and those of intervocalic /p t k/, which underwent voicing.)) whereas intervocalic /tj/ can have a voiced outcome. This contrast in voicing is assumed to result from the earlier palatalization of /tj/ compared to /kj/. However, intervocalic /tj/ can alternatively show a voiceless outcome identical to that of /ttj/ or /kj/. There are several proposed explanations for the divergent outcomes of intervocalic /tj/ in Western Romance languages. One is that /tj/ geminated to /ttj/ only in certain words, with Catalan plaça for example reflecting *plattea < plateam. Another is that the voiceless outcomes resulted from early confusion between /tj/ and /kj/, perhaps at a time when [tʲ] or [c] was a potential realization of either sequence.

The voiced outcome normally associated with /tj/ is sometimes found in words that originally had intervocalic /kj/, such as Portuguese juízo < judicium and Galiza < Gallaeciam.

Some outcomes of intervocalic /tj kj/
| Branch | Language | tj | kj |
|---|---|---|---|
| Sardinian | Campidanese~Central Sardinian~Logudorese | t͡ːs~θː~tː | |
| Western Romance | West/North Friulian | t͡ʃ | |
| Western Romance | East Friulian | s | |
| Western Romance | Fassan | t͡s | t͡ʃ |
| Western Romance | Comelican | ð/θ | θ |
| Western Romance | Livinallonghese | t͡s | t͡ʃ |
| Western Romance | Surselvan, Sutselvan, Surmiran, Engadinian | t͡s | t͡ʃ |
| Western Romance | Venetian | (t)s~θ | (t)s~θ |
| Western Romance | Ligurian | s (t͡s) | |
| Western Romance | Lombard | s | s/ʃ |
| Western Romance | Picard | ʃ | |
| Western Romance | French | jz | s |
| Western Romance | Franco-Provençal | z (ʒ, θ) | s (ʃ, θ) |
| Western Romance | Auvergnat, Occitan | z | s |
| Western Romance | Catalan | z/ð (Note: Subsequently changed further: in modern Catalan, Latin intervocalic -tj- and Latin -c- followed by e or i were ultimately lost between vowels (e.g. rationem > raó; vecinum > veí) and vocalized to /w/ word-finally or before a consonant (e.g. palatium > palau, puteum > pou, pretium > preu; decem > deu, vicem > veu). This is identical to the outcome of Latin intervocalic -d-.) | s |
| Western Romance | Spanish | θ (Note: In most of European Spanish; Latin America instead has /s/.) | |
| Western Romance | Portuguese | z | s |
| Others | Romanian | t͡s (t͡ʃ) | |
| Others | Vegliote | s | |
| Others | Calabrese | t͡ːs | |
| Others | Tuscan and Corsican | t͡ːs | t͡ːʃ |

===== Postconsonantal =====
When preceded by a consonant, /tj/ remained voiceless in Western Romance. The development of /stj/ to [ʃʃ] in Tuscan likely proceeded via an intermediate stage of *[ʃt͡ʃ].

| Language | stj, skj | ptj, ktj, ttj, kkj | (n, r, l) + tj, kj |
|---|---|---|---|
| Tuscan | ʃː | (t͡ːs, t͡ːʃ) | (t͡s, t͡ʃ) |
| French | js | s | s |
| Old Spanish | t͡s | t͡s | t͡s |

=== /dj ɡj/ ===
Intervocalically, the sequences /dj ɡj/ could both merge with /j/ in an early type of lenition. (Note: Note that between vowels, Latin /j/ was in fact normally a geminate consonant [jj], as in maius [ˈmajjus], although many of the Romance outcomes imply development of intervocalic /j/ into a single consonant.) Among the first examples of this is the spelling ⟨aiutor⟩ for adiutor in the graffiti of Pompeii. /-dj-/ could either participate in this merger or survive long enough to develop in parallel with /tj/.

The outcomes in many Romance languages are often explained by reconstructing a stage where /dj ɡj/ in general (as well as /ɡ/ before a front vowel) merged with /j/ which then underwent fortition (especially at the start of a word or morpheme), often yielding an affricate like [d͡ʒ]. Some inscriptions show interchange between the spellings ⟨i z zi di⟩, as in ⟨ziaconus⟩ for diaconus 'deacon' or ⟨oze⟩ for hodie 'today'.

Evidence for the fortition of original /j/ includes ⟨ZERAX⟩ for Hierax and ⟨ZANVARIO⟩ for Ianuario, found in inscriptions from the third century AD. Initial /j/ appears to have remained a palatal glide in Southern Italian, some dialects of Sardinian, and (in some contexts) Castilian, which suggests that its fortition to an affricate or fricative may not been complete in Late Latin or Proto-Romance. However, it is possible that Southern Italian and Castilian did not conserve the original value of Latin /j-/ but rather redeveloped the glide via later lenition (note that intervocalic /ɡj/ shows the same outcome).

Some outcomes of /dj ɡj/ and /j/:

- Southern Italian dialects show [j] for all three.
- Spanish shows a split outcome for Latin word-initial /j/. Before o u it usually became j, whereas before a e, it usually became y (but was lost in unstressed syllables). (Note: In Old Spanish, j was a sibilant [d͡ʒ~ʒ] while y was a voiced non-sibilant palatal. However, in modern Spanish, the phonetic realization of y is highly variable: it can be an affricate [ɟ͡ʝ], especially in postpausal position, or can be generally pronounced as a sibilant in some accents.) Nearby Gascon is similar. Between vowels, /dj ɡj j/ all merged; the original outcome was likely a geminate palatal consonant [ʝʝ], which was then simplified along with other geminates and became the consonant spelled ⟨y⟩ in modern Spanish. This palatal consonant was lost after a front vowel in Old Spanish, as in sedeam > sea, corrigiam > correa, and peiorem > peor. After a consonant, /dj/ developed into the Old Spanish voiceless affricate [t͡s], as in hordeolum > orçuelo or verecundiam > vergüença (but also vergüeña).
- In Romanian, /dj/ regularly became [z] (from earlier *[d͡z]), as in miez 'kernel' < medium. This is distinct from the outcomes of medial /gj/ and /(j)j/.
- In Standard Italian, /j/ and /ɡj/ yield [d͡ʒ] and /dj/ yields either [d͡ʒ] or [d͡z]. (Between vowels, the outcomes are geminates.) The outcome of /dj/ is always [d͡ʒ] at the start of a word and always [d͡z] after a consonant (with the exception of [verˈɡoɲɲa] < verecundiam 'shame'). Further examples include diurnum > giorno [ˈd͡ʒorno] and hordeum > orzo [ˈɔrd͡zo]. Between vowels, /dj/ usually results in [dd͡ʒ] but sometimes also [dd͡z]. These outcomes seem consistent with an original merger of /j/, /ɡj/ and (initial or intervocalic) /dj/ as [j], followed by fortition of [j] to [d͡ʒ]. The reason for the variation in outcomes of /dj/ is unclear.
- In Sardinian, /dj/ seems to have merged with /j/ in all contexts.
- In French, the outcomes of /dj ɡj/ appear consistent with an early merger into [j] in all positions followed by fortition of [j] word-initially or after /r/, yielding modern French [ʒ]. Examples include diurnum > jour [ʒuʀ] and hordeum > orge [ɔʀʒ]. (The outcome of /rdj rɡj/ is different from the usual outcome of original /rj/ in French.) The sequence /ndj/ developed to [ɲ] (also the usual outcome of /nj/), as in burgundiam > Bourgogne and verecundiam > vergogne.

Some outcomes of Latin /dj ɡj/ and /j/
| Branch | Language | intervocalic | | | word-initial | |
| Branch | Language | ɡj | j | dj | dj | j |
|---|---|---|---|---|---|---|
| Sardinian | Campidanese | ∅ | | | d͡ʒ | |
| Sardinian | Central Sardinian | ∅ | j | | | |
| Sardinian | Logudorese | ∅ | j | | j/d͡ʒ/d͡z | |
| Western Romance | West/North Friulian | j/∅ | | j/z | ɟ/j/d͡ʒ | j/(d)ʒ/d͡z |
| Western Romance | East Friulian | j/∅ | | j/z | | j/ʒ/z |
| Western Romance | Fassan | j/∅ | ʒ | z | ʒ | |
| Western Romance | Comelican | j | d/ð | | | |
| Western Romance | Livinallonghese | j | | j/zʲ | d͡ʒ | ʒ |
| Western Romance | Surselvan | ɟ | ɟ/j | d͡z | ɟ | |
| Western Romance | Sutselvan | ɟ(ʒ) | | z | ɟ | ɟ/ʒ |
| Western Romance | Surmiran | d͡z | | | | |
| Western Romance | Engadinian | ɟ/j | | d͡z | ɟ/j | |
| Western Romance | Venetian | (d)z~ð(~d) | | (d)z~ð(~d) | d͡ʒ/z | j/(d)z~ð(~d) |
| Western Romance | Ligurian | d͡z | z(d͡z) | d͡z | d͡ʒ | z |
| Western Romance | Lombard | z | | ʒ/z | z | (d)ʒ |
| Western Romance | Picard | j | | | ʒ | |
| Western Romance | French | j | | | ʒ | |
| Western Romance | Franco-Provençal | j | | j/d͡z | d͡z | |
| Western Romance | Auvergnat | d͡z | | | | |
| Western Romance | Occitan | ʒ | | | | |
| Western Romance | Catalan | (d)ʒ | | | | |
| Western Romance | Spanish | j/∅ | | | j | j/x |
| Western Romance | Portuguese | ʒ | | | | |
| Others | Romanian | j/∅ | j | z | ʒ | |
| Others | Vegliote | d͡z | j/∅ | d͡z | | |
| Others | Calabrese | j | | | | |
| Others | Tuscan | d͡ːʒ | | d͡ːʒ, d͡ːz | d͡ʒ | |
| Others | Corsican | ɟ | ɟ/j | ɟ/d͡ːz | ɟ | ɟ/d͡ʒ |

=== /nj/ ===
In Central Italian, Southern Italian, and Western Romance languages, Latin /nj/ became [ɲ]. In Central and Southern Italian, this occurs as a geminate [ɲɲ] between vowels. A geminate can be inferred for early Western Romance as well based on the evolution of preceding vowels.

In French, a few words show an alternative outcome with the fricative [ʒ], corresponding to an original [d͡ʒ] in Old French (and identical to the regular outcome of /mj/). Examples include lineum 'linen' > linge [lɛ̃ʒ], extraneum > étrange 'strange', and laneum > lange. This outcome may represent cases where /j/ did not palatalize the preceding /n/ but was strengthened into an affricate instead; alternatively, it has been explained as resulting from the affrication of a palatalized nasal (via a sequence of changes such as [nj] > [nʲ͜dʲ] > [nd͡ʒ]). It has also been suggested that the words in question are 'learned', that is, borrowed from Latin early and subjected to the vernacular sound-changes /i e/ > [j] and [j] > [d͡ʒ]. As for the sequence /mnj/, it regularly developed to [◌̃ʒ], again like /mj/; compare the regular development of /mn/ to [mm] in words like somniculum > sommeil.

In Balkan Romance /nj/ became [ɲ], which is retained in Aromanian and the Banat dialect of Romanian. In Romanian, [ɲ] was denasalized to [j], and then often deleted, as in calcaneum, vineam > călcâi, vie 'heel', 'vineyard'. The Latin geminate -nn- seems to have developed likewise to [ɲ] before [i] (the only clear example is anni > Old Romanian ai, later replaced by the analogical plural ani), whereas originally singleton -n- remained before [i] (as in venire > veni, cani > câini), which Barbato interprets as a sign that /nj/ was previously geminated (although not palatalized until the original length contrast between -nn- and -n- had been replaced with a fortis-lenis contrast). Based on the development of preceding vowels, Sampson 1995 reconstructs an initial stage with a heterosyllabic nasal + glide sequence [ɲ.j] (containing a coda nasal archiphoneme /N/) at the point where vowel nasalization and raising occurred in early Romanian.

In Sardinian, original /nj/ developed into a cluster of a nasal and voiced affricate, as in vineam > Nuorese [ˈbind͡za], Campidanese [ˈbind͡ʒa], Logudorese [ˈbind͡za]. A similar outcome is found in some southern varieties of Corsican, as in vineam > [ˈvinɟa]. As in French, the nasal + affricate clusters in Sardinian have been interpreted either as the result of reinforcement of syllable-initial /j/ in /nj/ without palatalization of the nasal or as the result of a palatalization of /nj/ followed by reinforcement of the resulting palatalized consonant.

=== /lj/ ===
The sequence /lj/ yielded the palatal lateral [ʎ] throughout Western Romance as well as in Southern and Central Italy. Like [ɲ], the resulting [ʎ] is geminated in Central and Southern Italian, and was in Western Romance prior to the general simplification of geminates in most languages from that branch. In many cases [ʎ] subsequently delateralized to [j].

In Iberia, [ʎ] remains in Aragonese and Portuguese but developed to [j] in Asturian and [ʒ] in Old Spanish. (Note: Old Spanish [ʒ] seems most likely to have developed from an older *[j], although a direct development from [ʎ] has also been suggested. The development to a sound like [ʒ] is first attested in tenth-century Castilian documents with forms like ⟨mortagga taggare magguelo⟩ for mortalia taleare malleolus. Old Spanish [ʒ] went on to merge with [ʃ] by the late 16th century, which was then retracted to the Modern Spanish [x] by about the middle of the 17th century.) In Catalan the outcomes are regionally split: most eastern and all Balearic dialects have [j], while the remaining dialects (including that of Barcelona) have [ʎ]. In dialects of central and eastern Iberia that retained [ʎ], this consonant merged with a later [ʎ] that developed from Latin /ll/; this can be seen in the aforementioned Catalan dialects as well as Navarro-Aragonese and some western varieties of Leonese.

In Balkan Romance /lj/ yielded *[ʎ] (apparently a geminate at first). In Romanian this was delateralized to [j], as in folia > *[ˈfɔʎa] > foaie 'leaf'. The stage [ʎ] survives in the Banat dialect as well as Aromanian.

In some Sardinian varieties, the ultimate outcome of /lj/ is a geminate voiced affricate, as in folia > Logudorese [ˈfɔdd͡za] or Campidanese [ˈfɔdd͡ʒa]. These can be interpreted as resulting either from palatalization of [l] followed by affrication of the resulting palatal lateral or from fortition of a syllable-initial /j/ (as after /n/) followed by assimilation of the preceding /l/, as in *[ˈfɔl.ja] > *[ˈfɔld͡za] > [ˈfɔdd͡za]. The dialect of Cagliari has [ll], which probably developed via depalatalization of former [ʎʎ].

=== /rj/ ===
In Western Romance, /rj/ universally developed via [rʲ] to [i̯r] (which can also be written [jr] and interpreted as a case of metathesis). French displays this development, as in aire < aream and cuir < corium, as well as an alternative outcome /ʀʒ/, as in cereum > cierge and burrionem > bourgeon.

Italo-Romance languages show various outcomes including loss of the /r/, loss of the /j/, and gemination to /rr/.

In Balkan Romance, [rʲ] seems to have developed variously into [rj], [r], and [j]. Examples of variable reflexes in Romanian are area > arie 'farmyard', -arius > -ar, and pareo > pai 'I appear (dialectal)'.

/rj/ survives as a consonant cluster in Sardinian, as in corium 'leather' > Nuorese [ˈkorju], Logudorese [ˈkord͡zu], and Campidanese [ˈkord͡ʒu]; and also some varieties of southern Corsican, as in aream > [ˈarɟa].

=== /sj/ ===
Intervocalic /sj/ (Note: Including cases where /s/ reflects an original /ns/, which reduced to /s/ early on in Latin.) shows the following outcomes:

- Portuguese has [jʒ], as in caseum 'cheese' > [ˈkejʒu] or basium > beijo 'kiss'.
- In Spanish the outcome can be traced back to an original [jz]. The [j] combined with a preceding vowel, forming diphthongs that were later modified, and the [z] eventually devoiced to [s]. Examples of this development are queso 'cheese' < *[ˈkejzo] < *[ˈkajzo] < caseum and beso 'kiss' < *[ˈbejzo] < *[ˈbajzo] < basium.
- In French, /sj/ also developed to [jz], as in mansionem > maison 'house', probably via the intermediate stage of a palatalized sibilant such as [zʲ]. The [j] combined with a preceding vowel, forming various diphthongs that were later modified.
- In Tuscan, intervocalic /sj/ developed at first to /ʃ/ or sometimes /ʒ/; these eventually merged with the phonemes /t͡ʃ d͡ʒ/ when the latter developed the allophones [ʃ ʒ] in intervocalic position. (Note: In Old Tuscan texts, intervocalic /ʃ ʒ/, still phonemically distinct from /t͡ʃ d͡ʒ/, were given spellings like ⟨sc(i)⟩ and ⟨sg(i)⟩ respectively. After the lenition of intervocalic affricates (which seems to be attested in spelling confusions since the second half of the 13th century for /d͡ʒ/, and since the early 15th century for /t͡ʃ/), the usual spellings of intervocalic [ʃ ʒ] (now all phonemically /t͡ʃ d͡ʒ/) in Tuscan texts came to be ⟨c(i)⟩ and ⟨g(i)⟩, as in ⟨bacio⟩ and ⟨pertugio⟩.) Standard Italian today has a uniform pronunciation of /t͡ʃ d͡ʒ/ as [t͡ʃ d͡ʒ] (with no intervocalic [ʃ ʒ]), likely the result of spelling-pronunciation by speakers outside of Tuscany.
- In Romanian /sj/ became [ʃ], as in caseum > caș 'cheese'.
- In Sardinia and the south of Italy, /sj/ developed to /s/ (voiced in some areas to phonetic [z]). Examples of this outcome are Nuorese Sardinian [ˈkazu] and Neapolitan caso 'cheese' < caseum.

Geminate /ssj/ could develop into [ʃʃ], as in Old Florentine grascia < *crassiam; this outcome is also found in some varieties that show a non-palatal outcome for intervocalic /sj/, as in the Neapolitan avasciare 'to lower' < *bassiare. Per Recasens, such cases of asymmetrical development may be the result of phonetic factors that make palatalization less favored for voiced compared to voiceless consonants. The sequence /rsj/ could have the same outcome, as in Tuscan [roveʃˈʃaːre] < *reversiare; compare the development of rs to [ss] in dorsum > Italian dosso.

=== Labial + /j/ ===
The palatalization of labials is cross-linguistically rare and a variety of strategies for avoiding it are attested such as preservation of the cluster [Cj], gemination of the consonant before [j], metathesis of [j], and change of [j] to a palatal consonant. All of these outcomes are found in Romance.

Intervocalic -b- and -v- merged as [β] in 'Vulgar Latin'. When this sound was followed by [j], it was sometimes lost or delabialized early on, causing [βj] to yield the same outcome as /j/ (and /dj ɡj/) in some words. This can be seen in French ai from habeo and dois from debeo, or Spanish haya from habeam and (archaic) foya from foveam. In a larger set of words, [βj] was initially retained but underwent diverse developments in different Romance languages.

==== Gemination ====
In Italian, intervocalic [pj βj mj] show gemination of the labial consonant, resulting in [ppj bbj mmj]. Examples include sapiat > [ˈsappja], rabiam > rabbia [ˈrabbja], habeat > abbia, caveam > gabbia, vindemiam > vendemmia.

Western Romance shows inconsistent application of gemination in intervocalic labial + /j/ clusters; some forms such as Spanish jibia 'cuttlefish' < sepiam show the effects of intervocalic lenition on the labial consonant, implying a lack of gemination. (Penny considers it likely that the form jibia is Mozarabic in origin rather than a native Castilian development.)

==== Metathesis ====
Portuguese exhibits what is traditionally described as 'metathesis' of labial + /j/ sequences: that is, the [j] appears to have been moved before the labial consonant. Examples include apium > aipo 'celery', rabiam > raiva 'anger, rage', rubeum > ruivo 'red-haired', and novium > noivo 'fiancé'. It has been argued that the labial consonant and palatal glide did not switch positions in a single abrupt step, but underwent the following series of sound changes:

1. First, labial + /j/ sequences coalesced into palatalized labial consonants [mʲ pʲ bʲ vʲ]. Spellings such as ⟨mh vh bh⟩ may attest to the original development of palatalized consonants in this context (compare the still-current use in Portuguese of ⟨nh lh⟩ as spellings for /ɲ ʎ/).
2. Next, an epenthetic glide [j] developed between a vowel and a following palatalized labial consonant.
3. Finally, palatalized labial consonants were depalatalized, becoming plain labials preceded by a (now phonemically distinct) palatal glide.

It appears that these changes occurred between Old and Medieval Portuguese, at a later date than the palatalization and 'metathesis' of /sj/, /zj/ and /rj/ in Hispano-Romance: metathesis of /s z r/ + /j/ is found regularly in both Spanish and Portuguese, and was followed by a shift from [aj] to [ej] that can be seen in Portuguese queijo, eira, queixar, whereas metathesis of labial + /j/ occurs regularly in Portuguese but not in Spanish, and affected Portuguese words show unshifted /aj/. The Portuguese metathesis of labial + /j/ sequences occurred late enough to affect some cases of secondary [j] that developed after lenition of a following intervocalic consonant (as in limpidum > *[ˈlim.pjo] > limpho 'clean' and comedo > *[ˈko.mjo] > coimo 'I eat'). In cases where a palatalized consonant came after another consonant or after the vowel /i/ (e.g. modern Portuguese limpo 'clean'), the original [j] may be attested only indirectly in the modern language by its effect of raising a preceding vowel (metaphony).

In Spanish, Latin labial + [j] sequences did not systematically undergo metathesis; the general outcome is simply a labial consonant followed by [j]. (Note: In Spanish phonology, the palatal semivowel [j] is usually analyzed in this context as a non-syllabic allophone of the vowel /i/.) This is shown by the following examples: apium > apio 'celery', rabiam > rabia 'anger, rage'; rubeum > rubio 'blond', novium > novio 'boyfriend'. However, metathesis of original [pj] to [jp] is seen in forms of two Spanish verbs, saber 'to know' and caber 'to fit': the effects of this metathesis are seen in forms like sepa (< sapiat) and quepo (< capio). Wireback argues that in Spanish, unlike in Portuguese, there was an abrupt inversion from /pj/ to /jp/ in these verb forms as a result of morphological analogy with vowel + /j/ sequences found in the inflectional paradigms of other verbs. (Note: These two verbs also show metathesis of /pw/ to /wp/ in their preterite stems. For example, saber in Old Spanish had the preterite form sope 'I knew' (< *[ˈsawpi] < *[ˈsapwi] < sapui) (/o/ here was later replaced analogically by /u/, yielding modern Spanish supe). Even though the cognate Portuguese verbs saber and caber also show metathesis of labial + /j/ and labial + /w/ sequences (in forms such as saiba, caibo, soube, coube), it is thought that metathesis occurred in Spanish and Portuguese at different times, rather than occurring once in their immediate common ancestor.)

Proto-Romanian shows the development of a diphthongal offglide after a stressed vowel followed by an original sequence of labial consonant + palatal glide, as illustrated by *scupio > Romanian scuip, habeat > aibă, and diffamiam > defaimă. The glide remained after an unstressed syllable, as in appropriare > apropia.

==== Glide strengthening ====
In various Romance languages, original labial + /j/ sequences gave rise to palatal obstruents (sometimes accompanied or followed by loss of the labial articulation). Palatal obstruents may have developed in this context by strengthening of the palatal glide component of palatalized labial consonants.

- Some Balkan Romance languages, after the split of Proto-Romanian, show the development of pronunciations like [(p)kʲ~(p)tʲ~(p)t͡ʃ], [(b)ɡʲ~(b)dʲ~(b)d͡ʒ], and [mnʲ~nʲ] from labial consonants followed by /j/ or /i/, as in /koˈpil/ [kopˈkʲil] 'child'. These seem to have arisen from palatalized labials such as [pʲ bʲ mʲ] by 'consonantification' of the offglide.
- Old Provençal shows [ˈrobd͡ʒe] < rubeum and [ˈsapt͡ʃa] < sapiat, and the Lombard dialect of Borno shows [ˈbd͡ʒulk] < *bjulk 'yokel'.
- Old French shows [t͡ʃ] as the usual outcome of /pj/; [d͡ʒ] as the outcome of /bj βj/; and [nd͡ʒ] as the outcome of /mj mbj mnj/. These correspond to modern French [ʃ], [ʒ], and [◌̃ʒ] respectively. The following examples demonstrate these outcomes: sepiam 'cuttlefish' > seiche, sapiam > sache, rubeum 'red' > rouge, caveam > cage, salviam > sauge, servientem > sergent, simium 'monkey' > singe, cambiare > changer, somnium > songe. The Old French pronunciations are likely derived from simplification of labial-affricate sequences such as [pt͡ʃ bd͡ʒ md͡ʒ] or [vd͡ʒ]. (Forms with a retained labial consonant, such as apje and salvje, are attested in Hebrew–Old French glosses.) These may have developed from palatalized labial consonants by means of offglide consonantization (as in Balkan Romance); e.g. [pʲ] > [pt͡ʃ] > [t͡ʃ]. A competing explanation of the French outcomes is that Latin /pj bj mj/ remained clusters, and then the postconsonantal /j/ underwent fortition (with the resulting affricate being assimilated in voice to the preceding consonant).
- In Neapolitan (in southern Italy), /pj/ and /bj/ ultimately became geminate affricates [tt͡ʃ dd͡ʒ] as in sepiam > seccia and rabiam > arraggia 'rage'. These may have developed from [pt͡ʃ bd͡ʒ] sequences; an alternative explanation is that geminated palatalized labials [ppʲ bbʲ] were reinterpreted as palatal consonants due to acoustic similarity.

== /k ɡ/ + front vowel ==
/k ɡ/ were palatalized before /i e ɛ/ in all of Romance except certain varieties of Sardinian and Dalmatian. Palatalization in this context can be dated to about the fifth century AD, although it is possible that it occurred independently and at a later date in eastern Romance compared to western Romance. In Romanian, unlike most Romance languages, palatalization occurred after the loss of the [w] in sequences of [kw] or [ɡw] + front vowel, hence the affricates in sânge, acel < sanguem, *eccum illum.

The Ragusan dialect of Dalmatian showed no palatalization of /k ɡ/ before any vowel. The Vegliote dialect of Dalmatian showed palatalization of /k/ to [t͡ʃ] before /i/, but this is argued to be a separate internal innovation rather than an inherited trait in common with other Romance varieties. It also occurred before the [j] of diphthongs, as in [munˈt͡ʃal] 'hill' < *[munˈkjel] < monticellum.

=== /ɡ/ ===
The palatalization of /ɡ/ before /i e ɛ/ may have begun earlier than that of /k/. Epigraphic evidence indicates that in the Latin of the Late Empire onwards, intervocalic /ɡ/ may have already been lost in some words where it occurred between non-back vowels, for example in viginti, frigidus, digitus or legit, sagitta. This may have begun as early as the first century BC.

In most Romance languages, the palatalization of /ɡ/ by a following front vowel resulted in the same outcome as that of /dj ɡj j/. Exceptions to this include Romanian and some Rhaeto-Romance varieties.

==== Postconsonantal ====
- /nɡ/ before a front vowel could evolve into a palatal nasal [ɲ(ɲ)] (merging with the outcome of /nj/) or into a nasal followed by an affricate or fricative, depending on the language or sometimes on the word. The regular outcome of nasal + [ɡ] + front vowel is [ɲɲ] across nearly all of southern Italy; in contrast, dialects of northern Italy show [nd͡z] or [nz], which probably developed from earlier [nd͡ʒ]. In Tuscany, both [ɲɲ] and [nd͡ʒ] are found. Their original distribution seems to have been based on geography, with [ɲɲ] in eastern Tuscany (and in Old Florentine) and [nd͡ʒ] in the west. However, modern Florentine has [nd͡ʒ], and Old Florentine shows a mixture of forms such as piange alongside piagne 'he cries' and spegnere alongside spengere 'to extinguish' < plangere, *expingere. The reason for the displacement of [ɲɲ] by [nd͡ʒ] in Florentine are unclear, but it may have been due to influence from northern Italian and from the regions of Tuscany where [nd͡ʒ] was the regular outcome. Standard Italian, like modern Florentine, generally has [nd͡ʒ], with the exception of spegnere. In Spanish, /nɡ/ + front vowel shows three possible outcomes: Old Spanish /nd͡z/ (modern /nθ/), as in gingivam > enzia > modern encía 'gum'; /ɲ/, as in ringere > reñir 'to scold'; and /n/, as in quingentos > quinientos. The development to [ɲ] seems to be typical in verbs.
- There are relatively few examples of the outcome of [lɡ] before a front vowel in Italian and Spanish. The sequence -lig- in the Latin verb forms colligit and *exeligit developed the same way as original [lj]. This has been cited as evidence that [lɡ] developed to [(ʎ)ʎ] before a front vowel, based on the assumption that -(l)lig- here underwent syncope to [lɡ]; however, it is possible that these outcomes instead reflect the aforementioned early loss of intervocalic /ɡ/ between non-back vowels, followed by a change of the prior vowel into a glide (yielding [lj]). (Note: In the case of Italian, Rohlfs (1966) cites cogliere < colligere and scegliere < *exeligere as evidence that a palatal lateral was the usual outcome in Tuscan of [lɡ] before a front vowel (words such as algere, emulgere, fulgere, indulgere are disregarded as non-inherited forms). Likewise, Maiden derives Italian [ˈkɔʎʎe] 'he plucks' and [ˈʃeʎʎe] 'he chooses' from *[ˈkɔlɡe] and *[ekˈselɡe]. On the other hand, Boyd-Bowman (1980) traces Italian cogliere 'collect' to colli(g)ere and views it as showing the same development as in allium > aglio. As for Spanish, although Hanssen (1913) derives coges from a syncopated form *colgis, Penny (2002) prefers the derivation colligis > *[ˈkɔllees] > *[ˈkɔlljes] > *[ˈkɔʎes] > coges 'you grasp', and Tuttle (1912) argues that coge does not descend from *colget, but instead harks back to a form like *colliet that developed by elision of intervocalic [ɡ].) Malkiel (1982) notes the scarcity of examples for the outcome of [lɡ] + front vowel in Old Spanish and considers there to only be a single indirect example of its outcome, the modern Asturian verb esmucir, tentatively assumed to descend from exmulgere via an intermediate stage *esmulzir.
- /rɡ/ before a front vowel usually yielded [rd͡z] (modern /ɾθ/) in Old Spanish, as in ARGĪ̆LLAM > arcilla "clay". Alternatively it could reduce to /r/; compare the eleventh-century spellings ⟨ariento⟩ for argentum ‘silver’ and ⟨burçes⟩ for burgense. In Tuscany the outcome is [rd͡ʒ], apart from (again) ariento, an early variant of argento. In southern Italy the outcome is [rj].

=== /k/ ===
The palatalization of /k/ before /i e ɛ/ appears to have initially resulted in an affricate, either [t͡ʃ] or [t͡s]. The outcome [t͡ʃ] is found in Italian and Romanian, while [t͡s] or a derivative thereof is found in many Western Romance languages (Note: It has been proposed that the original outcome throughout Western Romance was [t͡ʃ], later fronted to [t͡s] in most areas but peripherally surviving as [t͡ʃ] in Mozarabic and [ʃ] in modern Picard and northern Norman.) and also Aromanian. (Possible reasons for the outcome /t͡s/ were mentioned earlier.)

In Western Romance, intervocalic Latin /k/ before a front vowel was affected by both palatalization and voicing and so generally had an outcome distinct from that of initial or post-consonantal /k/ before /i e ɛ/. (Note: In Modern Spanish this is partly disguised by the devoicing of Old Spanish [d͡z] ⟨z⟩, followed by the replacement of ⟨ze zi⟩ with ⟨ce ci⟩. Cf. racimus > razimo > racimo.)

Some outcomes of /k ɡ/ + front vowel
| Branch | Language | k | | ɡ | |
| Branch | Language | initial | medial | initial | medial |
|---|---|---|---|---|---|
| Sardinian | Campidanese | t͡ʃ | ʒ | d͡ʒ | ∅ |
| Sardinian | Central Sardinian | k | | ɡ | ɣ |
| Sardinian | Logudorese | k | ɣ | ɡ | ∅ |
| Western Romance | West/North Friulian | t͡ʃ | ʒ | (d)ʒ/z | j/ʒ |
| Western Romance | East Friulian | s | z | ʒ/z | j/ʒ |
| Western Romance | Fassan | t͡ʃ | ʒ | | |
| Western Romance | Comelican | θ | ð | d/ð | |
| Western Romance | Livinallonghese | t͡ʃ | ʒ | | |
| Western Romance | Surselvan | t͡ʃ | ʒ | | ɟ |
| Western Romance | Sutselvan | t͡ʃ | ʒ | | ɟ/(ʒ) |
| Western Romance | Surmiran | t͡ʃ | ʒ | d͡ʒ | d͡z |
| Western Romance | Engadinian | (t)ʃ | ʒ | | ɟ/j |
| Western Romance | Venetian | (t)s/θ | z | (d)z/ð | (d)z/ð |
| Western Romance | Ligurian | s/(t͡s) | ʒ | z/(d͡z) | |
| Western Romance | Lombard | (t)ʃ/s | z | (d)ʒ/z | ʒ |
| Western Romance | Picard | ʃ | z/(ʒ) | ɡ (Note: Compare the forms recorded for northeastern Picard in ALF map 649.) | j |
| Western Romance | French | s | jz | ʒ | j |
| Western Romance | Franco-Provençal | s/(θ) | z/(ʒ) | d͡z/(z) | j |
| Western Romance | Auvergnat | s | z | d͡z | (d)ʒ/d͡z |
| Western Romance | Occitan | s | z | ʒ | |
| Western Romance | Catalan | s | z/ð | (d)ʒ | |
| Western Romance | Spanish | θ | | j/∅ | |
| Western Romance | Portuguese | s | z | ʒ | ʒ/∅ |
| Other | Romanian | t͡ʃ | | d͡ʒ | |
| Other | Vegliote | t͡ʃi, ke | | d͡ʒi, ɡe | d͡ʒi, ɡ(e) |
| Other | Calabrese | t͡ʃ | | j | |
| Other | Tuscan | ʃ | | d͡ʒ | d͡ːʒ |
| Other | Corsican | t͡ʃ | | ɟ/d͡ʒ | ɟ/j |

==== Postconsonantal ====
When preceded by a consonant, /k/ remained voiceless in Western Romance (as in Portuguese mercê from mercēdem). In some languages, /sk/ shows a special outcome. In Portuguese, /sk/ before a front vowel became /ʃ/, as in feixe, peixe from fascem, piscem. In Tuscan, /sk/ + front vowel became [ʃʃ] when intervocalic, [ʃ] elsewhere (seemingly via *[st͡ʃ] > *[ʃt͡ʃ] > [ʃʃ]).

== /k ɡ/ + /a/ ==
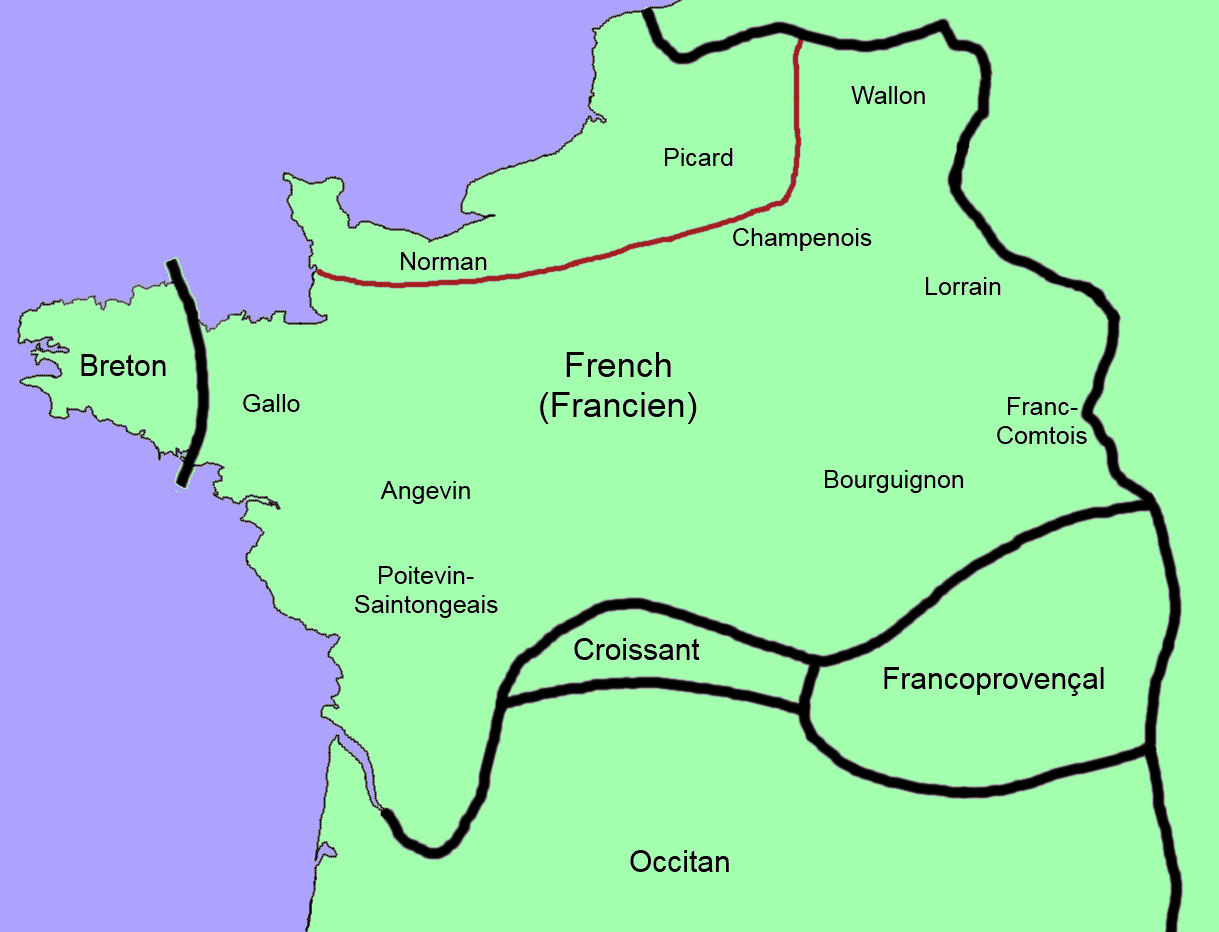
The Joret line (in red). Oïl dialects south or east of it show palatalized outcomes of /ka ɡa/.

In some Gallo-Romance languages, /k ɡ/ came to be palatalized before original /a/. This is assumed to have taken place more recently than the palatalization of /k ɡ/ before high and mid front vowels (see above) and can have a different outcome from the latter. Palatalization and affrication of /k/ before /a/ occurred in all central French dialects, but not in (north) Norman and (northwest) Picard dialects that lie north or west of the Joret line. Nevertheless, outcomes such as the Picard kièvre, kier < capram 'goat', carum 'dear' do show a sort of partial palatalization before fronted outcomes of Latin /a/ (coarticulation but not affrication). Accordingly, it has been suggested that this was the original environment for palatalization in other French dialects as well, at a time when the fronting of original /a/ in this context was still allophonic, and that the phenomenon later spread by analogy to any velar + /a/ sequence. An alternative theory holds that /a/ in general may have been a front vowel at the time, making it a trigger for palatalization. This happens to be the case in modern French, where the initial consonant in words like quatre 'four' may be palatalized to [kʲ] or [c].

In French, original /k/ before /a/ developed to a sound spelt ⟨ch⟩ ([t͡ʃ] in Old French and [ʃ] today), as in cantare 'sing' > chanter /ʃɑ̃te/. This remains distinct from the outcome of /k/ before /j/ and /i e ɛ/, as in centum 'hundred' > cent /sɑ̃/. Similarly, /ɡ/ before /a/ developed to a sound spelt ⟨j⟩ ([d͡ʒ] in Old French and [ʒ] today), as in gambam > jambe /ʒɑ̃b/. This apparently predated the general monophthongization of Latin au to French o, as it affected words like causam > chose and gaudia > joie. The implication, then, is that palatalization occurred before the end of the eighth century, perhaps as early as the end of the fifth or start of the sixth century.

The phenomenon is also found in Occitan, where it is attested since the earliest texts in that language. Northern dialects tend to have it and southern ones tend not to, but neither group is uniform in this regard, and the geographic extent of palatalization is subject to considerable lexical variation. That its distribution shows a clear weakening from north to south, and that toponyms with apparent retention of /ka ɡa/ can be found in northern palatalizing areas, suggests that this kind of palatalization was historically imported into Occitan from French dialects. The Occitan outcomes of /k ɡ/ palatalized by /a/ vary by dialect; they include [t͡ʃ d͡ʒ], [t͡s d͡z], [s z], and rarely [θ ð]. Compare Lemosin [d͡ʒaˈlinɔ] < gallinam 'hen' and southern Auvergnat [t͡sasˈtɛ(r)] < castellum 'castle'.

Aside from Gallo-Romance, palatalization of /ka ɡa/ is also found in Rhaeto-Romance (Note: Everywhere except Western Romansh, where the palatalization only occurs before stressed /a/. This seems to reflect the original environment from which Eastern Romansh, and perhaps the rest of Rhaeto-Romance, later extended the phenomenon to unstressed syllables. Curiously, in the Western Romansh (Sutselvan) dialect of Ems, the original velar /k/ appears to have been restored before stressed /a/.) and, in widely scattered traces, across the dialects of northern Italy (Gallo-Italic and Venetian). This is often thought to have a common origin with the aforementioned Gallo-Romance phenomenon, but it has also been suggested to be an independent development. Some varieties of Friulian show the affricate outcomes [t͡ʃ d͡ʒ], as in caballum > [t͡ʃaˈval] 'horse' and gambam > [ˈd͡ʒambe] 'leg', while in central and northern Friulian the plosive outcomes [c ɟ] are found instead.

== Velar + coronal ==
Latin /ɡn kt ks/ yield palatalized reflexes in much of Romance. According to some accounts, this resulted from the vocalization of the velar consonant, resulting in a glide [j] that then went to palatalize the following coronal (potentially coalescing with it). It has been alternatively hypothesized that palatalized pronunciations of these clusters could have arisen by gestural blending at a point where the first consonant was not yet vocalized.

=== /ɡn/ ===
The most widespread outcome of -gn- is [ɲ(ː)], merging with the outcome of /nj/. This is the case throughout Western Romance (cf. Spanish [ˈpuɲo], Portuguese [ˈpuɲu], Catalan [ˈpuɲ] < pugnum) and in Tuscan. (Note: In Italian, the merger of -gn- and /nj/ appears to postdate the raising of /e/ from Latin short /ĭ/ in a stressed syllable before original /nj/; compare gramigna < gramĭneam and legno < lĭgnum.)

In a few languages, -gn- developed instead to a sequence of semivowel + /n/:

- [jn] in some dialects of central and southern Italy.
- [wn] in some dialects of southern Italy, as in [ˈliwna] 'firewood' < ligna. This is found in a more limited area comprising Basilicata, central-southern Puglia, and central-northern Calabria.

Latin -gn- has non-palatalized outcomes in Romanian (where it developed to [mn], as in lignum > [ˈlemn] 'wood'), and in Sardinian (where it developed to [nn], as in lignum > [ˈlinnu]).

Loans into Albanian show a mixture of outcomes: sometimes /ɲ/ as in denjë, shenjë < dignum, signum; sometimes /n/ (Note: Which could then, like other instances of /n/, be lost in word-final position, as in vgje~vgjê < abiegnum) as in kunat~kunetën < cognatum; and sometimes /ŋ/ as in peng < pignum.

=== /kt ks/ ===
In Western Romance, intervocalic Latin /kt ks/ developed to [jt js]; [jt] could develop further into an affricate such as [t͡ʃ], and [js] fell together with the outcome of /ssj/ and shows various final outcomes including [ʃ].

- French originally had [jt js]; in modern French, the glide has been lost through coalescence with the preceding vowel. These are also sometimes found as outcomes of /pt ps/, implying a merger of these clusters with /kt ks/; this merger is sometimes attributed to a Gaulish substrate.
- Old Spanish had [t͡ʃ] and [ʃ]. The consonant [ʃ] became backed to [x] in later Spanish. Latin /kt/ became [t] in Spanish when preceded by the vowel [i] (from Latin /iː/), as in frīctum > frito.
- Portuguese has [jt] and [jʃ].
- In Occitan, /kt/ can result either in [jt] or in an affricate or fricative such as [t͡ʃ] [t͡s], [d͡ʒ], [s]. The outcome of /ks/ can be [js], [jʃ] or [ʃ].
- Rhaeto-Romance languages show a split in the outcome of /kt/. An affricate or palatal stop is found in Surselvan, Sutselvan, and most of Surmeiran. Engadinian dialects of Romansh show [t] (or in a handful of words [c]), as in factum > /fat/; the use of [t] is sometimes interpreted as a secondary development from [c] or as an outcome imported from Lombardy. The Italian Rhaeto-Romance languages show /t/ (as in Italian). In Ladin, /kt/ yields [t] and /ks/ generally yields [s], although some alternative outcomes are also found. The development of vowels before /kt ks/ in Ladin suggests the original presence of coda [j] or of palatalization in this context.

Outside of Western Romance, Latin /kt ks/ typically have non-palatalized outcomes:

- Italian has [tt ss], as in [ˈfatto] < factum or [ˈasse] < axem. However, /ks/ appears to have become [ʃʃ] instead in some isolated cases. It is unclear whether both outcomes are indigenous Tuscan developments. (Note: Before a front vowel, Italian [ʃʃ] could instead be the regular outcome of /sk/, which might have developed from /ks/ by metathesis, as in the case of ascella, which can be traced to ascella and ascilla, attested Late Latin variants of axilla (compare Welsh asgell). Words with [ʃʃ] before a back vowel, such as coscia < coxam, may have been borrowed from a non-Tuscan variety, such as Old French or Provençal. However, the words in which [ʃʃ] occurs in Tuscan do not appear to otherwise show signs of being words of exotic or north-western origin.)
- Romanian has [pt ps], as in [ˈfapt] < factum and [ˈkwapsə] < coxam. A common alternative outcome of /ks/ is /s/, as in [ləˈsa] < laxare. Original /ps/ also developed occasionally to /s/ in Romanian.

Some loans into Albanian show -ct- > /jt/ (as in directum > drejtë), which Orel attributes to borrowing from a West Balkan variety showing the same development as Western Romance, whereas others show the outcome /ft/ (as in luctam > luftë), with the velar changed to a labial as in Romanian.

==== /nkt/ ====
The sequence /nkt/ underwent palatalization in much of Western Romance. An evolution like *[nçt] > *[nc] > *[ntʲ] may be reconstructed for the modern outcomes [nt͡ɕ] (found in some Rhaeto-Romance varieties) and [nt͡ʃ] (found in some Occitan varieties). An alternative evolution like *[nçt] > *[ɲt] > [jnt] appears to have taken place in some other Occitan varieties as well as French. Other branches of Romance show non-palatalized outcomes, predominantly /nt/ (Italian, Catalan, Ibero-Romance) (Note: However, a preceding stage like *[ŋt] or *[ɲt] may be implied by the vowel raising seen in outcomes like *pĭnctum > Italian and Spanish pinto, Catalan pint (and not *pento, *pent).) but also /mt~nt/ (Balkan Romance). The outcomes of sanctum 'holy' include Occitan sanch, French saint; Catalan sant, Italian-Portuguese-Spanish santo; and Old Romanian sămtu (modern sânt).

=== /uls ult/ ===
In Spanish, Latin /ult uls/ show the same palatalized outcomes as /ukt uks/. This is probably a consequence of velarization of /l/ in this context. Per Penny, /ul/ before /t s/ developed to *[ou̯] and then *[oi̯]. Subsequently *[i̯] palatalized the following consonant, as in impulsat, multum > empuja, mucho. (This was blocked by a following consonant, as in vultur > buitre.) Similarly, Latin /ult/ yielded [ujt] in Aragonese (cf. ⟨scuitare⟩ for auscultare in the Glosas Emilianenses) and in Portuguese (cf. escuta < escuita < auscultat).

== Obstruent + /l/ ==
The Latin sequences /pl bl fl kl ɡl/ (Note: Including cases where these sequences developed in word-internal position via syncope of the Classical Latin unstressed u vowel: pul bul cul gul > /pl bl kl ɡl/. Syncope in tul resulted in /kl/, as in vetulus > Late Latin veclus.) yield palatalized reflexes in numerous Romance languages. This probably began with /l/ allophonically turning to [ʎ] after a velar consonant; the resulting inventory *[pl bl fl kʎ ɡʎ] is reflected in Balkan Romance, northern Abruzzese, old Gallo-Italic, and old Venetian.

Controversially, the outcomes in most of Gallo-Romance and Catalan can also be traced to the same original inventory if one assumes that there followed, for phonological reasons, a reversion of /kl ɡl/ *[kʎ ɡʎ] to [kl ɡl] in fortis positions (Note: Post-pausal or post-consonantal. Most commonly word-initial, even more so after the Gallo-Roman loss of most final vowels reduced the incidence of word-initial intervocalic contexts.) after the lenition of *[kʎ ɡʎ] to [ʎ] in lenis positions. (Note: Intervocalic, commonly word-internal.) This is at odds with the traditional view that Latin [kl ɡl] remained unchanged in fortis positions all along.

The outcomes in Italo-Romance (other than northern Abruzzese) can be traced to an inventory *[pʎ bʎ fʎ kʎ ɡʎ] that probably developed from the one described above via generalization of post-obstruent [ʎ]. The same is true for a U-shaped band of Gallo-Romance dialects that surround northern France and include most of Franco-Provençal.

In Ibero-Romance /pl fl kl/ most often merged to a single palatalized outcome, but there are also some words showing retention of /pl fl kl/ (or /l/ > /r/). Said retentions have often been attributed to borrowing or ‘learned’ influence from Latin, but lexical (in)frequency has also been proposed as an explanation, perhaps alongside factors like dissimilation or avoidance of homonymy. (Note: Muñoz, citing data drawn from a historical corpus of Spanish, concludes that frequency is a predictive factor in most cases (p < 0.05) and cites by way of explanation the theory that, during the period when a given sound-change is active, speakers are more likely to change their mental representation of a word to include that sound-change if the word is used frequently (and therefore often pronounced and heard with that change) and less likely to do so if it is used infrequently.) The earliest evidence for the merger of /pl fl kl/ to one (palatalized) sound is found in eleventh-century documents with forms like ⟨flosa⟩ for clausa, ⟨flano⟩ for plano, and ⟨aflamaront⟩ for acclamaverunt. The results of /bl ɡl/ are mixed but consistently non-palatal in word-initial position. (Note: Except, per Repetti, in cases where the initial result was /l-/ in dialects which subsequently palatalized all instances of word-initial /l/ (as mentioned below).)

Outcomes of obstruent + /l/ per Lausberg
| Language | pl | | bl | | fl | | kl | | ɡl | |
| Language | initial | medial | initial | medial | initial | medial | initial | medial | initial | medial |
|---|---|---|---|---|---|---|---|---|---|---|
| Romanian | pl | | bl | | fl | | kj | | ɡj | |
| Italian | pj | ppj | bj | bbj | fj | ffj | kj | kkj | ɡj | ɡɡj~ʎʎ |
| French | pl | bl~pl | bl | | fl | | kl | ʎ > j | ɡl | ʎ > j |
| Spanish | ʎ | βl | l | ʎ~βl | ʎ | ʎ~pl | ʎ | ʒ > x | l | ʒ > x |
| Portuguese | ʃ | bɾ | l | ʎ~l | ʃ | | ʃ | ʎ | l | ʎ |

=== Postconsonantal ===
After a consonant, Spanish and Portuguese show palatalization of Latin /pl fl kl/ to the voiceless affricate [t͡ʃ], as in Spanish amplum > ancho 'wide', inflare > hinchar 'to swell', and masculum > macho 'male' (Portuguese ancho, inchar, macho; ⟨ch⟩ in Portuguese developed from [t͡ʃ] to [ʃ]). There are also some cases in Spanish of /ɡl/ being palatalized in postconsonantal position, such as ungulam > uña (cf. the Mozarabic unya attested in the tenth century). In contrast, postconsonantal /kl ɡl/ show nonpalatalized outcomes in French and Catalan, as in masculum > French mâle, Catalan mascle and ungulam > French ongle, Catalan ungla.

=== Intervocalic /kl ɡl/ ===
In Gallo– and Ibero-Romance, intervocalic /kl ɡl/ developed to [ʎ], merging with the outcome of /lj/. There are competing explanations for this: one is /kl/ > [kʎ] > [çʎ] > [ʎ], another is /kl/ > [çl] > [jl] > [jʎ] > [ʎ] (the latter parallel to the development of /-kt ks-/). (Note: Possible evidence against the latter can be seen in the differing French vowel outcomes before intervocalic /kl/ on the one hand and /ks kt/ on the other. Compare ŏculum, *trŏculum, gubernaculum, maculam > œil, treuil, gouvernail, maille /œj tʁœj ɡuvɛʁnaj maj/ with cŏxam, nŏctem, axem, factum > cuisse, nuit, ais, fait /kɥis nɥi ɛ fɛ/.)

In Italian and Romanian, intervocalic /kl/ instead shows loss of lateral articulation rather than loss of the original stop, as in oculum > Italian occhio 'eye' (with /kkj/) or auriculam > Romanian ureche 'ear' (with /c/).

In Friulian, the general outcome of intervocalic /kl/ is /l/ with a number of words showing /ɡl/ instead, sometimes in variation with /l/. It has been proposed that the different outcomes can be explained by word-stress, but the data seem too inconsistent to support this. In Ladin, intervocalic /kl/ was conserved in the dialects of Sol and Non; (Note: In the dialect of Non, a vowel was later inserted after /k/ in various masculine words, which led to palatalization. Cf. battuaculum > batèc(j)el 'chatterbox, talkative man' versus the feminine batècla.) voiced to /ɡl/ in the dialect of Fodom; and (perhaps under Germanic influence) turned to /dl/ in the dialects of Gardena, Badia, and Mareo.

== /ll nn/ and initial /l n/ ==
=== /ll l-/ ===
Latin /ll/ was palatalized to [ʎ] in Asturian, Leonese, Spanish, Aragonese, and Catalan. This appears to have been a relatively late development. In some areas this [ʎ] merged with an identical outcome of Latin /lj/ (and /kl ɡl/).

In Catalan, as well as some western dialects of Asturian, word-initial /l/ was also palatalized to [ʎ]. In other western dialects of Asturian, and also of Leonese, there is a variety of palatalized outcomes collectively dubbed the 'che vaqueira'. The earliest evidence for the palatalization of /l-/ is found in tenth-century documents from the Kingdom of León, which show forms like ⟨lliueram⟩ and ⟨llexastis⟩ for libram and laxavistis.

=== /nn n-/ ===
Latin /nn/ was palatalized in much the same area as /ll/. Cf. annum 'year' > Astur-Leonese a[ɲ]u, Spanish a[ɲ]o, Aragonese a[ɲ]o, and Catalan a[ɲ].

Palatalization of word-initial /n/ to [ɲ] is also found in Astur-Leonese.

== Morphological consequences ==
=== Verbs ===
The original presence of either [j] or a front vowel in some conjugations but not in others resulted in patterns of alternation between different stems for different person-number combinations. These alternations were frequently subject to morphological leveling, but they could alternatively be extended by analogy to verbs with different etymologies; these competing tendencies often resulted in irregular verb outcomes.

The outcomes of the verb colligo (discussed above) provide examples of leveling and analogical extension. In Spanish, it initially developed to cuelgo, but this was later changed under the influence of the form coge to coxgo, which in modern Spanish has been fully leveled to cojo.

In Italian, the [lɡ] found in the forms colgo, scelgo < colligo, *exeligo was extended by analogy to some verb forms that originally had [lj], such as doleo > doglio (by regular sound change) and dolgo (analogical), salio > salgo (by analogy), and valgo.

=== Nouns ===
In Romanian, the masculine plural ending /-i/ and the feminine /-e/ regularly palatalize a preceding velar consonant. For example, the plurals of [koˈleɡ] and [koˈleɡə] ('colleague', masculine and feminine respectively) are [koˈled͡ʒʲ] and [koˈled͡ʒe].

The Italian masculine plural /-i/ often does so as well, but this is not systematic; compare the alternating [aˈmiko]~[aˈmit͡ʃi] 'male friend(s)' with the non-alternating [ˈbaŋko]~[ˈbaŋki] 'desk(s)'.

== Orthographic consequences ==
In some cases, the spelling of palatalized consonants simply remained the same as that of the Latin sounds or sequences that they originated from. For instance, in Spanish ⟨ll⟩ represents the palatal lateral [ʎ] (which often developed from Latin ⟨ll⟩, as in castillo [kasˈtiʎo] < castellum) and ⟨ñ⟩ (originally an abbreviation of ⟨nn⟩) represents the palatal nasal [ɲ] (which often developed from Latin /nn/, as in caña [ˈkaɲa] < canna). Spellings like these could be extended to words where palatalized consonants had other etymological origins, as in Spanish llama 'flame' < flamma and señor 'mister' < seniorem. In some cases, a spelling convention passed beyond its language of origin, as in the use of ⟨ll⟩ for [ʎ] in Galician (cf. filla [ˈfiʎa] < filiam), despite Galician not experiencing a general change of Latin /ll/ to /ʎ/.

Similarly, the historic palatalization of /k ɡ/ before front vowels is responsible for the letters ⟨c g⟩ standing for various 'soft' sounds when written before a front vowel (in French and Portuguese [s ʒ], in Italian and Romanian [t͡ʃ d͡ʒ]). This spread to English via Old French and replaced the Old English use of the letters ⟨c g⟩. To represent [t͡ʃ d͡ʒ] before a back vowel, Italian uses ⟨c g⟩ followed by a silent ⟨i⟩, as in oncia /ˈont͡ʃa/ < unciam. This can lead to orthographic ambiguity with learned borrowings from Latin where ⟨i⟩ represents /i/; cf. the borrowed astrologia /astroloˈd͡ʒia/ and the native Perugia /peˈrud͡ʒa/.

In a number of languages ⟨i⟩ was generalized as a means of representing [d͡ʒ], [ʒ], or developments thereof. In early modern times a new letter ⟨j⟩ was introduced for this purpose.

Latin ⟨z⟩, originally limited to words of Greek origin, became generalized as a means of representing [d͡z], thus for instance Old Spanish fazer [haˈd͡zeɾ] < facere. In Italian the same spelling was also applied not only to [d͡z] but also to [t͡s] (despite the ambiguity), as in pozzo [ˈpott͡so] < puteum. In Iberia the letter ⟨ç⟩ (originally a variant form of ⟨z⟩) came to be used for [t͡s], as in Old Galician-Portuguese praça [ˈpɾat͡sa] < plateam; this practice also spread into France and Italy. The grapheme ⟨ç⟩ came to be reinterpreted as a version of ⟨c⟩ with a diacritic marking its 'soft' pronunciation in contexts where it would otherwise be pronounced 'hard' (i.e. when not followed by a front vowel, as in ⟨ça ço çu⟩ or at the end of a word).

=== New sequences of velar + front vowel ===
After the palatalization of /k ɡ/ before front vowels, many Romance languages eventually simplified /kw ɡw/ to /k ɡ/, resulting in new sequences of /k ɡ/ + front vowel. Consequently, in a number of languages the Latin spellings ⟨qu gu⟩ became reinterpreted as a means of indicating that a consonant was velar despite being followed by a front vowel. Thus for instance *sequire > Portuguese seguir /seˈɡiɾ/, (Note: A spelling like *segir would suggest the pronunciation */seˈʒiɾ/.) with ⟨qu gu⟩ also extended to words that never had a /w/, as in vaqueiro /vaˈkejɾu/ < vaccarium.

Italian, which often retained Latin /w/ in that context (cf. seguire [seˈɡwire] < *sequire), did not end up using ⟨qu gu⟩ for /k ɡ/ + front vowel. Instead, it borrowed the scholarly Latin practice of using ⟨ch⟩ to indicate /k/ (no matter the following sound) with an analogical ⟨gh⟩ added for /ɡ/. Thus chiedere [ˈkjɛdere] < quaerere or ghiro [ˈɡiro] < glirus.

=== Morphological alternations ===
In many cases front vowels occurring in noun or verb endings did not trigger the palatalization of a preceding velar consonant. This is broadly the case for the present subjunctive in Italo-Western Romance, which leads to spelling alternations of the type seen in Catalan toca 'he touches' versus toqui '[that] he touch', pronounced [ˈtɔkə] and [ˈtɔki] respectively. In Italian such alternations occur not only in verbs but also nouns, since velar consonants often remain unpalatalized before the masculine plural ending /-i/ and always before the feminine /-e/. Thus the plurals of luogo 'place' and amica 'girlfriend' are luoghi and amiche, pronounced [ˈlwɔɡi] and [aˈmike].

Spellings of certain sounds in inherited words (Note: The Catalan and Spanish dialects used for reference here are Barcelonan and Madrileño (but without yeísmo). † indicates "obsolete". Read ⟨z⟩† as "Old [Spanish, etc.] ⟨z⟩". ⟨ᶠᵛ⟩ stands for "front vowel". Read ⟨scᶠᵛ⟩ as "⟨sc⟩ before a front vowel".)
| Sound | Portuguese | Spanish | Catalan | French | Italian | Romanian |
|---|---|---|---|---|---|---|
| /t͡s/ | ⟨cᶠᵛ ç⟩† | | | ⟨cᶠᵛ ç z⟩† | ⟨z ç†⟩ | ⟨ț ц†⟩ |
| /s/ (not from Latin /s/) | ⟨cᶠᵛ ç⟩ | ∅ | ⟨cᶠᵛ ç⟩ | | ∅ | |
| /θ/ | ∅ | ⟨cᶠᵛ z⟩ | ∅ | | | |
| /d͡z/ | ⟨z⟩† | | ⟨tz⟩ | ⟨z⟩† | ⟨z⟩ | ⟨ḑ дз ѕ⟩† |
| /z/ (not from Latin /s/) | ⟨z⟩ | ∅ | ⟨z⟩ | ⟨s z⟩ | ∅ | ⟨z з†⟩ |
| /t͡ʃ/ | ⟨ch⟩† | ⟨ch⟩ | ⟨-ig⟩ | ⟨ch⟩† | ⟨cᶠᵛ⟩ | ⟨cᶠᵛ ч†⟩ |
| /ʃ/ | ⟨x ch⟩ | ⟨x⟩† | ⟨(i)x⟩ | ⟨ch⟩ | ⟨scᶠᵛ⟩ | ⟨ș ш†⟩ |
| /d͡ʒ/ | ⟨gᶠᵛ j⟩† | ∅ | ⟨gᶠᵛ† j† tg tj⟩ | ⟨gᶠᵛ j⟩† | ⟨gᶠᵛ⟩ | ⟨gᶠᵛ џ†⟩ |
| /ʒ/ | ⟨gᶠᵛ j⟩ | ⟨gᶠᵛ j⟩† | ⟨gᶠᵛ j⟩ | | ⟨ᵛsgⁱ⟩† | ⟨j ж†⟩ |
| /x/ | ∅ | ⟨gᶠᵛ j⟩ | ∅ | | | |
| /ʎ/ | ⟨lh⟩ | ⟨ll⟩ | ⟨ll ly†⟩ | ⟨(i)ll(i)⟩† | ⟨gli⟩ | ⟨ʌᶠᵛ†⟩ |
| /ɲ/ | ⟨nh⟩ | ⟨nn† ñ⟩ | ⟨ny⟩ | ⟨gn⟩ | | ⟨ɴᶠᵛ†⟩ |
| /k/ᶠᵛ | ⟨qu⟩ | | ⟨qu k†⟩ | ⟨qu k† ch†⟩ | ⟨ch⟩ | ⟨ch k† к†⟩ |
| /ɡ/ᶠᵛ | ⟨gu⟩ | | | | ⟨gh⟩ | ⟨gh g† г†⟩ |

== Bibliography ==
- Alkire, Ti; Rosen, Carol (2010). Romance languages: A historical introduction. Cambridge University Press. ISBN 978-0-521-88915-5.
- Baglioni, Daniele (2014). "Il nesso GN dal latino alle lingue romanze: Questioni aperte e prospettive di ricerca". In Molinelli, Piera; Cuzzolin, Pierluigi; Fedriani, Chiara (eds.). Actes du Xᵉ colloque international sur le latin vulgaire et tardif. Bergamo University Press. pp. 3–24.
- Barbato, Marcello (2019). "La palatalizzazione in romanzo occidentale: Cronologia e tipologia". Zeitschrift für romanische Philologie. 135 (4): 937–970. doi:10.1515/zrp-2019-0057.
- Barbato, Marcello (2022). "The early history of Romance palatalizations". Oxford Research Encyclopedias. doi:10.1093/acrefore/9780199384655.013.750. ISBN 978-0-19-938465-5.
- Bateman, Nicoleta (2007). A Crosslinguistic Investigation of Palatalization (PhD thesis). UC San Diego.
- Bourciez, Édouard (1921) [1889]. Précis historique de phonétique française (5th ed.). Paris: Klincksieck.
- Boyd-Bowman, Peter (1980) [1954]. From Latin to Romance in sound charts (3rd ed.). Washington: Georgetown University Press.
- Brittain, Margaret Sabina (1900). Historical primer of French phonetics and inflection. Oxford: Clarendon Press.
- Buckley, Eugene (2009). "Phonetics and phonology in Gallo-Romance palatalisation". Transactions of the Philological Society. 107: 31–65. doi:10.1111/j.1467-968X.2008.00212.x.
- Burger, André (1955). "Phonématique et diachronie à propos de la palatalisation des consonnes romanes". Cahiers Ferdinand de Saussure. 13 (13): 19–33. JSTOR 27757997.
- Canalis, Stefano (2017). "The voiced and voiceless outcomes of intervocalic -sj- in Old Tuscan". Quaderni di Linguistica e Studi Orientali. 3: 157–182. doi:10.13128/QULSO-2421-7220-21343.
- Carnoy, Albert Joseph (1916). "Some obscurities in the assibilation of ti and di before a vowel in Vulgar Latin". Transactions and Proceedings of the American Philological Association. 47: 145–152. doi:10.2307/282832. JSTOR 282832.
- De Cia, Simone; Iubini-Hampton, Jessica (2020). "Debunking Rhaeto-Romance: Synchronic evidence from two peripheral Northern Italian dialects". Modern Languages Open. 7 (1) 7: 1–18. doi:10.3828/mlo.v0i0.309.
- Grandgent, Charles Hall (1933) [1927]. From Latin to Italian: An historical outline of the phonology and morphology of the Italian language (2nd ed.). Cambridge: Harvard University Press.
- Haiman, John; Benincà, Paola (1992). The Rhaeto-Romance languages. London: Routledge. doi:10.4324/9780203992487. ISBN 978-1-134-96548-9.
- Hanssen, Federico (1913). Gramática histórica de la lengua castellana. Halle: Niemeyer.
- Jensen, Frede (1972). From Vulgar Latin to Old Provençal. Chapel Hill: The University of North Carolina Press.
- Kerkhof, Peter Alexander (2018). Language, law and loanwords in early medieval Gaul: Language contact and studies in Gallo-Romance phonology (Thesis). hdl:1887/66116.
- Kristol, Andres (2023). "Southern Gallo-Romance: Occitan and Gascon". Oxford Research Encyclopedias. doi:10.1093/acrefore/9780199384655.013.740. ISBN 978-0-19-938465-5.
- Kutzner, Evelyn Beatrice (1982). A synchronic study of dental consonants preceding yod in French and its implications for a diachronic analysis (PDF) (Thesis).
- Lausberg, Heinrich (1970) [1965]. Lingüística románica. Vol. I–II. Translated by Pérez Riesco, José; Pascual Rodríguez, E. (2nd ed.). Madrid: Gredos.
  - Original in German: Romanische Sprachwissenshaft. Berlin: De Gruyter. 1956–62.
- Loporcaro, Michele (2009). "Phonological processes". In Martin, Maiden; Smith, John Charles; Ledgeway, Adam (eds.). The Cambridge history of the Romance languages. Cambridge University Press. pp. 109–154. doi:10.1017/CHOL9780521800723. ISBN 978-0-511-78013-4.
- Lloyd, Paul Max (1987). From Latin to Spanish: Historical phonology and morphology of the Spanish language. Philadelphia: American Philosophical Society. ISBN 978-0-87169-173-6.
- Mackenzie, Ian (1999–2022). "The linguistics of Spanish".
- Maiden, Martin (2013) [1995]. A linguistic history of Italian. London: Routledge.
- Maiden, Martin (2016). "Dalmatian". In Ledgeway, Adam; Maiden, Martin (eds.). The Oxford guide to the Romance languages. Oxford University Press. pp. 658–668. doi:10.1093/acprof:oso/9780199677108.001.0001. ISBN 978-0-19-967710-8.
- Maiden, Martin (2018). "Romanian iotacization and the morphology of second person singular present verb-forms. The type (tu) vii, (tu) rămâi". Revue Roumaine de Linguistique. 63 (4): 325–340.
- Malkiel, Yakov (1982). "Interplay of sounds and forms in the shaping of three Old Spanish medial consonant clusters". Hispanic Review. 50 (3): 247–266. doi:10.2307/472853. JSTOR 472853.
- Mari, Tommaso (2016). Consentius' De barbarismis et metaplasmis: Critical edition, translation, and commentary (PhD thesis). University of Oxford.
- Merlo, Roberto (2014). "Un problema trascurato di fonetica storica romena: La "palatalizzazione delle velari" tra eredità latina e interferenze slave". Dacoromania. 19: 165–197.
- Mooney, Damien (2022). "Occitan". In Gabriel, Christoph; Gess, Randall; Meisenburg, Trudel (eds.). Manual of Romance phonetics and phonology. Berlin: De Gruyter. pp. 709–742. doi:10.1515/9783110550283. hdl:1983/44e3b3cd-164e-496b-a7a6-6b3a492e4c48. ISBN 978-3-11-055028-3.
- Muñoz, Quintana Sonia (2007). La palatalización incompleta de los grupos /pl-/, /fl-/, y /kl-/ en español: Un análisis del papel de la frecuencia (Thesis). Miami University.
- Nyrop, Kristoffer (1914) [1899]. Grammaire historique de la langue française. Vol. 1 (3rd ed.). Copenhagen: Gyldendal.
- Operstein, Natalie (2010). Consonant structure and prevocalization. Current Issues in Linguistic Theory. Vol. 312. Amsterdam: John Benjamins. doi:10.1075/cilt.312. ISBN 978-90-272-4828-2.
- Orel, Vladimir (2000). A concise historical grammar of the Albanian language: Reconstruction of Proto-Albanian. Leiden: Brill.
- Penny, Ralph (2002) [1991]. A history of the Spanish language (2nd ed.). Cambridge University Press. doi:10.1017/CBO9780511992827. ISBN 978-0-521-80587-2.
- Menéndez-Pidal, Ramón (1956) [1926]. Orígines del español: Estado lingüistico de la península ibérica hasta el siglo XI (4th ed.). Madrid: Espasa-Calpe.
- Pope, Mildred Katherine (1952) [1934]. From Latin to Modern French (2nd ed.). Manchester University Press.
- Rasico, Philip Donald (2020). "Early Medieval Catalan". In Argenter, Joan A.; Lüdtke, Jens (eds.). Manual of Catalan linguistics. Berlin: De Gruyter. pp. 437–469. doi:10.1515/9783110450408. ISBN 978-3-11-045040-8.
- Recasens, Daniel (2020). "Palatalizations in the Romance languages". Oxford Research Encyclopedias. doi:10.1093/acrefore/9780199384655.013.435. ISBN 978-0-19-938465-5.
- Recasens, Daniel (2023). Consonant-induced sound changes in stressed vowels in Romance: Assimilatory, dissimilatory and diphthongization processes. Berlin: De Gruyter. doi:10.1515/9783110990805. ISBN 978-3-11-099080-5.
- Repetti, Lori; Tuttle, Edward Fowler (1987). "The evolution of Latin PL, BL, and CL, GL in Western Romance". Studi mediolatini e volgari. 33: 53–115.
- Repetti, Lori (2016). "Palatalization". In Ledgeway, Adam; Maiden, Martin (eds.). The Oxford guide to the Romance languages. Oxford University Press. pp. 658–668. doi:10.1093/acprof:oso/9780199677108.001.0001. ISBN 978-0-19-967710-8.
- Rohlfs, Gerhard (1966). Grammatica storica della lingua italiana e dei suoi dialetti. Vol. II. Translated by Persichino, Salvatore. Turin: Einaudi.
  - Original in German: Historische Grammatik der italienischen Sprachen. Bern: Francke. 1949.
- Sala, Marius (1976). Contributions à la phonétique historique du roumain. Paris: Klincksieck. ISBN 978-2-252-01894-1.
- Sampson, Rodney (1995). "Romanian Vowel Nasalization and the Palatal Nasal /ɲ/". The Slavonic and East European Review. 73 (4): 601–612.
- Tuttle, Edwin Hotchkiss (1912). "Colligere in Spanish". Romanic Review. 3: 422–423.
- Väänänen, Veikko (1966) [1937]. Le latein vulgaire des inscriptions pompéiennes (3rd ed.). Berlin: Verlag.
- Weiss, Michael (2009). Outline of the historical and comparative grammar of Latin. New York: Beech Stave Press.
- Williams, Edwin Bucher (1962) [1938]. From Latin to Portuguese: Historical phonology and morphology of the Portuguese language (2nd ed.). Philadelphia: University of Pennsylvania Press.
- Wireback, Kenneth James (2002). "On the metathesis of labials + /j/ in Hispano-Romance". Hispanic Review. 70 (3): 311–331. doi:10.2307/3247205. JSTOR 3247205.
- Zampaulo, André (2019). Palatal sound change in the Romance languages: Diachronic and synchronic perspectives. Oxford University Press. doi:10.1093/oso/9780198807384.001.0001. ISBN 978-0-19-880738-4.
