= Lausberg area =

Linguistically diverse area

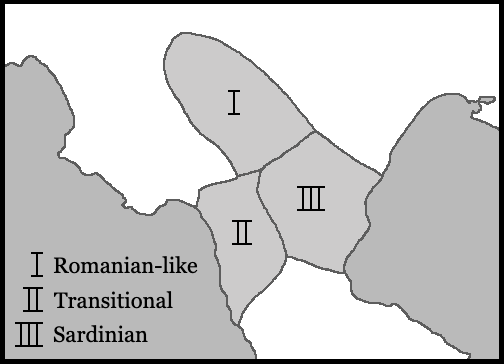
Approximate isogloss lines.

The Lausberg area is a part of southern Italy, covering much of Basilicata and the northern edge of Calabria, where Southern Italian dialects are spoken that show vowel developments atypical of Italo-Romance. The area is named after Heinrich Lausberg, who brought it to the attention of scholarship in 1939.

== Stressed vowel outcomes ==
There are three main subdivisions, as can be seen on the map to the right.

=== Romanian-like ===
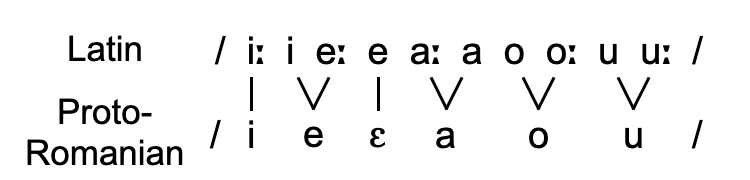
Vowel changes from Latin to (Proto-)Romanian

Dubbed the Vorposten (“outpost”) by Lausberg, this area encompasses the towns of Castelmezzano, Potenza, and Picerno. Here the Latin vowel /i/ merged with /eː/, while /u/ merged with /uː/. The same asymmetric vowel development characterizes Balkan Romance languages such as Romanian.

=== Transitional ===
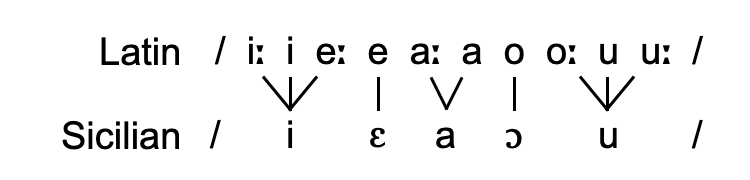
Vowel changes from Latin to Sicilian

The western part of Lausberg's Mittelzone (“central area”) encompasses the towns of Lauria, Maratea, Scalea, Diamante, and Verbicaro. Here the majority of words show a stressed vowel development similar to that of Sicilian, although many words show Sardinian-like outcomes as well.

=== Sardinian-like ===
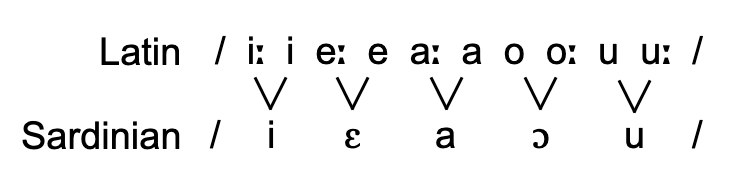
Vowel changes from Latin to Sardinian

The eastern part of the Mittelzone encompasses the towns of Senise, Tursi, and Oriolo. Here the tonic vowels developed approximately as in Sardinian. There is evidence, however, of an earlier distinction between Latin /eː oː/ and /e o/. In the variety spoken in Senise, for instance, the outcomes of Latin /e/ and /o/ were subject to diphthongization when stressed and followed by a syllable containing a close vowel (namely /i/ or /u/), while the outcomes of /eː/ and /oː/ were not. Cf. Latin /fokum, nepoːteːs/ > */ˈfɔku, neˈpoti/ > [ˈfwokə, nəˈpʊtə].

== Selected lexical comparisons ==
Below are the (non-metaphonic) stressed vowel outcomes in the three regions, each represented here by one dialect.

Latin	ˈfiːlum	ˈniwem	ˈteːlam	ˈpedem	ˈpaːnem	ˈkanem	ˈkor	ˈsoːlem	ˈkrukem	ˈluːnam
Castelmezzano	ˈfilə	ˈnevə ˈtela ˈperə			ˈpanə ˈkanə		ˈkorə ˈsolə		ˈkrutʃə ˈlunə	
Verbicaro	ˈfɪlə ˈnɪva ˈtɪla			ˈpɛtra	ˈpanə ˈkanə		ˈkɔrə	ˈsʊlə ˈkrʊtʃa ˈlʊna		
Senise	ˈfilə ˈnivə		ˈtɛlə ˈpɛrə		ˈpanə ˈkanə		ˈkɔrə ˈsɔlə		ˈkrutʃə ˈlunə	
English	thread	snow	canvas	foot	bread	dog	heart	sun	cross	moon

Here is a comparison of the present indicative conjugations of the verb meaning “to die” in the Mittelzone. Asterisks indicate forms that induce syntactic doubling.

	San Chirico	Aliano	Castelluccio	Noepoli	Amendolara	Papasidero
1SG	ˈmɔrə	ˈmɔrəjə	ˈmɔrəkə	ˈmɔrə~ˈmuərə	ˈmɔrrə	ˈmɔru
2SG	ˈmwerəsə	ˈmɔrəsə	ˈmuːrəsə	ˈmuərəsə	ˈmuːrəsə	ˈmuːrisi
3SG	ˈmwerətə	ˈmɔrətə	ˈmurə*	ˈmuərədə	ˈmuːrədə	ˈmuri*
1PL	muˈriəmə	muˈrɛmə	muˈrimə	muˈriəmə	muˈrimə	muˈrimu
2PL	muˈriəsə	muˈrɛsə	muˈrisə	muˈriətəsə	muˈritəsə	muˈrisi
3PL	ˈmɔrənə	ˈmɔrənə	ˈmɔrənə	ˈmɔrənə	ˈmuːrənə	ˈmɔrunu

== Bibliography ==
- Lausberg, Heinrich (1939). Die mundarten Südlukaniens (in German). Halle: Niemeyer.
- Loporcaro, Michele (2011). "Phonological processes". In Maiden, Martin; Smith, John Charles; Ledgeway, Adam (eds.). The Cambridge history of the Romance languages. Vol. 1. Cambridge University Press. pp. 109–154.
- Ledgeway, Adam (2016). "The dialects of southern Italy". In Ledgeway, Adam; Maiden, Martin (eds.). The Oxford guide to the Romance languages. Oxford University Press. pp. 246–269.
- Trumper, John (1997). "Calabria and southern Basilicata". In Maiden, Martin; Parry, Mair (eds.). The dialects of Italy. London: Routledge. pp. 355–364.
