= Limba Sarda Comuna =

Orthographic standard for Sardinian

Limba Sarda Comuna (LSC) is an orthography for the Sardinian language, created with the aim of transcribing the many variants of spoken Sardinian, with their distinctive characteristics, in the same way, and adopted experimentally in 2006 by the Autonomous Region of Sardinia for the official writing of its acts, jointly with Italian.

== Features ==
The LSC was created starting from the Sardinian "mesania" dialects, in the gray transition area between the ones often written with the Logudorese traditional orthographies and the Campidanese ones, and therefore stands morphologically and phonetically as an intermediate variety between the different varieties of spoken or literary Sardinian already existing, and tries to represent their common elements. The nearest dialect to it is the Abbasanta one, with a 90,03% similarity.

It is therefore a standard based on a "natural" and not "artificial" language, placing itself in affinity with the Limba de mesania (LdM or LDM) proposal, which derives from the Mesanist cultural movement, inclined to the idea of a variant chosen as a written standard, that also affirms the specificity of Sardinian in the Romance languages group that descends from Western Vulgar Latin (plural with the accusative case) with Catalan, Spanish, Provençal, Portuguese, etc., differently to Italian that, like Romanian, descends from Eastern Latin (plural with the nominative case).

It is also an evolution of the LImba Sarda Unificada (LSU) proposal, published in 2001, which had been heavily criticized for its artificiality, as well as for the absence of references to the southern varieties of Sardinian (the ones usually associated to the Campidanese orthography), as it was accused to be exclusively based on the central-northern ones (the ones associated to Logudorese).

Regarding the lexicon, the LSC document leaves it substantially free, providing for the possibility of using all the "hereditary words, even if of limited use to some variants", with the coexistence of various geosinonyms such as lègiu/feu, pòddighe/didu, àghina/ua, chèrrere/bòlere, etc., treated as synonyms, although reducing the variants of words with the same etymology to a single graphic form (faeddare instead of fueddai, foeddare, faveddare, faiddare, fueddari, etc.), generally favoring the etymology in the model choice (even if this is not always the case, as in the case of "abba", chosen as the correct graphic form instead of the southern "àcua", or in the case of "lughe", chosen to the detriment of the Nuorese-Baronian form "luche"). For scientific uses, while in the presence of several synonyms, the choice of terms considered more "neutral" is recommended, because they are more widespread or because they are directly derived from Latin. However using the other synonyms is also allowed, especially for literary uses.

The 2006 regional resolution document establishing the LSC, which defines this standard spelling as "open to additions", highlightes the fact that "all solutions are of equal linguistic value, but it is necessary for clarity reasons for writers or translators to make a choice. Limba Sarda Comuna, as a written reference and "representation" norm, should work over time towards representing Sardinian as a whole and not to transcribe all of the local varieties, which would be difficult to propose in the context of giving Sardinian an official supra-local and supra-municipal use".

However, the possibility of using the various phonetic forms of the same lemma "while writing using the local varieties" is recognized, implicitly recognizing a coexistence between the standard orthographic norm and various other spellings for local use.

In the document, any kind of reference to the syntax to be used is completely absent, meaning that the choice is left to the writer's competence.

== Official adoption of the Limba Sarda Comuna ==
The Limba Sarda Comuna was experimentally adopted by the Autonomous Region of Sardinia with Regional Council Resolution n. 16/14 of April 18, 2006 (Limba Sarda Comuna. Adozione delle norme di riferimento a carattere sperimentale per la lingua scritta in uscita dell'Amministrazione regionale) as the official orthography for the acts and documents issued by the Sardinian Regional Government (even if by art.8 of Law 482/99 only the text written in Italian has legal value), giving citizens the right to write to the Institution in their own dialect and establishing the regional language desk Ufitziu de sa Limba Sarda regionale.

The commission that formulated the orthography was composed of Giulio Angioni, Roberto Bolognesi, Manlio Brigaglia, Michel Contini, Diegu Corràine, Giovanni Lupinu, Anna Oppo, Giulio Paulis, Maria Teresa Pinna Catte e Mario Puddu.

== Usage ==
The Sardinian Regional Government in recent years has followed the LSC standard in the translation of many documents and resolutions, the names of its offices and departments, as well as its own name Regione Autònoma de Sardigna, which appears today in the official coat of arms together with the Italian wording .

In addition to it, the LSC experimental standard has been used as a voluntary choice by various other institutions, schools and by the press in written communication, often in a complementary way with other spelling norms closer to a local pronunciation.

Regarding this use a percentage estimate was made, only taking into consideration projects financed or co-financed by the Region for the use of Sardinian in municipal and supra-municipal language desks, in school teaching and in the media from 2007 to 2013.

The Monitoring on the experimental use of Limba Sarda Comuna 2007-2013 was published on the Autonomous Region's website in April 2014 by the Sardinian Language and Culture Service of the Department of Education.

For example, this research shows, with regard to school projects funded in 2013, a clear preference by schools in the use of the LSC spelling together with a local spelling (51%) compared to the exclusive use of LSC (11%) or the exclusive use of a local spelling (33%).

On the other hand, with regard to the projects financed in 2012 by the Regional Government for the realization of editorial projects in Sardinian in the regional media, there is a wider presence of LSC use (probably also due to a 2-points reward in the funding access rankings formation, missing in the document made for schools). According to these data, it appears that 35% of textual production in media projects was in LSC, 35% in LSC and in a local spelling norm and 25% exclusively in a local spelling norm.

Finally, the language counters co-financed by the Region in 2012 used LSC in their writing for 50%, LSC for 9% together with local spelling and for 41% exclusively local spelling.

A recent research on the use of LSC in schools, carried out in the municipality of Orosei, showed that the students of the local middle school had no problem using that orthography despite the fact that the Sardinian they spoke was partly different. No pupil refused the norm or considered it "artificial", which proved its validity as a didactic tool. The results were presented in 2016 and published in full in 2021.

== Proposed amendments ==
From 2006 to 2014, various proposals for the amendment of the LSC were published, especially through the internet, all aimed at bringing it closer to the pronunciation of the southern dialects of Sardinian, considered by many the ones spoken by the majority of sardophones.

Among these proposals we have that made by Professor Francisco Xavier Frias Conde, Spanish philologist and Romanist at the National University of Distance Education (UNED), who was coordinator of the Revista de Flilologìa Romànica Ianua, published by Romania minor. He is a writer in Galician and Spanish and the author of several essays in Italian and Sardinian on the problems of Sardinian linguistics.

This essay is titled ''Proposals to improve the LSC Sardinian standard''.

Another proposal is the one made by Professor Roberto Bolognesi, who proposed some measures to allow all Sardinians to read the orthography according to their pronunciation, by using some simple reading rules.
