= Sardinian phonology =

Phonology of the Sardinian language

Sardinian is conventionally divided, mainly on phonological criteria, into three main varieties: Campidanese, Logudorese, and Nuorese. (Note: Nuorese, however, is often regarded as a subdivision of Logudorese.) The last of these has a notably conservative phonology, compared not only to the other two varieties, but also to other Romance languages as well.

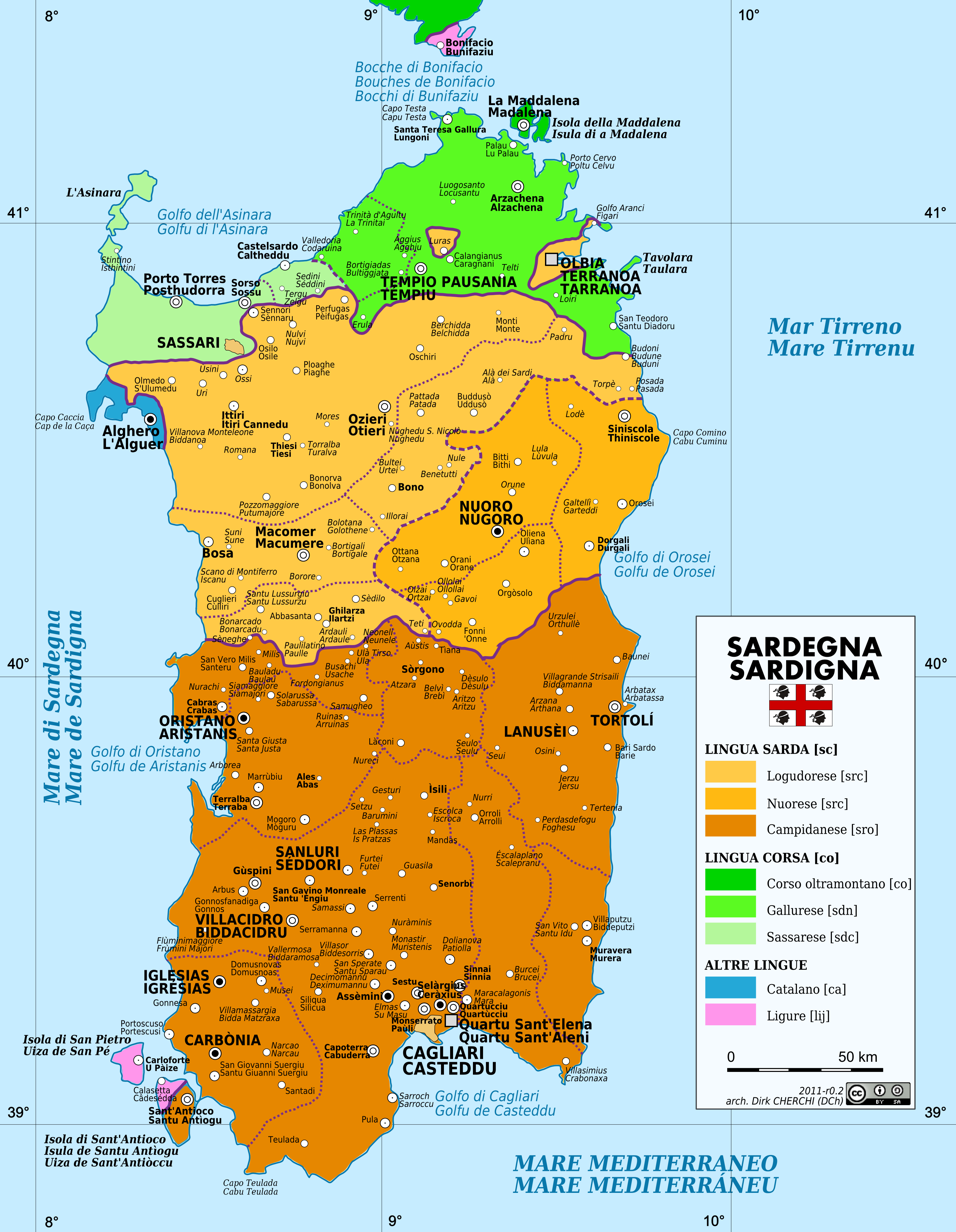
Map showing the approximate boundaries of the main dialects.

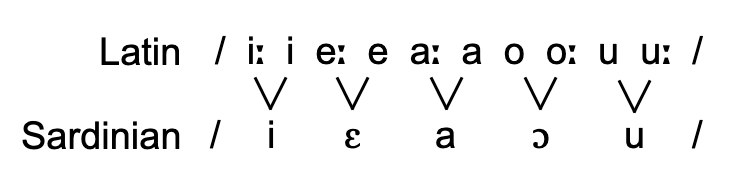
Vowel changes from Latin to early Sardinian.

== Vowels ==
All Sardinian varieties shared an original vowel system characterized by the merger of each of Latin's short vowels with its long counterpart (/i/ merged with /iː/, /u/ merged with /uː/, and so on) resulting in an inventory of five vowels: /i ɛ a ɔ u/. (Note: This development is rare among the Romance languages; nearly everywhere else Latin /i/ instead merged with /eː/, and in most areas /u/ merged with /oː/. Nevertheless, a system similar to that of Sardinian did develop in part of southern Italy, in southern Corsica, and probably also in the romanized part of North Africa. An asymmetric system—whereby /i/ merges with /eː/ on the one hand, but /u/ merges with /uː/ on the other—characterizes Eastern Romance as well as another part of southern Italy (Loporcaro 2015: 54–57).)

Sardinian vowels are lengthened under primary stress, especially in open syllables. Compare /ˈmanku/ [ˈmaˑŋˑku] and /ˈmanu/ [ˈmaːnu].

Metaphony
Orthography	Pronunciation	Orthography	Pronunciation
beni	[ˈbeni]	bene	[ˈbɛnɛ]
chelu	[ˈkelu]	chera	[ˈkɛɾa]
ghéneru	[ˈgenɛɾu]	tènere	[ˈtɛnɛɾɛ]
colli	[ˈkolli]	bona	[ˈbɔna]
obu	[ˈoβu]	domo	[ˈdɔmɔ]
códomu	[ˈkoðɔmu]	pòdere	[ˈpɔðɛɾɛ]

Sardinian vowels have long been subject to a process of metaphony whereby [ɛ ɔ] are raised to [e o] if the following syllable contains a high vowel (either /i/ or /u/). If the syllable that precedes the resulting [e] or [o] itself contains another [ɛ] or [ɔ], that vowel is also raised, a process which may repeat across multiple syllables. /fɛˈnɔmɛnu/, for instance, is realized as [feˈnoːmenu], with metaphony spreading to all three syllables preceding the final /u/.

In the Campidanese varieties spoken in the south of the island, /ɛ ɔ/ underwent a general raising to /i u/ in final syllables. (Note: Blasco Ferrer suggests that this occurred around the sixth century C.E., possibly under Byzantine influence.) The new /i u/ produced by this change failed, however, to trigger metaphony in preceding syllables, as original /i u/ had. Since this obscured the conditions for metaphony, [e o] could now contrast with [ɛ ɔ]. For instance, the older [ˈbɛːnɛ] 'well' and [ˈbeːni] 'come' became [ˈbɛːni] and [ˈbeːni] respectively, a minimal pair distinguished only by their stressed vowels. This meant that the difference between [ɛ ɔ] and [e o] had achieved phonemic status, giving Campidanese a total of seven distinct vowels, as opposed to the older five-vowel system retained by other Sardinian dialects.

Vowel phonemes in Sardinian
	Front	Central	Back
Close	i		u
Close-mid	e†		o†
Open-mid	ɛ		ɔ
Open		a	

† Allophonic except in Campidanese.

== Consonants ==
Sardinian possesses the following consonant phonemes:

		Labial	Dental	Alveolar	Retroflex	Post-alv./ Palatal	Velar
Plosive/ Affricate	voiceless	p	t	t͡s		t͡ʃ†	k
Plosive/ Affricate	voiced	b	d	d͡z	ɖ	d͡ʒ†	ɡ
Fricative	voiceless	f	θ‡	s		ʃ†	
Fricative	voiced	v†				ʒ†	
Nasal		m	n			ɲ†	
Vibrant				r			
Approximant		w†		l		j	

† Not present in Nuorese.

‡ Mainly in Nuorese.

=== Plosives ===
The Sardinian system of plosives cannot be exhaustively characterized by either qualitative (voicing) or quantitative (duration) contrasts, but both contrasts must be specified independently on some level of grammar. All plosives participate in a system-wide and complex process of lenition that characterizes all varieties of Sardinian and operates across word boundaries.

There are three series of plosives or corresponding approximants:

- Voiceless or fortis stops derive from their Latin counterparts in composition after another stop, from utterance-initial voiceless stops and from Latin geminates (typically voiceless).
  - As in most Romance languages, /p, t, k/ are unaspirated, with /t/ a dental [t̪~d̪].
  - When intervocalic, voiceless stops undergo lenition by voicing. When applicable, they escape voicing by becoming long or half-long in the opposite process of fortition; when this happens, their spelling is inconsistent, with some preferring etymological (double) spelling and others phonemic (single).
  - In Nuorese, which maintains etymologically single voiceless stops, these merge with etymologically double ones as voiceless fortis. Individual words and morphemes may display independent voicing (-tàde < Lat. -tātem) and even deletion (-àu < Lat. -ātum).
- Etymologically double and postconsonantal voiced stops do not contrast with single ones in any variety, even in Nuorese, and are typically realised as voiced geminates.
- Voiced or lenis "stops" derive from single Latin stops (voiced or voiceless), and are commonly realised as fricatives or approximants [β ð ɣ] between vowels, as in Spanish (/d/ less commonly). Latin single voiced intervocalic stops are generally reflected as zero in Logudorese and Campidanese; this can also apply across word boundaries, resulting in consonants disappearing when in combination.
- In Cagliari and neighboring dialects, the weak allophone of /d/ surfaces as [ɾ] in all positions due to rhotacism: digitus > didu~diru 'finger'.
- /ɖ/ occurs mainly in intervocalic position, where it is realized as the geminate [ɖɖ], representing the regular outcome of Latin /ll/. The same sound occurs allophonically—albeit not as a geminate—in the sequence /nd/, which is realized as [ɳɖ].
  - In some varieties, particularly in northeastern Nuorese, [ɳɖ] may assimilate to [ɳɳ]. (Note: Per Contini (1987: map 37), consistent assimilation is observed in the towns of Orune, Bitti, Santu Lussurgiu, Desulo, Tonara, Belvì, and Aritzo; while variable assimilation is observed in Onanì, Lula, Lodè, Loculi, Galtellì, Burgos, Esporlatu, Bonorva, Bonannaro, Borutta, and Monti.)

=== Fricatives ===
- Apico-alveolar realizations of /s/ predominate in the centre of the island, encompassing the entire Nuorese-speaking area and extending to Sennariolo in the west and Seulo in the south. Mura describes an apico-postalveolar or retroflex realization in the eastern parts of this region.
- /s/ voices to [z] in intervocalic position throughout the island, except in certain parts of Barbagia. Geminate /ss/ never voices.
- /θ/, derived from Latin [tj, kj] or Greek /θ/, is characteristic of the Nuorese dialects. In recent times, however, it has turned to /t/ in the towns of Nuoro and Dorgali. This may be the result of influence from Logudorese, where /t/ is the regular outcome (corjatthu < Lat. coriāceus), (thatthare < Lat. satiāre).
- /f/ is generally voiced to [v] in intervocalic position.
  - In most Nuorese varieties, word-initial /f/, if followed by a vowel, is lost. (Note: Based on similar changes in Spanish and Gascon, Blasco Ferrer (2017: 80) posits influence from a Basque-like substrate.) The exceptions are:
    - Nuoro, and areas to its northwest, where it remains as-is.
    - Orotelli, where it is realized as [ɸ~β~v].
    - Lodè, where it is realized as [β~∅].
    - Ovodda, where it is realized as [h].
- Word-initial /v/ (from Latin /w/) occurs in certain Nuorese varieties, such as those of Bitti and Lula, although the distinction between it and /b/ is not always clear. Otherwise, Sardinian has merged Latin /w/ into /b/.
- /ʃ/, written -sc(i/e)- or -sç-, is pronounced as single [ʃ] at the beginning of a word, and strengthened to [ʃʃ] otherwise.
- /ʒ/, written -x- and never phonetically long, is its voiced counterpart. However, its most common source is lenition of /d͡ʒ/.
- [v] primarily exists as the lenis allophone of /f/ and is often reflected as such: Camp. fentana 'window' < Sp. ventana. Nevertheless, in some varieties it has become a phoneme that itself exhibits a fortis allophone: Camp., Log. avesare 'to accustom'.

=== Affricates ===
- /t͡s/ is dentalized laminal [t̪͡s̪] or [t̪t̪͡s̪] written -tz-. It corresponds to Italian -z- or -ci-, the latter especially in loanwords. In contrast to /s/ it is very advanced, tending towards the interdental [θ] in central varieties, and then spelled th. Particularly in Nuorese, it represents the /t͡ʃ/ of loanwords.
- /d͡z/ is the corresponding voiced [d̪͡z̪] or [d̪d̪͡z̪], written -z-. It mainly stems from the Latin yod /j/ after consonants in Logudorese (fizu 'son' < fīlium, ghennarzu 'January' < iānuārium), but also corresponds to Italian -gi- or -ggi- in loanwords.
- /t͡ʃ/ is written -c(i/e)- or -ç-.
- /d͡ʒ/ is written -g(e/i)- or -j-. In Campidanese, it stems from the Latin yod /j/ after consonants (figiu 'son' < fīlium, gennàlgiu 'January' < iānuārium) as well as from the palatalization of Latin /ɡ/. In many varieties, this sound undergoes lenition to [ʒ] when intervocalic.

=== Nasals ===
- /m/ is variously but commonly realised as fortis (geminate) inside the stressed syllable, and for this reason (as well due to etymology) is often spelled double.
- /n/ and /nn/ is the only other consonant showing phonemic length contrast besides the rhotic.
  - Intervocalic /n/ commonly undergoes lenition in Campidanese, giving a glottal stop, pharyngeal fricative or disappearing, with vowel nasalization: Sarrabus [ˈannu ˈʔõũ] 'new year'.
- /ɲɲ/, written -gn- or -nny-/-nni- (the palatal nasal for some speakers or dialects, although for most the pronunciation is [nːj]).

=== Liquids and rhotics ===
- Sardinian has a single-rhotic system. /r/ contrasts with /rr/ intervocalically (the only such contrast besides /n/), with the former surfacing as a tap [ɾ] and the latter as a trill [r]. In other positions the trill is an allophone of the tap.
- Especially in Campidanese, intervocalic /l/ is subject to lenition both word-internally and across word boundaries, giving rise to [β w ʁ ʔ ɡʷ ʟ ∅]. Some of these realisations are written with b or u: sobi, soui 'sun'.
- /l/ is strengthened to geminate retroflex [ɭɭ] in order to escape lenition in those varieties where it is affected. It thus may freely alternate with the lenition outcomes, although strengthening is nowadays more common.
- /w/, written u, appears in Campidanese in the clusters /kw/ and /ɡw/, as in lingua 'tongue', and elsewhere in borrowings. It can also be found as the closing element in diphthongs, when these arise phonetically: pau, pàulu 'pole, stake' < pālus.

=== Labiovelars ===
- Latin /kw ɡw/ survive unchanged in Campidanese but have merged to /b(b)/ in Logudorese and Nuorese.
- Outside of the above sequences, /w/ only occurs in loanwords.

=== Processes ===
==== Neutralizations ====
Most varieties are characterised by the historic neutralization of Latin /l/ and /r/ into the archiphoneme /R/ within the morpheme: marralzu~marrarzu 'rock'. The Campidanese dialect does not generally allow this /R/ to end syllables except if followed by another /R/; as a result, underlying /R.C/ sequences are synchronically and systematically repaired, either through assimilation or metathesis:

- One strategy moves the rhotic to the leftmost available position within a phrase, sometimes jumping several syllables: /su ˈaRku/ > [ˈsɾakːu] 'the bow', but /ˈaRku/ > [ˈarku] if none is available. The intervocalic consonant that's left is regularly fortis (geminate).
- When /R/ is harmonically followed by the voiceless coronal /t/, assimilation occurs: altum > /ˈaRtu/ > [ˈatːu] 'tall'.
- When followed by the voiced coronal /d/, another type of metathesis is frequent: surdum > [ˈsuðɾu] 'deaf'.
- Recent Italian borrowings tend to maintain the coda /R/ as a function of register: It. forse > [ˈfɔrsizi] ~ [ˈfɔrt͡sizi] > [ˈfɾɔt͡ːsizi].
- In some varieties located at the north of the island, any etymological liquid in coda surfaces as a voiced lateral fricative [ɮ] or a palatal glide.
- [r] and [n] alternate in Campidanese Sardinian, but not Nuorese.

==== Lenition ====
Lenition occurs in intervocalic position. Lenition also occurs if a consonant is preceded and/ or succeeds the consonant r. Lenition occurs even across word boundaries.

Consonant	Lenition	Orthography	Pronunciation
b	β	sa baba, sos brinucos	sa βaβa, sɔɾ βɾinukɔzɔ
d	ð	sa doda, lardu, ladru	sa ðɔða, laɾðu, laðɾu
g	ɣ	su garrigu, disgrassia	su ɣariɣu, diɾɣɾasia

==== Sandhi ====
Only /s/, /n/, /r/, /t/ are permitted word-finally. The first three of these alternate in notable external sandhi processes. For Nuorese, /s/ and /r/ neutralise (merge) when in sandhi in the following way:

- Total assimilation before word-initial /l/, /n/;
- [s̺] before word-initial voiceless obstruents except /f/ and /t͡s/: tres panes [trɛs̺ ˈpanɛz̺ɛ] 'three pieces of bread', bator panes [batːɔs̺ ˈpanɛz̺ɛ] 'four pieces of bread';
- [r] before other word-initial obstruents including /t͡s/, also /j/, /m/ and /r/;
- Variable total assimilation in allegro speech before word-initial /f/.
- Parallel outcomes occur word-internally with the prefixes dis-, is-.

Coda	Initial	Result	Orthography	Example
n	f	f	non facas	no ffacas
n	l	l	non lasses	no llasses
n	r	r	non rugas	no rrugas
n	s	s	non sias	no ssias
n	b	m	chin babbu	chim babbu
n	m	m	in mesu	im mesu
n	p	m	non piches	nom piches
n	/k/	/ŋ/	in chelu	
n	/g/	/ŋ/	non galu	
s / r *	l	l	tres/ bator litros	tre/ batto llitros
s / r *	n	n	tres/ bator nuches	tre/ bato nnuches
s / r *	s	s	tres/ bator santos	tres/ batos santos
s / r *	c	s	tres/ bator canes	tres/ batos canes
s / r *	p	s	tres/ bator panes	tres/ batos panes
s / r *	t	s	tres/ bator taulas	tres/ batos taulas
s / r *	th	s	tres/ bator thithulas	tres/ batos thithulas
s / r *	r	r	tres/ bator rosas	trer/ bator rosas
s / r *	g	r	tres/ bator gatos	trer/ bator gatos
s / r *	b	r	tres/ bator boes	trer/ bator boes
s / r *	d	r	tres/ bator domos	trer/ bator domos
s / r *	j	r	tres/ bator jannas	trer/ bator jannas
s / r *	m	r	tres/ bator manos	trer/ bator manos
s / r *	z	r	tres/ bator ziros	trer/ bator ziros
s / r *	tz	r	tres/ bator tzecos	trer/ bator tzecos
s / r *	f	r	tres/ bator fizos	trer/ bator fizos

- Also applies to the word est. Example: est bellu is pronounced er bellu.

The word-final /t/ is assimilated to the following consonant within a phrase, or can be said to disappear, inducing strengthening: Log. cheret bennere [ˈkɛrɛ bˈbɛnnɛrɛ] '(s)he wants to come'.

Special cases:

- The final n of the clauses chin and in requires a d (nd together are pronounced ɳɖ) in front of the initial vowel of the indefinite article: chin/in unu/una is pronounced chind/ind unu/una.
- While all the other final consonants always remain intact before the vowel of the following words, the "n" of the negative particle "non" drops (without undergoing elision): no andes! no essas! no istes! no orrjes! no umpras!

==== Morphosyntactic gemination ====
Unlike Tuscan Italian, Neapolitan and Sicilian, Sardinian doesn't have a productive process of syntactic gemination since most Latin final consonants have been maintained. Nevertheless, there are a few lexical items that formerly ended in consonants, and thus prevented initial-consonant weakening (lenition); as a result, consonants occurring after these words undergo strengthening, typically by gemination.

- NE ← (Latin) NEC = né (conjunction): ne ddormo ne ppaso
- CHE ← (Latin) QUO+ET = come (comparative): che mmacu
- TRA ← (Italian) TRA = tra (preposition)
- A ← (Latin) AC = (comparative)
- A ← (Latin) AD = a (preposition): a ddomo
- A ← (Latin) AUT = (interrogative): a bbenis?
- E ← (Latin) ET = e (conjunction): sapios e mmacos

=== Comparison with other languages ===
Several features distinguish Sardinian, although not necessarily all its dialects, from other Romance varieties.

- Preservation of the plosive sounds /k/ and /ɡ/ before front vowels /e/ and /i/; for example, centum > chentu 'hundred'; decem > dèche 'ten' and gener > ghèneru 'son-in-law' (Italian cento, dieci, genero with /t͡ʃ/ and /d͡ʒ/). This is another strikingly archaic feature that was shared by African Romance.
  - /t͡ʃ/ and /d͡ʒ/ have since been introduced to Logudorese via borrowing from other dialects and external languages, but generally not Nuorese, where these are reflected as /t͡s/ and /d͡z/.
- Absence of diphthongizations found in many other Romance languages; for example, potest > podet '(s)he can' (Italian può, Spanish puede, Romanian poate); bonus > bónu 'good' (Italian buono, Spanish bueno). This is shared by several Central-Southern Italian varieties, with many displaying various types of metaphony reminiscent of Sardinian.

Sardinian contains the following phonetic innovations:

- Change of the Latin -ll- into a retroflex [ɖɖ], shared with Sicilian, Southern Corsican as well as historically in Gascon; for example, corallus > coraddu 'coral' and villa > bidda 'village, town'.
- Latin lj changed into /ld͡z/, /ll/, /d͡z/, /t͡s/, /d͡ʒ/ or /ʒ/ rather than the palatal /ʎ/ of Italian: *voliam > bolla ~ bolza ~ boza 'wish, longing' (Italian voglia); fīlium > fillu ~ fizu ~ fitzu~ figiu ~ fixu 'son' (Italian figlio).
- Various outcomes of initial pl-, fl- and cl-, commonly as [pr], [fr], [kr], variously seen also in Portuguese and Galician; for example, plateam > pratza 'public square' (Portuguese praça, Galician praza; but Italian piazza), flŭxum > frúsciu 'flabby' (Portuguese and Galician frouxo) and the early Church Latin borrowing ecclēsiam > crèsia 'church' (Portuguese igreja, Galician igrexa; but Italian chiesa).
- But also [pj], [fj], [t͡ʃ] in both Logudorese ciae (alongside crae) and Old Galician-Portuguese chave < clāvem 'key'; contrast Italian chiave, with [kj].
- A small area on the Nuorese territory conserves Latin /Cl/: flùmene alongside fiùmene, frùmine < flūmen for all three possible outcomes.
- Metathesis as in abbratzare > abbaltzare 'to hug, to embrace'. In word-initial position, it can produce marked syllable onsets such as [s̺r], [mr], [t͡ʃr], [d͡ʒr], e.g. ianuarius > jrennazu (Campidanese) 'January'.
- Vowel prothesis before an initial r in Campidanese, similar to Basque and Gascon: rēx > (g)urrèi/re 'king' (Basque errege); rota > arroda 'wheel' (Gascon arròda, Basque errota); rīvus > Sardinian and Gascon arríu 'river'.
- Vowel prothesis in Logudorese before an initial s followed by consonant, as in the Western Romance languages: scrīptum > iscrítu 'written' (Spanish escrito, French écrit), stēlla > isteddu 'star' (Spanish estrella, French étoile)
- Except for the Nuorese dialect, intervocalic Latin single voiceless plosives /p/, /t/, /k/ became voiced approximant consonants. Single voiced plosives /b/, /d/, /ɡ/ were lost: caritātem (acc.) > caridàde [kaɾiˈðaːðe], [kaɾiˈdaːde] (Italian carità), locus > lóːgu [ˈloːɣu], [ˈloːɡu] (Italian luogo). This also applies across word boundaries: porcu 'pig', but su porcu [su ˈβorku] 'the pig'; tempus 'time', but su tempus [su ˈðempuzu] 'the time'; domu 'house', but sa 'omu 'the house'.
- All varieties show paragogic vowels: the vowel of the final syllable ending in a consonant is copied after it to form a new open syllable, which undergoes the usual lenition (voicing) processes: Log. istranzos [isˈtran.d͡zɔ.zɔ] / Camp. strangius [ˈstran.d͡ʒu.zu] 'strangers'. This is only present before pause, and may be variable with some speakers.
  - After resonants, this vowel is sometimes etymological and sometimes not, leading to variation in spelling: Nuo. nùmen(e) 'name' < nōmen; fàcher(e) 'to do' < facere. Note that the vowel is non-phonemic (paragogic) in both cases: it disappears when not utterance-final, and the /r/ of the infinitive undergoes regular sandhi: fàcher(e) cùrrer(e) [fakɛs̺ ˈkurːɛɾɛ] 'to make run'.
  - A similar epenthetic vowel has been lexicalized in most varieties in monosyllables: Camp. tui 'you' < tū.
- Logudorese and Nuorese display vowel insertion before initial /sC/ clusters, less typical of Campidanese (examples above); the latter displays it before word-initial /r/: Camp. arrùbiu, Log. rùbiu < rubeum 'reddish'.

== Bibliography ==
- Blasco Ferrer, Eduardo. 2017. Il latino e la romanizzazione. In Blasco Ferrer, Eduardo; Koch, Peter; Marzo; Daniela (eds.), Manuale di linguistica sarda, 85–103. Berlin: De Gruyter.
- Contini, Michele. 1987. Etude de géographie phonétique et de phonétique instrumentale du sarde. Alessandria: Edizioni dell'Orso.
- Jones, Michael A. 1988. Sardinian. In Harris, Martin; Vincent, Nigel (eds.), The Romance languages, 314–350. London: Routledge.
- Jones, Michael A. 1997. Sardinia. In Maiden, Martin; Mair, Parry, (eds.), The dialects of Italy, 376–384. London: Routledge.
- Loporcaro, Michele. 2015. Vowel length from Latin to Romance. Oxford University Press.
- Mensching, Guido; Remberger, Eva-Maria. 2016. Sardinian. In Ledgeway, Adam & Maiden, Martin (eds.), The Oxford guide to the Romance languages, 270–291. Oxford University Press.
- Mura, Riccardo; Virdis, Maurizio. 2015. Caratteri e strutture fonetiche, fonologiche e prosodiche della lingua sarda. Cagliari: Condaghes.
- Pittau, Massimo. 1972. Grammatica del sardo-nuorese: Il più conservativo dei parlari neolatini. Bologna: Pàtron.
- Wagner, Max Leopold. 1951. La lingua sarda: Storia, spirito e forma. Berne: Francke.
