= Michel Contini =

- Born: 1937 (age 88–89); Cagliari, Sardinia, Italy
- Other names: Micheli Còntini; Michele Contini
- Education: University of Grenoble
- Occupations: linguist; researcher; academic
- Employers: French National Centre for Scientific Research; Stendhal University; Istituto Poligrafico e Zecca dello Stato; UNESCO
- Notable work: Étude de géographie phonétique et de phonétique instrumentale du sarde (1987); Atlas Linguistique Roman (ALIR); Atlas Linguarum Europae (ALE)

Michel Contini (French: [miʃɛl kɔ̃tini]; Sardinian: Micheli Còntini [miˈkɛli ˈɣontini]; Italian: Michele Contini [miˈkɛːle ˈkɔntini]; born 1937) is a Sardinian-born naturalized French linguist, researcher and academic.

== Biography ==
Born in Cagliari, Sardinia, he completed elementary school in Oristano, middle school in Cagliari, and obtained a scientific high school diploma in Sassari.

In 1958 he began living in Grenoble, France, where he graduated in Languages in 1964, obtaining the French citizenship in 1965.

After graduating, he began to publish his first studies about the Sardinian language, during his doctorate. The first one, published for the 3rd-cycle Doctorate, was a phonetic and phonological study of the dialect of Nughedu San Nicolò, and he later made many other ones during his three years of work (1967-1970) as a researcher at the CNRS, studying Sardinian, French and Italian.

Regarding Sardinian, his studies have come to analyze the variants of 214 Sardinian languages, and thanks to this work he obtained the State Doctorate (Strasbourg, 1983) with his thesis Étude de géographie phonétique et de phonétique instrumentale du sarde (Study of phonetic geography and instrumental phonetics of Sardinian), published in 1987 by the publisher Edizioni dell'Orso.

Later, he became full professor of Geolinguistics and Phonetics and Director of the Center for Dialectology at the Stendhal University of Grenoble, and became director of the European Project for the Romance Linguistic Atlas of the State Mint and Polygraphic Institute of Rome, a collaborative project of 85 universities and 31 researchers from all over the Romance-speaking countries.

In 2006 he was part of the commission for the creation of the Limba Sarda Comuna, together with Giulio Angioni, Roberto Bolognesi, Manlio Brigaglia, Diego Corràine, Giovanni Lupinu, Anna Oppo, Giulio Paulis, Maria Teresa Pinna Catte and Mario Puddu, and since then he has always declared himself in favor of its use, considering the use of a single orthography tas something necessary to save the language from extinction. In 2011 he started working at the ALiMuS, Multimedia Linguistic Atlas of Sardinia, a work that was stopped in 2014.

Following his retirement, he continued to work on the Atlas Linguistique Roman (ALIR) and the Atlas Linguarum Europae (ALE).

== Publications ==
This is a partial list of Michel Contini's publications during the years. It does not include most of them.

- Contini, Michel (1971). Description phonétique et phonologique du parler logoudorien de Nughedu S. Nicolò (Sardaigne) (in French). Université de Grenoble - Faculté des Lettres et Sciences Humaines. OCLC 490343855.
- Contini, Michel (1970). Apporto della moderna fonetica sperimentale alla dialettologia: ricerche sul sardo (in Italian). OCLC 963185837.
- Contini, Michel; Tuttle, Edward F. (1982). "Sardinian". In Rebecca Posner (ed.). Trends in Romance Linguistics and Philology: Volume 3: Language and Philology in Romance. Berlin: De Gruyter. ISBN 978-3-11-175006-4. OCLC 853269137.
- Contini, Michel (1987). Étude de géographie phonétique et de phonétique instrumentale du Sarde : atlas et album phonétique (in French). Alessandria: Edizioni dell'Orso. ISBN 978-88-7694-015-6. OCLC 493271003.
- Contini, Michel (2010). "Les phonosymbolismes : continuité d'une motivation primaire ?". L'Ordre des mots en français (in French). 59 (2): 77–103. doi:10.3917/tl.059.0077. ISSN 0082-6049.
- Contini, Michel (1993). Parlare e scrivere il sardo: la lingua della Sardegna raccontata ai ragazzi (in Italian). Tàtari: Editrice democratica sarda. OCLC 32346631.
- Contini, Michel (2000). "Un sarde unitaire? la parole est aux isophones..." Јужнословенски филолог. 56 (1–2): 529–542. OCLC 1132586280.
- Contini, Michel (2002). La géolinguistique en Amérique latine (in French). Grenoble: Université Stendhal-Grenoble 3, Centre de Dialectologie. ISBN 9782951642508. OCLC 948386071.
- Contini, Michel; Tuaillon, Gaston; Université Stendhal (Grenoble) (1996). Atlas linguistique Roman: ALiR (in French). Roma: Istituto poligrafico e zecca dello stato : Libreria dello stato. OCLC 926810042.
- Contini, Michel; Lai, Jean-Pierre; Romano, Antonio (2002). "La Géolinguistique À Grenoble : De l'AliR À AMPER". Revue Belge de Philologie et d'Histoire (in French). 80 (3): 931–941. doi:10.3406/rbph.2002.4647.
- Contini, Michel (2006). "Une frontiere oubliee en domaine sarde?". Quaderni di Semantica (in French) (1): 183. ISSN 0393-1226.
- Contini, Michel; Lai, Jean-Pierre; Romano, Antonio (2005). "L'intonation des Variétés Dialectales de l'Espace Roman". Communication and Cognition. Studies in Language (in French). 9: 69–80.
- Contini, Michel (2009). "La Sardaigne: situation linguistique. Rapports internes et externes, hier et aujourd'hui". Conférence Internationale les langues et les cultures en contact. Autrefois et aujourd'hui (in French). Akademia Polonijna: 43–63.
- Contini, Michel (2012). La géolinguistique romane: de Gilliéron aux atlas multimédia (in French). EDUFBA. pp. 453–480.
- Contini, Michel (2014). "Le Catalan dans les parlers sardes". Estudis Romànics (in French). 36: 405–421. OCLC 1248982211.
- Contini, Michel (2014). La motivazione semantica nelle carte linguistiche (in Italian). OCLC 989956860.
- Contini, Michel (2015). La géographie linguistique au Brésil (in French). ISBN 978-2-84310-317-9. OCLC 1041332702.
- Contini, Michel (2015). "Normaliser le sarde : une chance de survie". In Stella Medori (ed.). Paroddi varghji : mélanges offerts à Marie-Josée Dalbera-Stefanaggi (in French). Alessandria: Edizioni dell'Orso. pp. 75–90. ISBN 978-88-6274-597-0. OCLC 926100579.
