= Sardinian dialects =

Sardinian dialects may refer to any of the following linguistic varieties of the Sardinian language, broadly divided into two subgroups:

- the North-Central dialects, employing the Logudorese orthography;
- the South-Central dialects, employing the Campidanese orthography.

Some other varieties spoken in Northern Sardinia, while more related to Corsican rather than Sardinian, are also often considered Sardinian dialects:

- the Gallurese varieties;
- the Sassarese varieties.
