= Henry Drucker =

American political scientist and fund-raiser

- Born: Henry Matthew Drucker; 29 April 1942; Paterson, New Jersey, US
- Died: 30 October 2002 (aged 60); London, England
- Known for: The Political Uses of Ideology (1974); Doctrine and Ethos in the Labour Party (1979); Developments in British Politics (1983)
- Spouse: Nancy Newman (m. 1975)

Academic background
- Education: Allegheny College (BA); London School of Economics (PhD)
- Thesis: The Concept of Ideology (1967)
- Doctoral advisor: Maurice Cranston

Academic work
- Institutions: University of Edinburgh; University of Oxford
- Notable students: John Holloway; Luis Moreno Fernández

Henry Matthew Drucker (29 April 1942 – 30 October 2002) was an American political scientist and university fund-raiser, who spent the entirety of his professional career in the United Kingdom. An expert on the Labour Party, he was an associate of several Labour politicians, including the future British Prime Minister Gordon Brown.

== Background ==
Henry Drucker was born in Paterson, New Jersey, the son of Arthur Drucker and his wife Frances. He grew up in Rutherford, where his father owned a department store, and attended Rutherford High School. Drucker studied for a BA in philosophy at Allegheny College in Meadville, Pennsylvania, where he was the student government president. Upon receiving his degree he moved to the United Kingdom to begin postgraduate research under the supervision of Maurice Cranston at the London School of Economics, graduating in 1967 with a PhD in political philosophy.

== Academic career ==
Spurning the opportunity to return to the United States, Drucker was appointed as a lecturer in politics at the University of Edinburgh in the same year he completed his doctorate. At that time, the politics department at Edinburgh was small in terms of both personnel and student numbers, and he became its main authority on British electoral politics. Drucker's lectures were well attended and he was noted for introducing new teaching techniques, such as leading groups of students on reconnaissance missions during important parliamentary by-elections to gather on-the-spot data and meet party campaigners. In the 1970s and early 1980s he was also a regular commentator on BBC Scotland's election night television programmes, where his Scots-inflected American accent and mutton-chop whiskers distinguished him from his fellow guests.

Drucker's first published work was The Political Uses of Ideology (1974), an adaptation of his PhD thesis, which examined Marx's concept of ideology and contrasted it with how certain notions of the term are themselves used by ideological actors in the modern era. Drucker's preoccupation with political theory continued with the publication of what was to become arguably his most celebrated book, Doctrine and Ethos in the Labour Party (1979), which advanced the idea that "ideology" in the context of the Labour Party has two elements – "doctrine", which refers to the party's programme, and "ethos", which Drucker uses to describe its popular, spiritual dimension. Drucker concluded that both of these elements are necessary for the propagation of Labour's core values, but that ethos is especially important for understanding the party's stories and myths, its appreciation (and veneration) of its past, its relationship with the trade unions, and above all its latent conservatism, which in Drucker's evaluation has prevented it from becoming the party of the future that progressive-minded modernisers wish it to be.

Most of Drucker's other works concentrated on the contemporary British political situation. Having arrived at Edinburgh at a time when politics in Scotland was in a state of flux, many of his early publications – such as Our Changing Scotland (1977; edited with Michael Clarke) and Breakaway: The Scottish Labour Party (1978) – analysed events taking place north of the border. Enthusiastic about the Labour Government's proposals for Scottish devolution, in 1976 he and his wife Nancy established the Unit for the Study of Government in Scotland, and from 1979 to 1982 they edited three successive editions of The Scottish Government Yearbook, which subsequently became the journal Scottish Affairs. Widening his scope, in 1983 Drucker devised and edited the first edition of Developments in British Politics, intending it as a general textbook for undergraduate students; it has since been updated several times, and by 2002 had sold over a million copies.

== University fund-raising ==
Drucker hoped that he would advance to the professorial chair of politics at Edinburgh following the death of its incumbent, John P. Mackintosh, in 1978. Instead, he was overlooked in favour of Malcolm Anderson, and although he was made a senior lecturer the year after Mackintosh's death further promotion was not forthcoming. Seeking fulfilment elsewhere, by the mid-1980s he had become acting director of the university's development office, and in 1986 he was recruited by the University of Oxford to be its new director of development. Arriving the following year, Drucker was initially installed in a small room in the university's Agricultural Economics Unit, with only two desks and a filing cabinet as furnishings. There was, The Times later reported, "no plan, no database, no alumni magazine, and [Drucker] had no volunteers." All of these were serious shortcomings: the university was at that time facing a "severe financial crisis", and without even a database of alumni (due in no small part to its collegiate structure) it was difficult to envisage how it could emulate its American Ivy League rivals in raising the amount of money it needed from donations.

In response, Drucker and the university's vice-chancellor, Sir Patrick Neill, launched the Campaign for Oxford in 1988, with the aim of raising £220 million in five years. In fact, the total sum raised by 1994 was £341 million. Jeremy Paxman, in his book Friends in High Places: Who Runs Britain? (1991), described the publicity surrounding the Campaign's launch, which focused on showcasing the participation of high-profile alumni:

In October 1988, an unlikely waggonload of well-lunched worthies descended on the university to launch the appeal, in a train donated for the day by British Rail. They included the Archbishop of Canterbury, three dukes (Norfolk, Wellington and Atholl, all Oxford graduates), and numerous politicians, including the former prime minister, Lord Home... It was as reasonable a cross-section of the Great and Good as could be gathered together."

The Campaign's "biggest coup", argued Sue Cameron in the Financial Times, was persuading the Syrian-born businessman Wafic Saïd to disburse £20 million for the foundation of Saïd Business School. Despite its success, however, Drucker's reputation in Oxford was not necessarily positive: reservations about "American" methods of fund-raising, together with a common belief that his public pronouncements went beyond his remit, made him an "outsider" among the university's dons.

By 1993 the development office had a staff of 60 and a vastly increased budget. That same year, Drucker resigned from the university and established his own consultancy, Oxford Philanthropic. As well as assisting clients in raising funds, his main objective was to "advise donors on how to make strategic philanthropic investment." He was particularly influenced by the notion of venture philanthropy, and attracted several charities and public bodies as clients. In 1999 he retired as the consultancy's managing director, taking up a less active role as chairman instead.

== Political activity ==
Drucker's association with the Labour Party was personal as well as professional, and he made no secret of his commitment to it; Martin Clark, a colleague in Edinburgh's politics department, remembered him as "very much a Labour man." For much of his time in Scotland he was firstly a member and then chairman of Edinburgh Central constituency Labour Party (CLP), working alongside the constituency's then MPs, Tom Oswald and Robin Cook. Drucker was perhaps better known, however, for his friendship with the young Gordon Brown, whom he later recalled (in an interview with Brown's biographer, Paul Routledge) as "hugely popular, a natural politician: totally self-assured... He was a bit like a Bill Clinton figure." In 1980, he and Brown co-authored The Politics of Nationalism and Devolution, which sought to establish a blueprint for future party policy on devolution and the constitution in the aftermath of the failed referendum on a Scottish Assembly. Christopher Harvie has since claimed that Drucker and Brown parted ways following the book's publication, as the latter grew increasingly sceptical of Drucker's pluralist-minded arguments in favour of proportional representation and electoral coalitions.

It was Drucker's continuing support for Labour, alongside his fund-raising expertise, that led to him being appointed by the party in 1996 to raise money for its general election campaign the following year. This was not a happy experience, however, and he only lasted in this role for three months. Drucker was particularly dismayed by the party's use of a blind trust (i.e., anonymous donations) to fund Tony Blair's private office, and an argument over the use of this trust with prominent party donor Michael Levy at the latter's home allegedly prompted him to resign immediately. A year later, at the Neill Committee inquiry into party political funding, Drucker presented a report on the use of blind trusts, memorably describing them to the committee as an "evil device" and arguing that no donors would have given money to Labour "unless there were enough nods and winks that Tony was, of course, very grateful, and that they were assured this was the case." Levy retorted that Drucker had written a funding presentation for the party so "ridiculously thin" that his contract had been terminated, which Levy alleged had motivated Drucker to attack Blair and the party's new donors as an act of revenge. John Rentoul, Blair's biographer, noted there was a strong "personality clash" between Levy and Drucker which may have "sharpened" the latter's criticisms, but concluded that "Drucker was right, and Blair was forced effectively to admit as much when the blind trust was wound up at the end of 1996."

== Personal life and death ==
Drucker was married from 1975 until his death to Nancy Livia Newman, a fellow lecturer at the University of Edinburgh and the daughter of NBC newscaster Edwin Newman. They had no children.

Drucker suffered increasing health problems throughout his final decade, and two heart bypass operations encouraged him to scale down his professional activities. It was while attending a meeting at the offices of the housing charity Shelter on 30 October 2002 that he suffered a cardiac arrest, dying shortly thereafter at the Royal London Hospital. He is buried at Wolvercote Cemetery in Oxford. Nancy Drucker died in Oxford in 2020.

== Sources ==
- Drucker, H. M., The Political Uses of Ideology (London: Macmillan, 1974). ISBN 0333154819
- Drucker, H. M., Breakaway: The Scottish Labour Party (Edinburgh: EUSPB, 1978). ISBN 090491920X
- Drucker, H. M., Doctrine and Ethos in the Labour Party (London: George Allen and Unwin, 1979). ISBN 0043290264
- Drucker, H. M. and Gordon Brown, The Politics of Nationalism and Devolution (London: Longman, 1980). ISBN 9780582295209
- Drucker, H. M., 'The Influence of the Trade Unions on the Ethos of the Labour Party', in Ben Pimlott and Chris Cook (eds), Trade Unions in British Politics (London: Longman, 1982), pp. 259–72. ISBN 0582491843
- Edinburgh University Politics Group, 'Learning to Fight Multi-Party Elections: The Lessons of Hillhead', Parliamentary Affairs, 35 (1982), pp. 252–66.
- Harvie, Christopher, Broonland: the Last Days of Gordon Brown (London: Verso, 2010). ISBN 9781844674398
- Hassan, Gerry, 'Don't Mess with the Missionary Man: Brown, Moral Compasses and the Road to Britishness', in Andrew Gamble and Anthony Wright (eds), Britishness: Perspectives on the Britishness Question (Chichester: John Wiley and Sons, 2009), pp. 86–100. ISBN 9781405192699
- Levy, Michael, A Question of Honour (London: Simon & Schuster, 2008). ISBN 9781847373151
- Paxman, Jeremy, Friends in High Places: Who Runs Britain? (Harmondsworth: Penguin, 1991). ISBN 9780140157697
- Pellew, Jill, "Drucker, Henry Matthew (1942–2002)", Oxford Dictionary of National Biography (Oxford: Oxford University Press, 2006).
- Rentoul, John, Tony Blair, Prime Minister (London: Little, Brown, 2001) ISBN 9780316854962
- Routledge, Paul, Gordon Brown: the Biography (London: Simon & Schuster, 1998). ISBN 0684819546
- Russell, Meg, Building New Labour: the Politics of Party Organisation (Basingstoke: Palgrave Macmillan, 2005). ISBN 1403939942
