= Sardinians =

People from (or residents of) Sardinia

Sardinians / Sards
Sardus / Sardos (Sardinian) Saldi (Gallurese) Sardi (Italian)
- Flag of Sardinia

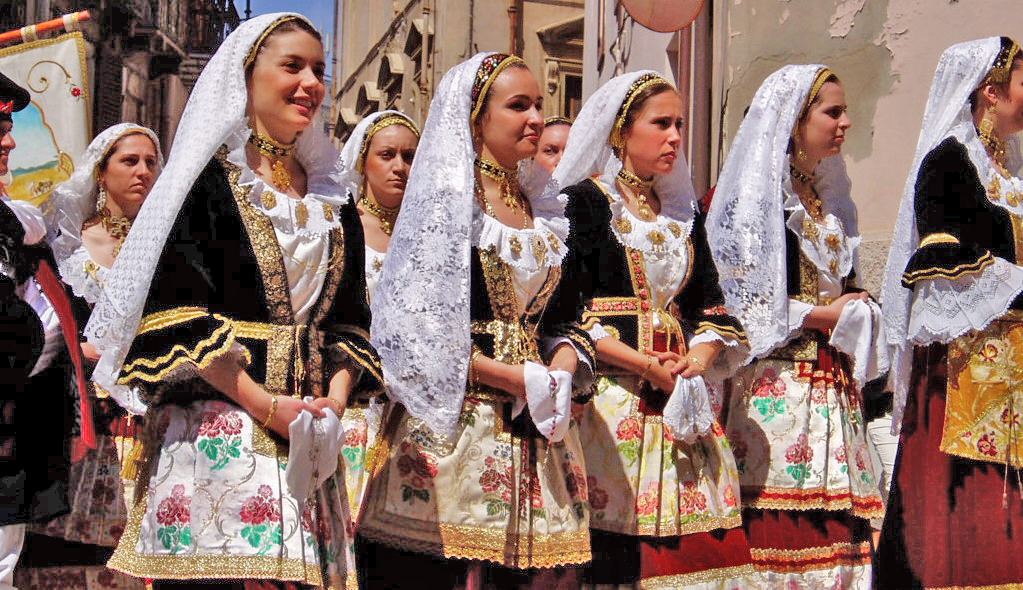
- Sardinian women in traditional attire

Regions with significant populations
- Sardinia 1,661,521 (Inhabitants of Sardinia inclusive of all ethnicities)
- 2,250,000 (outside Sardinia)

Languages
- Native; Sardinian, Sassarese, Gallurese, Tabarchino; Primarily; Italian (Note: Italian was first officially introduced in the late 18th century and then spread as a result of a language shift; Italian is now usually spoken either in the standard variety with a Sardinian accent or more commonly in a regional variety.)

Religion
- Predominantly Roman Catholicism

Related ethnic groups
- Italians; Corsicans; Spaniards; Basques; Catalans

Sardinians or Sards (Note: Sardinian: sardos or sardus; Italian and Sassarese: sardi; Gallurese: saldi.) are a Romance ethnolinguistic group indigenous to Sardinia, (Note: Sources:) an island in the western Mediterranean administered as an autonomous region of Italy. They number roughly 1.5 million on their native island, with another 2.25 million residing abroad, mostly on the Italian mainland.

Sardinians are characterized by their relative cultural, linguistic, and ethnic isolation from other groups in the Mediterranean basin; their demographic history reflects the highest detected levels of genetic similarity to ancient Neolithic peoples who expanded into Europe around 7,500 to 8,000 years ago.

Although Italian is now their primary language, most Sardinians also speak their native tongue, Sardinian, a Romance language that is most similar to the Vulgar Latin introduced by the Romans in the mid third century BCE. Other native languages are Sassarese, which is rooted in the medieval Tuscan dialect; Gallurese, which is closely related to Corsican; and Tabarchino, a dialect of Ligurian (Genoese).

== Etymology ==
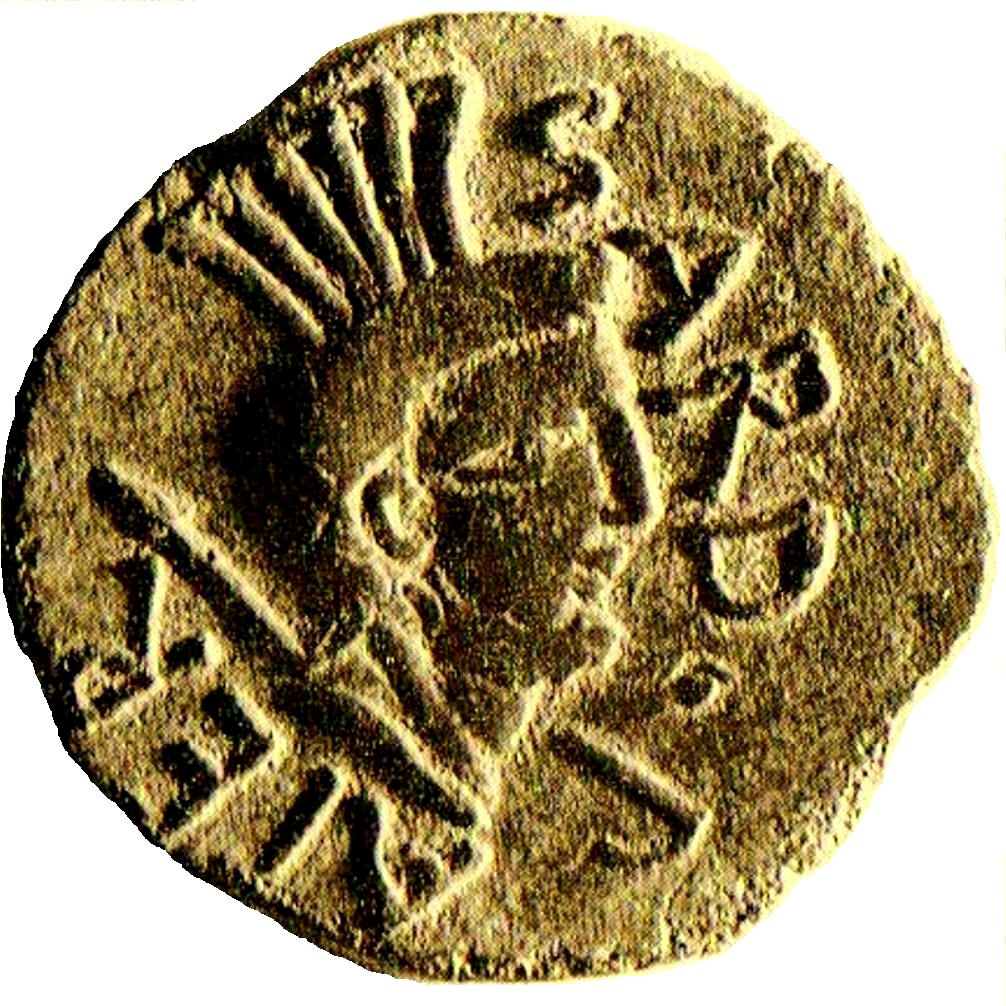
Depiction of the Sardus Pater Babai in a Roman coin (59 B.C.)

Not much can be gathered from the classical literature about the origins of the Sardinian people. The ethnonym "S(a)rd" may belong to the Pre-Indo-European (or Indo-European) linguistic substratum, and whilst they might have derived from the Iberians, the accounts of the old authors differ greatly in this respect. The oldest written attestation of the ethnonym is on the Nora stone, where the word Šrdn (Shardan) bears witness to its original existence by the time the Phoenician merchants first arrived on Sardinian shores. According to Timaeus, one of Plato's dialogues, Sardinia and its people as well, the "Sardonioi" or "Sardianoi" (Σαρδονιοί or Σαρδιανοί), might have been named after "Sardo" (Σαρδώ), a legendary Lydian woman from Sardis (Σάρδεις), in the region of western Anatolia (now Turkey). Some other authors, like Pausanias and Sallust, reported instead that the Sardinians traced their descent back to a mythical ancestor, a Libyan son of Hercules or Makeris (related either to the Berber verb Imɣur "to grow", to the specific Kabyle word Maqqur "He is the greatest", or also associated with the figure of Melqart) revered as a deity going by Sardus Pater Babai ("Sardinian Father" or "Father of the Sardinians"), who gave the island its name. It has also been claimed that the ancient Nuragic Sards were associated with the Sherden (šrdn in Egyptian), one of the Sea Peoples. The ethnonym was then romanised, with regard for the singular masculine and feminine form, as sardus and sarda.

== History ==
=== Prehistory ===
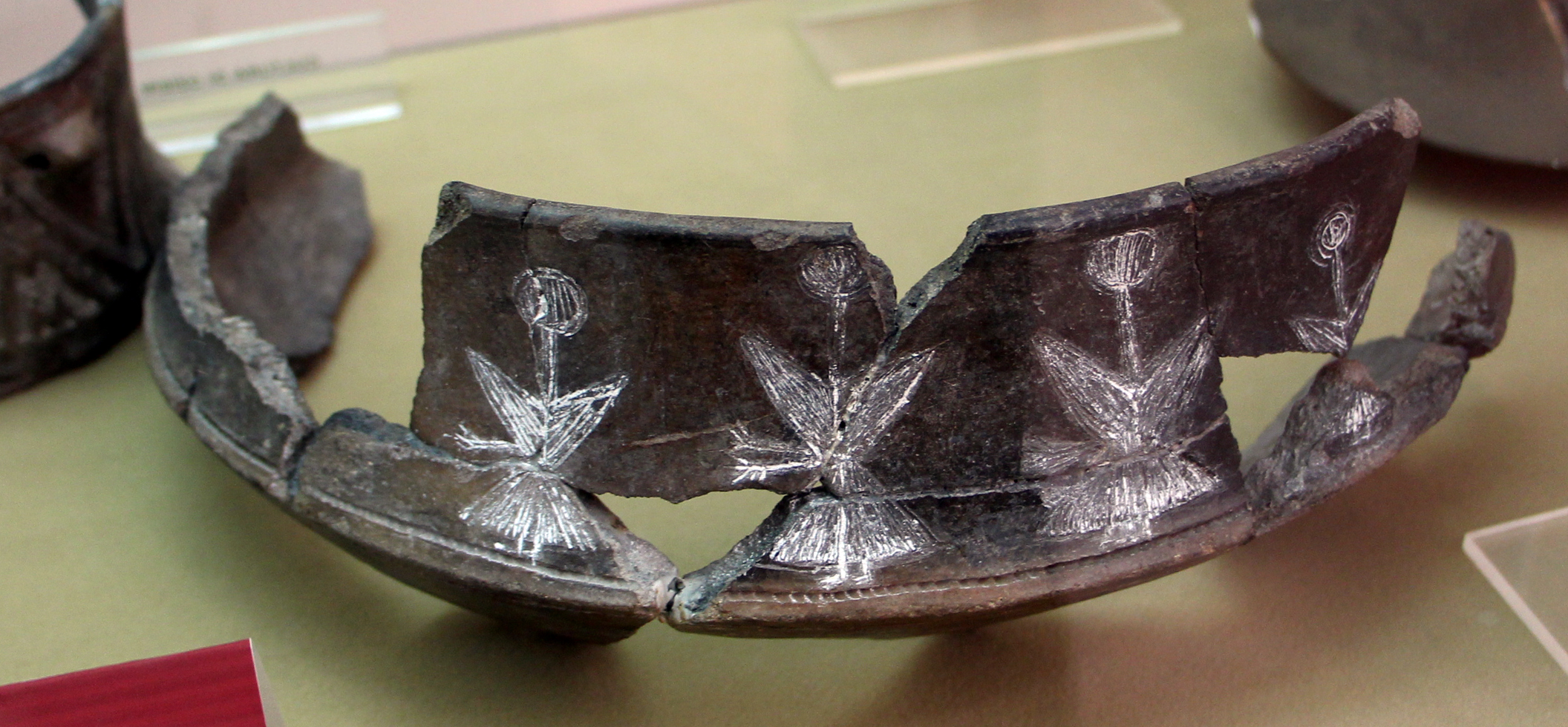
Fragment of pottery with human figures, Ozieri culture

Sardinia was first settled by modern humans from continental Europe during the Upper Paleolithic and the Mesolithic; at the time Sardinia and Corsica formed a single island, the largest in the Mediterranean, separated from the Italian Peninsula by a short stretch of sea. During the Neolithic, Early European Farmers settled in Sardinia. According to modern archaeogenetic investigations, the Neolithic Sardinians showed a greater affinity with the Cardial populations of Iberia and Southern France, furthermore mitochondrial haplogroups of the ancient Mesolithic inhabitants would survive in today's Sardinians.

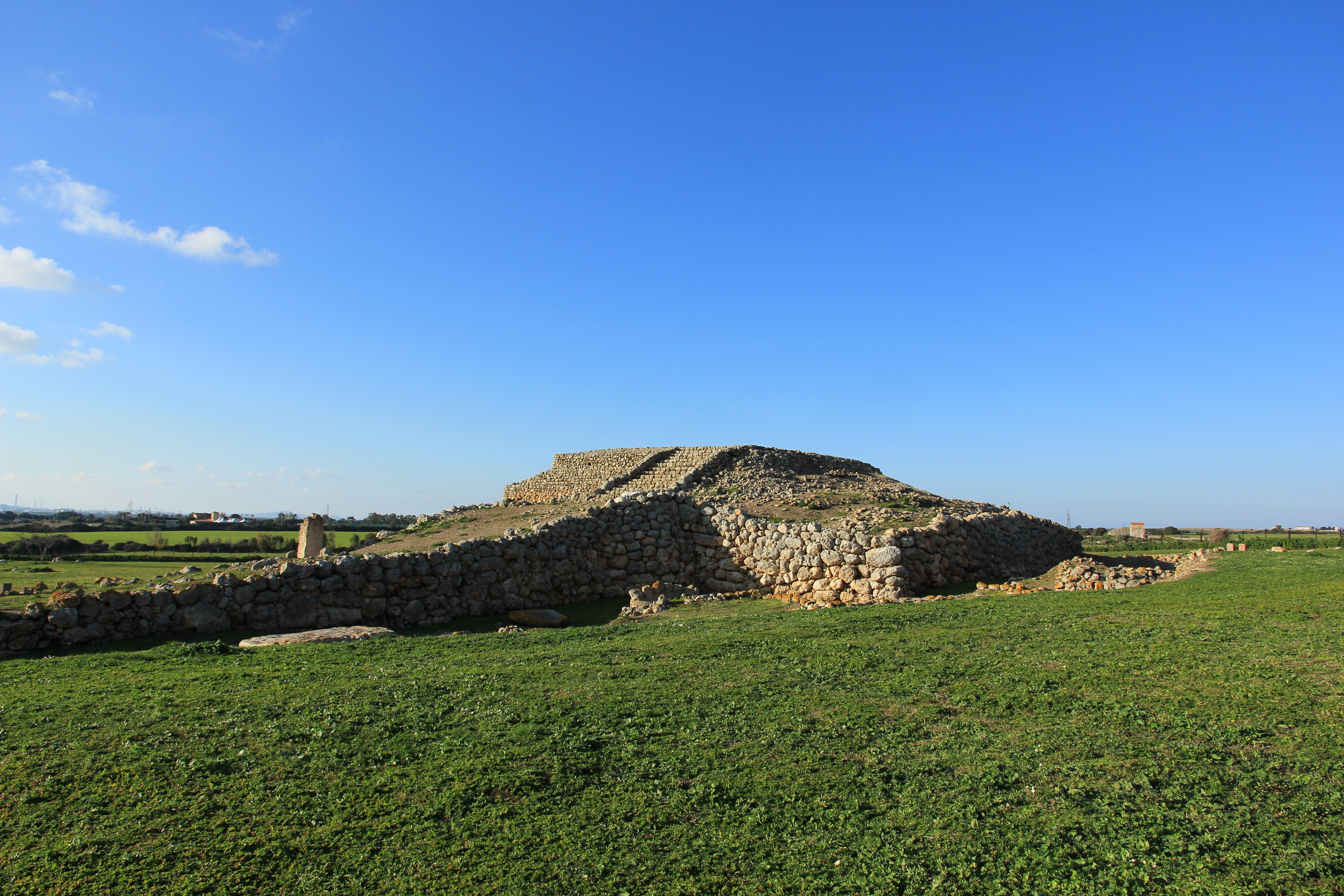
Megalithic altar of Monte d'Accoddi, erected by the Pre-Nuragic Sardinians from the Ozieri and Abealzu-Filigosa culture.

In the Late Chalcolithic to the Early Bronze Age, the Bell Beaker culture from Southern France, Northeastern Spain, and then Central Europe entered the island, bringing new metallurgical techniques and ceramic styles and probably Indo-European languages. An early modest gene flow of the Western Steppe Herders has been dated to about this period (~2600 BCE).

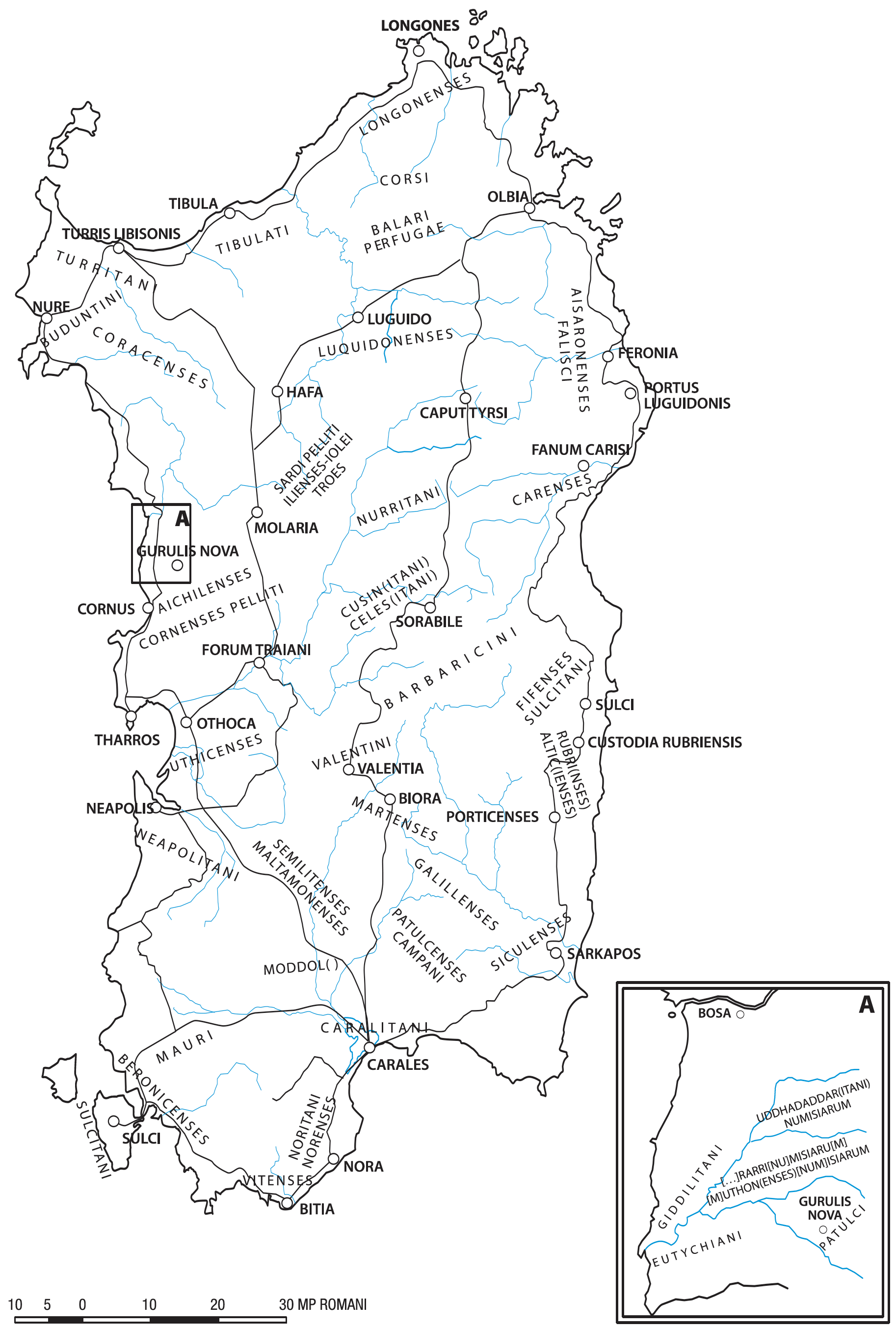
Composition of the Nuraghic tribes described by the Romans.

==== Nuragic civilization ====
The Nuragic civilization arose in the Middle Bronze Age, during the Late Bonnanaro culture, which showed connections with the previous Beaker culture and the Polada culture of northern Italy. Although the Sardinians were considered to have acquired a sense of national identity, at that time, the grand tribal identities of the Nuragic Sardinians were said to be three (roughly from the South to the North): the Iolei/Ilienses, inhabiting the area from the southernmost plains to the mountainous zone of eastern Sardinia (later part of what would be called by the Romans Barbaria); the Balares, living in the North-West corner; and finally the Corsi stationed in today's Gallura and the island to which they gave the name, Corsica. Nuragic Sardinians have been connected by some scholars to the Sherden, a tribe of the so-called Sea Peoples, whose presence is registered several times in ancient Egyptian records.

The language or languages spoken in Sardinia during the Bronze Age is unknown since there are no written records of such period. According to Eduardo Blasco Ferrer, the Paleo-Sardinian language was akin to Proto-Basque and the ancient Iberian. In contrast, others believe it was related to Etruscan. Other scholars theorize that there were various linguistic areas (two or more) in Nuraghic Sardinia, possibly Pre-Indo-European and Indo-European.

=== Antiquity ===
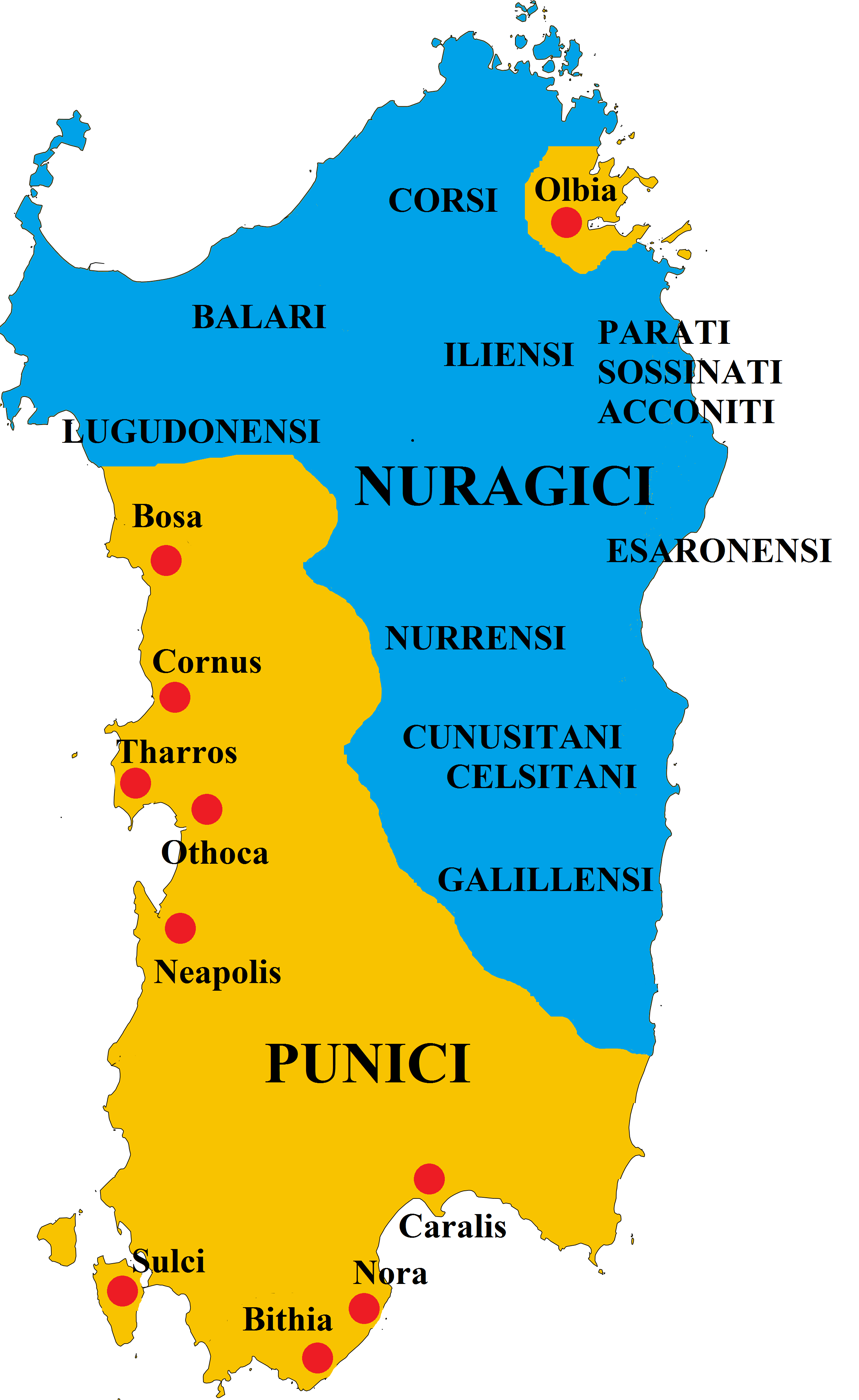
In yellow are the territories occupied by Carthage, with the red dots being their most notable settlements.

In the 8th century BCE, Phoenicia founded colonies and ports along the southern and western coast, such as Karalis, Bithia, Sulki and Tharros; starting from the same areas, where the relations between the indigenous Sardinians and the descendants of Phoenician settlers, the Punic people, had been so far peaceful, the Carthaginians proceeded to annex the southern and western part of Sardinia in the late 6th century BC. Well into the 1st century BCE, native Sardinians were said to have preserved many cultural affinities with the Punic people of North Africa.

After the First Punic War, the whole island was conquered by the Romans in the 3rd century BC. Sardinia and Corsica were then made into a single province; however, it took the Romans more than another 150 years to manage to subdue the more belligerent Nuragic tribes of the interior, and after 184 years since the Sardinians fell under Roman sway, Cicero noted how there was still not on the island a single community which had had friendly intercourse with the Roman people. Even from the former Sardo-Carthaginian settlements, with which the Sardinian mountaineers had formed an alliance in a common struggle against the Romans, indigenous attempts emerged aimed at resisting cultural and political assimilation: inscriptions in Bithia dating to the period of Marcus Aurelius were found, and they still followed the old Punic script at a time when even in North Africa the script was neo-Punic; Punic-style magistrates called sufetes wielded local control in Nora and Tharros through the end of the first century B.C., although two sufetes existed in Bithia as late as the mid-second century CE. Overall, Sardinia was quite disliked by the Romans and, as isolated as it was kept, Romanization proceeded at a relatively slow pace.

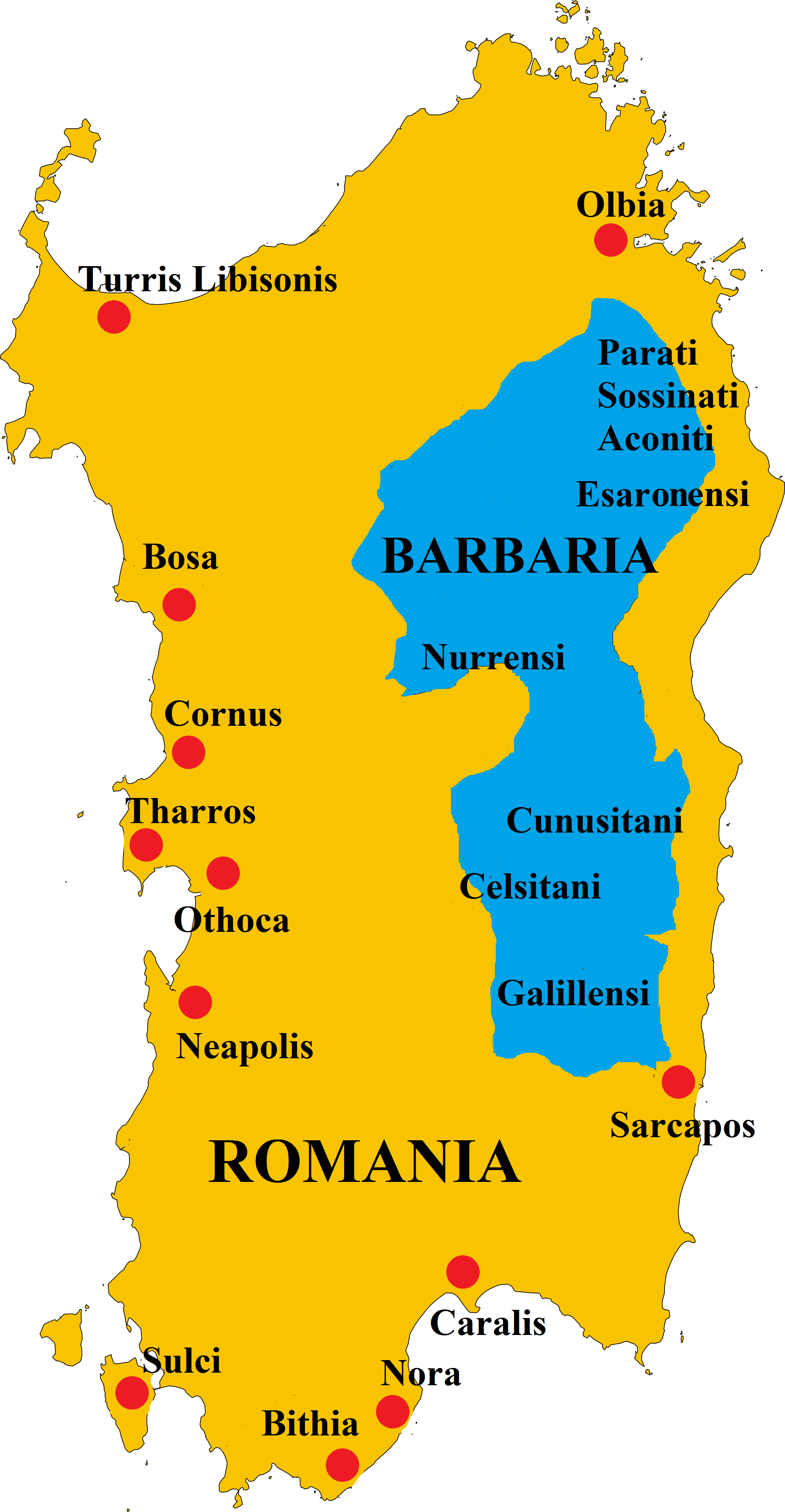
The Barbaria (in blue) and the Roman-controlled regions of Sardinia (in yellow) with the red dots being their most prominent settlements.

During the Roman rule, there was a considerable immigration flow from the Italian peninsula into the island; ancient sources mention several populations of Italic origin settling down in Sardinia, like the Patulcenses Campani (from Campania), the Falisci (from southern Etruria), the Buduntini (from Apulia) and the Siculenses (from Sicily); Roman colonies were also established in Porto Torres (Turris Libisonis) and Uselis. The Italic immigrants were confronted with a difficult coexistence with the natives, who were reluctant to assimilate to the language and customs of the colonists; many aspects of the ancient Sardo-Punic culture are documented to have persisted well into Imperial times, and the mostly mountainous innerlands came to earn the name of Barbaria ("Land of the Barbarians", similar in origin to the word Barbary) as a testament of the fiercely independent spirit of the tribes who dwelled therein (in fact, they would continue to practice their indigenous prehistoric religion up until the age of Pope Gregory I).

Therefore, at the beginning of the imperial age, the Sardinian population appears remarkably composite: the coexistence between the natives and the Italic immigrants was not easy; the integration turned out to be slow, different from region to region and, in the inland areas, firmly closed to confrontation with the Romans, only superficial and not irreversible..

— Attilio Mastino, Storia della Sardegna antica p.173

Nevertheless, Sardinia would eventually undergo cultural Romanization, the modern Sardinian language being one of the most evident cultural developments thereof. Strabo gave a brief summary about the Mountaineer tribes, living in what would be called civitates Barbariae, Geographica V ch.2:

There are four nations of mountaineers, the Parati, Sossinati, Balari, and the Aconites. These people dwell in caverns. Although they have some arable land, they neglect its cultivation, preferring rather to plunder what they find cultivated by others, whether on the island or on the continent, where they make descents, especially upon the Pisatæ. The prefects sent [into Sardinia] sometimes resist them, but at other times leave them alone, since it would cost too dear to maintain an army always on foot in an unhealthy place.

Like any other subjects of the Empire, Sardinians too would be granted Roman citizenship in 212 AD with the Constitutio Antoniniana by Caracalla.

=== Middle Ages ===
After the fall of the Western Roman Empire, Sardinia was ruled in rapid succession by the Vandals, the Byzantines, the Ostrogoths and again by the Byzantines, when the island was, once again in its history, joined to North Africa as part of the Exarchate of Africa.

During the Middle Ages, the "Sardinian Nation" (Nació Sarda or Sardesca, as reported from the native and Aragonese dispatches) was juridically divided into four kingdoms, known collectively in Sardinian as Judicadu, Giudicau or simply Logu "Place"; in Italian: Giudicato); all of them, except for the Judicate of Arborea, fell under the influence of the maritime republics of Genoa and Pisa, as well as some noble families from the two cities, like the Doria family, the Della Gherardesca family, and the Malaspina family. The Dorias founded the cities of Alghero and Castelgenovese (today Castelsardo), while the Pisans founded Castel di Castro (today Cagliari) and Terranova (today Olbia); the famous count Ugolino della Gherardesca, quoted by Dante Alighieri in his Divine Comedy, favored the birth of the mining town of Villa di Chiesa (today Iglesias), which became an Italian medieval commune along with Sassari and Castel di Castro. These new cities attracted migrants from the Italian peninsula, Corsica and several regions of Sardinia.

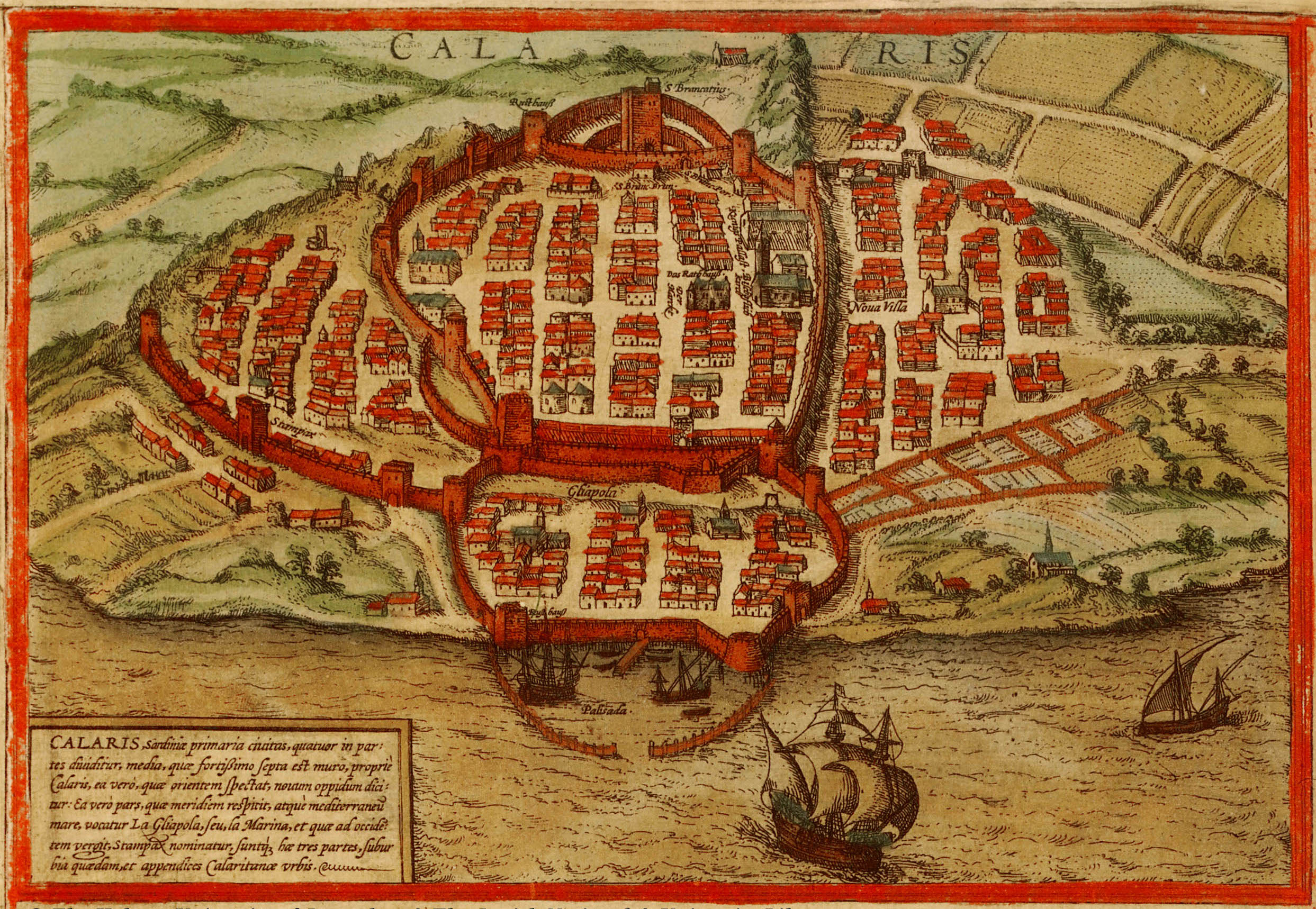
View of Cagliari (Calaris) from the "Civitates orbis terrarum" (1572)

Following the Aragonese conquest of the Sardinian territories under Pisan rule, which took place between 1323 and 1326, and then the long conflict between the Aragonese Kingdom and the Judicate of Arborea (1353–1420), the newborn Kingdom of Sardinia became one of the Associate States of the Crown of Aragon. The Aragonese repopulated the cities of Castel di Castro and Alghero predominantly with Catalans and the Algherese dialect of Catalan is still spoken by a minority in the city of Alghero.

=== Modern and contemporary history ===
In the 16th and 17th centuries, the main Sardinian cities of Cagliari (the capital of the Kingdom), Alghero and Sassari appear well placed in the trade routes of the time. The cosmopolitan composition of its people provides evidence of it: the population was not only indigenous, but also hailing from Spain, Liguria, France and the island of Corsica in particular. Especially in Sassari and across the strip of territory that goes from Anglona to Gallura, the Corsicans became the majority of the population at least since the 15th century. This migration from the neighboring island, which is likely to have led to the birth of the Tuscan-sounding Sassarese and Gallurese dialects, went on continuously until the 19th century.

The Spanish era ended in 1713, when Sardinia was ceded to the Austrian House of Habsburg, followed with another cession in 1718 to the Dukes of Savoy, who assumed the title of "Kings of Sardinia" and ruled the island from Turin, in Piedmont. During this period, Italianization policies were implemented, so as to assimilate the islanders to the then Savoyard mainland (stati di terraferma). In 1738, the Ligurian colonists escaped from Tabarka (Tunisia) were invited by Charles Emmanuel III to settle on the little islands of San Pietro and Sant'Antioco (at Carloforte and Calasetta), in the south-west area of Sardinia, bringing with them a Ligurian dialect called "Tabarchino", still widely spoken there. Then, the Piedmontese Kingdom of Sardinia annexed the whole Italian peninsula and Sicily in 1861 after the Risorgimento, becoming the Kingdom of Italy.

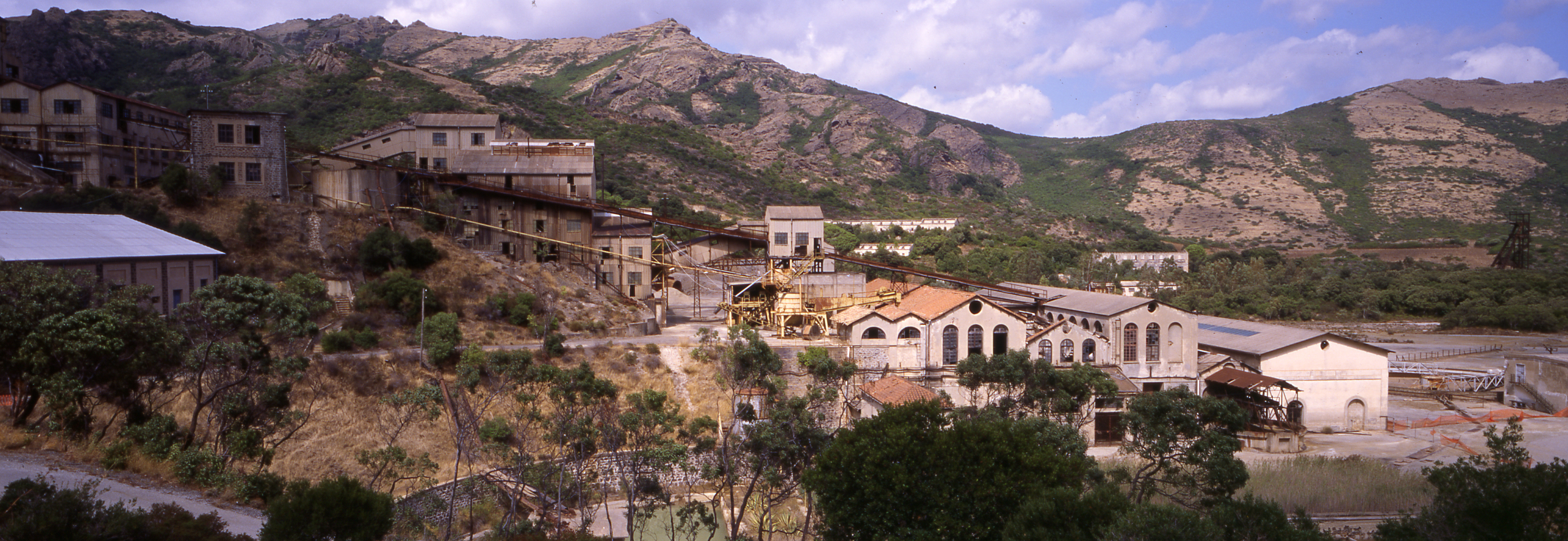
Montevecchio mine

Since 1850, with the reorganization of the Sardinian mines, there had been a considerable migration flow from the Italian peninsula towards the Sardinian mining areas of Sulcis-Iglesiente; these Mainland miners came mostly from Lombardy, Piedmont, Tuscany and Romagna. According to an 1882 census realised by the French engineer Leon Goüine, 10,000 miners worked in the south-western Sardinian mines, one third of whom being from the Italian mainland; most of them settled in Iglesias and frazioni .

At the end of the 19th century, communities of fishermen from Sicily, Torre del Greco (Campania) and Ponza (Lazio) migrated on the east coasts of the island, in the towns of Arbatax/Tortolì, Siniscola and La Maddalena.

In 1931, only 3.2% of the island's population was estimated to be native of the Mainland. A central government policy would change this situation in the following years, which saw an immigration flow from the Italian peninsula: the Fascist regime resettled to Sardinia a considerable number of miners and peasants from a wide variety of regions like Veneto, Marche, Abruzzo and Sicily, who were encouraged to populate the new mining town of Carbonia, or agrarian villages like Mussolinia di Sardegna ("Sardinia's Mussolinia", now Arborea) and Fertilia; after World War II, Italian refugees from the Istrian–Dalmatian exodus were relocated in the Nurra region, along the north-western coastline. As a result of the city's originally diverse composition, Carbonia developed a variety of Italian with some Sardinian influences from the neighbouring areas, while the other mainland coloni ("colonists") establishing minor centres kept their dialects of Istriot, Venetian and Friulan, which are still spoken by the elderly. In the same period, a few Italian Tunisian families settled in the sparsely populated area of Castiadas, east of Cagliari.

Following the Italian economic miracle, a historic migratory movement from the inland to the coastal and urban areas of Cagliari, Sassari-Alghero-Porto Torres and Olbia, where today most Sardinians live, took place.

== Demographics ==
With a population density of 69/km^{2}, slightly more than a third of the national average, Sardinia is the fourth least populated region in Italy. The population distribution was anomalous compared to that of other Italian regions lying on the sea. In fact, contrary to the general trend, from the late Middle Ages until the 20th century urban settlement has not taken place primarily along the coast but towards the centre of the island. Historical reasons for this include the repeated Moorish raids which made the coast unsafe, the abandonment of hundreds of settlements following the Sardinian–Aragonese war and the swampy nature of the coastal plains that were reclaimed only in the 20th century. Similarly to the Celtic clans, the Sardinians have in fact tended to retreat into the less accessible interior to keep their own independence and way of life. The situation has been recently reversed with the expansion of the industrialization and seaside tourism; today all Sardinia's major urban centres are located near the coast, while the island's interior is very sparsely populated.

It is the region of Italy with the lowest total fertility rate (1.087 births per woman), and the region with the second-lowest birth rate. However, the population in Sardinia has increased in recent years because of immigration, mainly proceeding from continental Italy and Sicily, but also from Eastern Europe (esp. Romania), Africa and Asia.

As of 2013, there were 42,159 foreign (that is, any people who have not applied for Italian citizenship) national residents, forming 2.5% of the total population.

=== Life expectancy and longevity ===
Diagram of longevity clues in the main Blue Zones

Average life expectancy is slightly over 82 years (85 for women and 79.7 for men).

Sardinia is the first discovered Blue Zone, a demographic and/or geographic area of the world where people live measurably longer lives. Sardinians share with the Ryukyuans from Okinawa (Japan) the highest rate of centenarians in the world (22 centenarians/100,000 inhabitants). The key factors of such a high concentration of centenarians are identified in the genetics of the Sardinians, lifestyle such as diet and nutrition, and the social structure.

=== Demographic indicators ===
- Birth rate: 8.3 (per 1,000 inhabitants – 2005)
- Total fertility rate: 1.07 (births per woman – 2005)
- Mortality rate: 8.7 (per 1,000 inhabitants – 2005)
- Infant mortality, males: 4.6 (per 1,000 births- 2000)
- Infant mortality, females: 3.0 (per 1,000 births – 2000)
- Marriage rate: 2.9 (per 1,000 inhabitants – 2014)
- Suicide rate, males: 20.4 (per 100,000 inhabitants)
- Suicide rate, females: 4.5 (per 100,000 inhabitants)
- Total literacy: 98.2%
- Literacy rate under 65 years old: 99.5%

=== Historical population ===
Historical population
Year	Pop.	±%
1485	157,578	—
1603	266,676	+69.2%
1678	299,356	+12.3%
1688	229,532	−23.3%
1698	259,157	+12.9%
1728	311,902	+20.4%
1751	360,805	+15.7%
1771	360,785	−0.0%
1776	422,647	+17.1%
1781	431,897	+2.2%
1821	461,931	+7.0%
1824	469,831	+1.7%
1838	525,485	+11.8%
1844	544,253	+3.6%
1848	554,717	+1.9%
1857	573,243	+3.3%
1861	609,000	+6.2%
1871	636,000	+4.4%
1881	680,000	+6.9%
1901	796,000	+17.1%
1911	868,000	+9.0%
1921	885,000	+2.0%
1931	984,000	+11.2%
1936	1,034,000	+5.1%
1951	1,276,000	+23.4%
1961	1,419,000	+11.2%
1971	1,474,000	+3.9%
1981	1,594,000	+8.1%
1991	1,648,000	+3.4%
2001	1,632,000	−1.0%
2011	1,639,362	+0.5%
Source: ISTAT 2011, – D.Angioni-S.Loi-G.Puggioni, La popolazione dei comuni sardi dal 1688 al 1991, CUEC, Cagliari, 1997 – F. Corridore, Storia documentata della popolazione di Sardegna, Carlo Clausen, Torino, 1902

=== Geographical distribution ===
Most Sardinians are native to the island but a sizable number have settled outside Sardinia: it is estimated that between 1955 and 1971, 308,000 Sardinians emigrated to the Italian mainland. Sizable Sardinian communities are located in Piedmont, Liguria, Lombardy, Tuscany and Latium.

Sardinians and their descendants are also numerous in Germany, France, Belgium, Switzerland and the United States (part of the broader Italian-American community). Almost all the Sardinians migrating to the Americas settled the Southern part of the continent, especially Argentina (between 1900 and 1913 about 12,000 Sardinians lived in Buenos Aires) and Uruguay (in Montevideo in the 1870s lived 12,500 Sardinians). Between 1876 and 1903, 92% of the Sardinians that moved towards the Americas settled in Brazil. Between 1876 and 1925 34,190 Sardinians migrated to Africa, in particular towards the then French Algeria and Tunisia. Small communities with Sardinians ancestors, about 5000 people, are also found in Brazil (mostly in the cities of Belo Horizonte, Rio de Janeiro and São Paulo), the UK, and Australia.

The Region of Sardinia keeps a register of overseas Sardinians who have managed to set up, in the Italian mainland and the rest of the world, a number of cultural associations: these are meant to provide the people of Sardinian descent, or those with an interest on Sardinian culture, an opportunity to enjoy a wide range of activities. As of 2012, there are 145 clubs registered on it.

Sardinians residing in European countries 2008
Germany	27,184
France	23,110
Belgium	12,126
Switzerland	7,274
Netherlands	6,040
Others	17,763
Total	93,497

Unlike the rest of Italian emigration, where migrants were mainly males, between 1953 and 1974 an equal number of females and males emigrated from Sardinia to the Italian mainland.

=== Surnames and given names ===
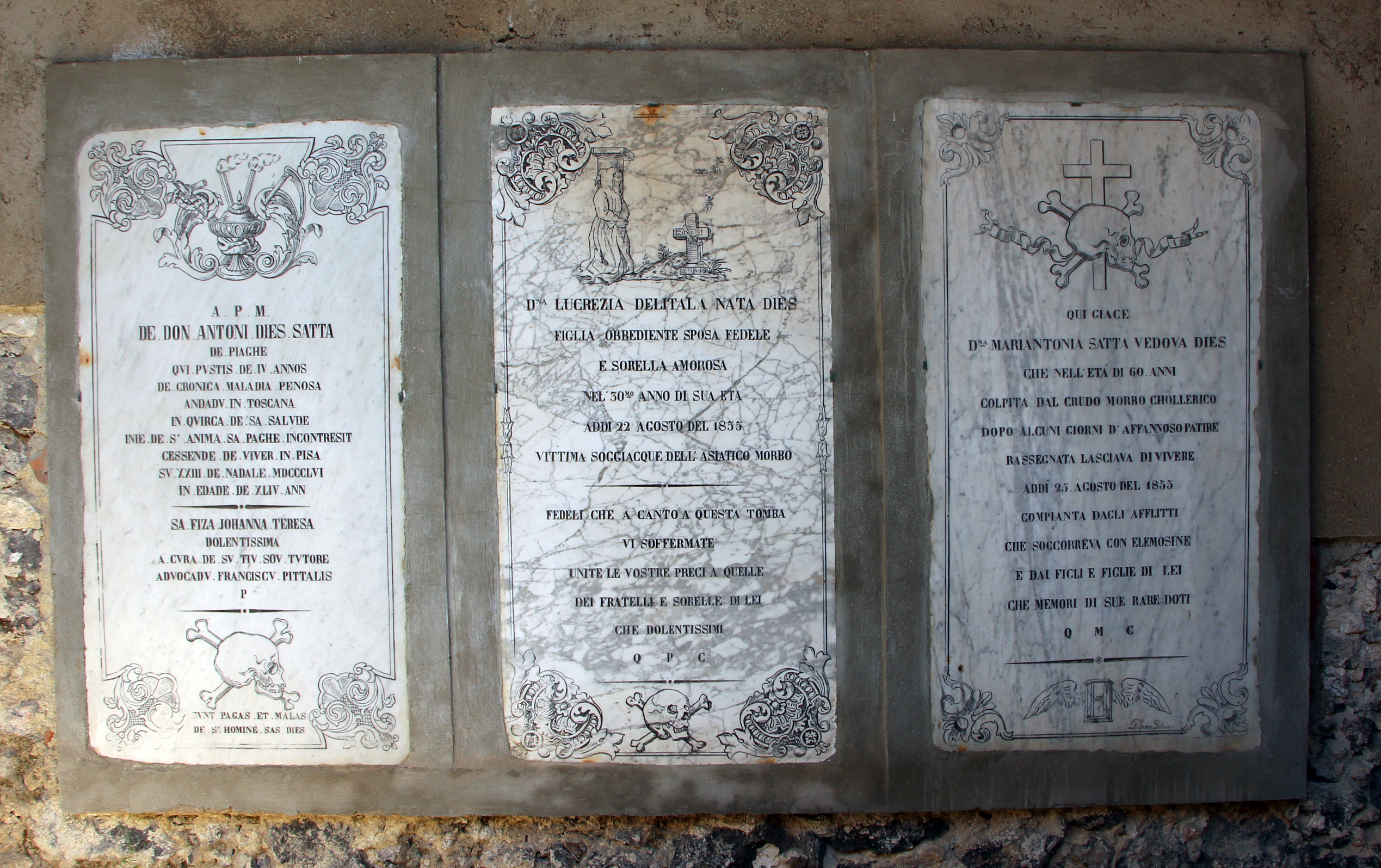
Historic cemetery of Ploaghe. In the tombstone to the left, dating back to the second half of the 19th century and written in Sardinian, some historical Sardinian given names are used (Antoni, Johanna Teresa, Franciscu). Such given names are however absent in the neighbouring tombstones written in Italian, which testifies to the ongoing process of language shift.

Fewer than a hundred Sardinian surnames are needed to group together as much as a third of the whole Sardinian population. The most common Sardinian surnames, like Sanna (fang), Piras (pears), Pinna (feather, pen) and Melis (honey), derive from the Sardinian language and developed among the Judicates in the Middle Ages as a result of being registered in documents like the condaghes for administrative purposes; most of them derive either from Sardinian place names (e.g. Fonnesu "from Fonni", Busincu "from Bosa" etc.), from animal names (e.g. Porcu "pig", Piga "magpie", Cadeddu "puppy" etc.) or from a person's occupation, nickname (e.g. Pittau "Sebastian"), distinctive trait (e.g. Mannu "big"), and filiation (last names ending in -eddu which could stand for "son of", e.g. Corbeddu "son/daughter of Corbu"); a number of them have undergone Italianization over the most recent centuries (e.g. Pintori, Scano, Zanfarino, Spano, etc.). Some local surnames also derive from terms of the Paleo-Sardinian substrate. The largest percentage of last names originating from outside the island is from Southern Corsica (like Cossu, Cossiga, Alivesi and Achenza, originally from the towns of Olivese and Quenza respectively), followed by Italian (especially Piedmontese but also Campanian, Sicilian and Ligurian, originating from the days of the Savoyard rule and the assimilation policy: some of them have been "Sardinianized", like Accardu, Calzinu, Gambinu, Raggiu, etc.) and Spanish (especially Catalan) surnames.

Most common surnames
1	Sanna
2	Piras
3	Pinna
4	Serra
5	Melis
6	Carta
7	Manca
8	Meloni
9	Mura
10	Lai
11	Murgia
12	Porcu
13	Cossu
14	Usai
15	Loi
16	Marras
17	Floris
18	Deiana
19	Cocco
20	Fadda

The Sardinian personal names (like Baínzu or Gavine "Gavin", Bachis "Bachisius", Bobore "Salvator", Iroxi "George", Chìrigu "Cyricus", Gonare "Gonarius", Elianora "Eleanor", Boele "Raphael", Sidore "Isidore", Billía "William", Tiadora "Theodora", Itria, etc.) are historically attested and were common among the islanders up until the contemporary era, when they switched in full measure to the Italian names.

=== Self-identification ===
Population surveys have been carried out, on repeated occasions, to provide information about the Sardinians' identity, as well as their conciliation with the institutional layers of political governance. The most detailed survey, conducted by the University of Cagliari and Edinburgh, made use of a Moreno Question which gave the following results: (1) just Sardinian, 26%; (2) more Sardinian than Italian, 37%; (3) equally Sardinian and Italian, 31%; (4) more Italian than Sardinian, 5%; (5) only Italian and not Sardinian, 1%. A 2017 poll by the Ixè Institute reported that 51% of the Sardinians questioned identified themselves as Sardinian (as opposed to an Italian average of 15% who identified by their region of origin) rather than Italian (19%), European (11%), and/or citizen of the world (19%).

== Culture ==
=== Languages ===
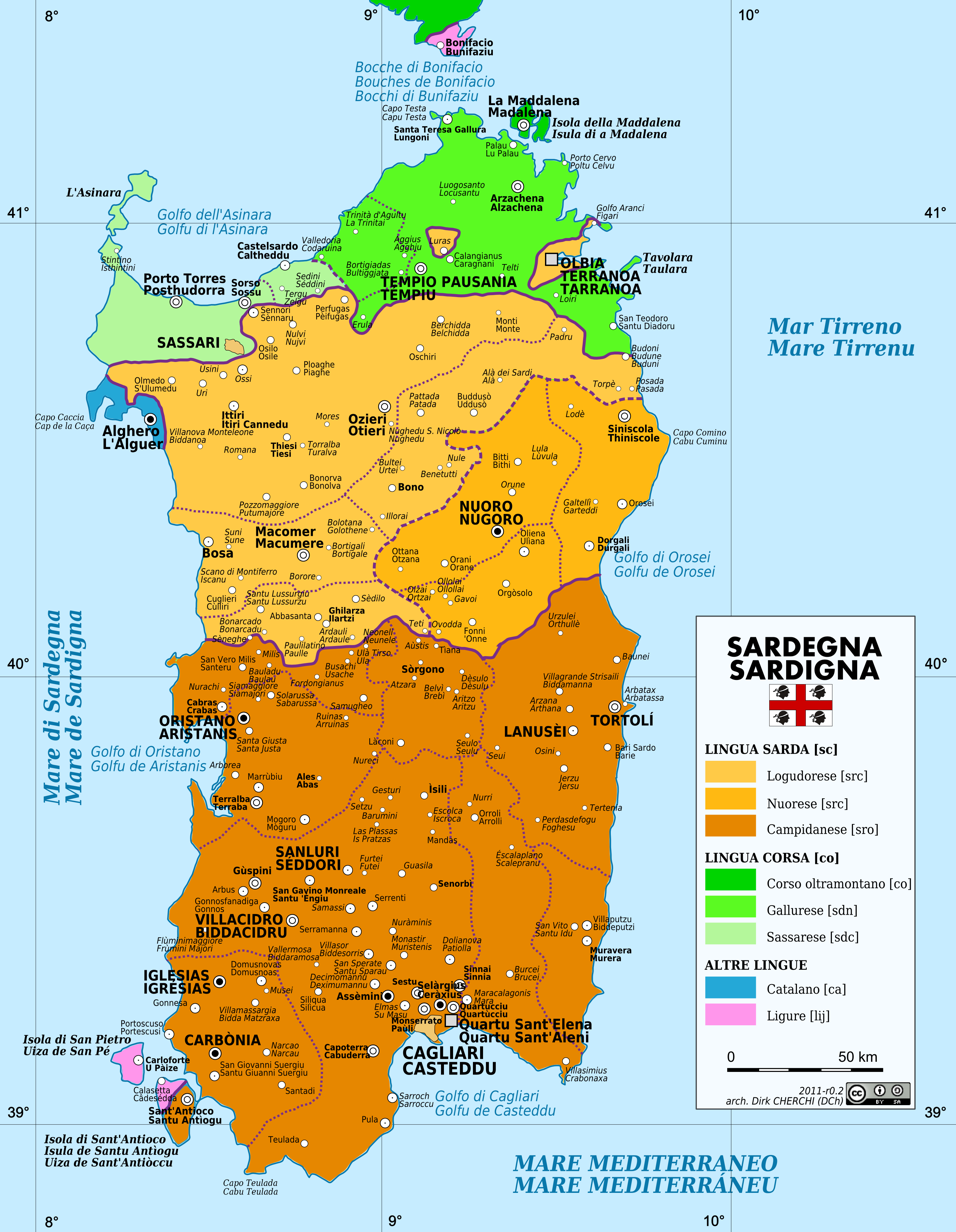
Geographic distribution of the traditional Sardinian languages and dialects

Italian (italiano) was first introduced to Sardinia by the House of Savoy in July 1760 and is the most commonly spoken language nowadays, albeit in a regional variety, as a result of policies fostering language shift and assimilation that imposed Italianization.

On the other hand, Sardinian (sardu) has been the native language of the indigenous Sards ever since Latin supplanted the Pre-Indo-European Paleo-Sardinian, a language supposedly related to Basque with some Berber influence and of which remnants can be still be found in vocabulary and local toponyms. The historical loss of the islanders' political autonomy has kept the language at a stage of dialectal fragmentation, reflecting the coexistence of the various other languages (namely Catalan, Spanish, and finally Italian) imposing themselves in a position of political and thereby social prestige. Because of a movement, described by some authors as a "linguistic and cultural revival" that gained traction in the postwar period, the Sardinians' cultural heritage was recognized in 1997 and 1999, which makes them the largest ethnolinguistic minority group in Italy, with around a million Sardinians still able to speak the language to some degree. However, because of a rigid model of Italian education system that has strongly promoted Italian to the detriment of Sardinian, the language has been in decline over the past century, since the people effectively retaining Sardinian have gradually become a minority in their own island (in fact, most Sardinians are linguistically Italianized nowadays, and it has been estimated that only 10-13 percent of the young native population have some active and passive competence in the language). Therefore, Sardinian is facing challenges analogous to other definitely endangered minority languages across Europe, and its two main Logudorese and Campidanese varieties, as defined by their standard orthographies, have been designated as such by UNESCO.

The other languages spoken in Sardinia, all also endangered but with much fewer speakers than Sardinian in absolute numbers, developed after the arrival of certain communities from outside the island, namely Corsicans, Catalans and Italians from Genoa and Pisa, settling in specific regions of Sardinia over the recent centuries; because of these dynamics, Sardinia's society has been characterized by situational plurilingualism since the late Middle Ages. These languages include Sassarese (sassaresu) and Gallurese (gadduresu), which are of remote Corso-Tuscan origin but often socially associated with Sardinian, Algherese Catalan (alguerés), and Ligurian Tabarchino (tabarchin).

The Sardinian people's flag, the Four Moors

=== Flag ===
The so-called flag of the Four Moors is the historical and official flag of Sardinia. The flag is composed of the St George's Cross and four Moor's heads wearing a white bandana in each quarter. Its origins are basically shrouded in mystery, but it is presumed it originated in Aragon to symbolize the defeat of the Moorish invaders in the battle of Alcoraz.

=== Sardinia's Day ===
Sa die de sa Sardigna ("Sardinia's Day" in English) is a holiday celebrated each 28 April to commemorate the revolt occurring from 1794 to 1796 against the feudal privileges, and the execution or expulsion of the Savoyard officials (including the then Piedmontese viceroy, Carlo Balbiano) from Sardinia on 28 April 1794. The revolt was spurred by the King's refusal to grant the island the autonomy the locals demanded in exchange for defeating the French. The holiday has been formally recognised by the Sardinian Council since 14 September 1993. Some public events are annually held to commemorate the episode, while the schools are closed.

=== Religion ===
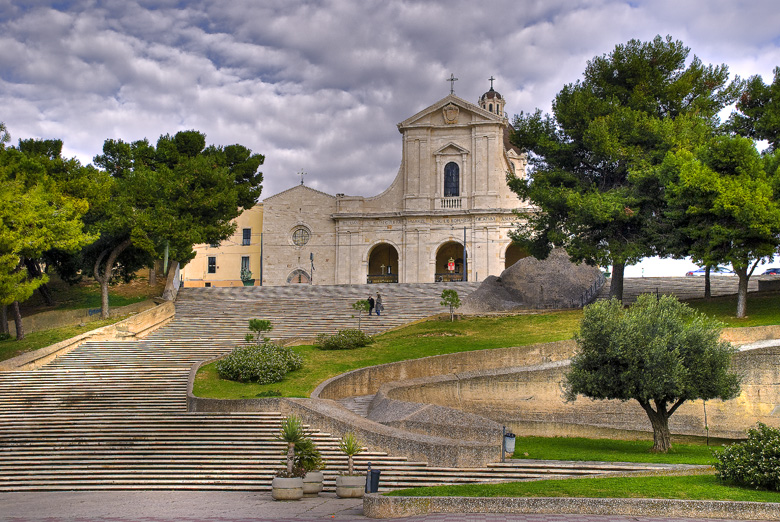
Basilica of Our Lady of Bonaria in Cagliari

The vast majority of the Sardinians are baptized as Roman Catholic, however church attendance is one of the lowest in Italy (21.9%). Our Lady of Bonaria is the Patroness Saint of Sardinia.

In popular traditions, beliefs and rites of pre-Christian origin, which have evolved symbiotically with Christianity, have survived until the contemporary era, for example the day of Su mortu mortu or "the dead dead" (2 November, All Souls' Day), the Sardinian equivalent to Halloween, when children go from house to house asking for small donations to feed the deceased (traditionally seasonal fruits, dried fruit, sweets, bread).

=== Traditional clothes ===
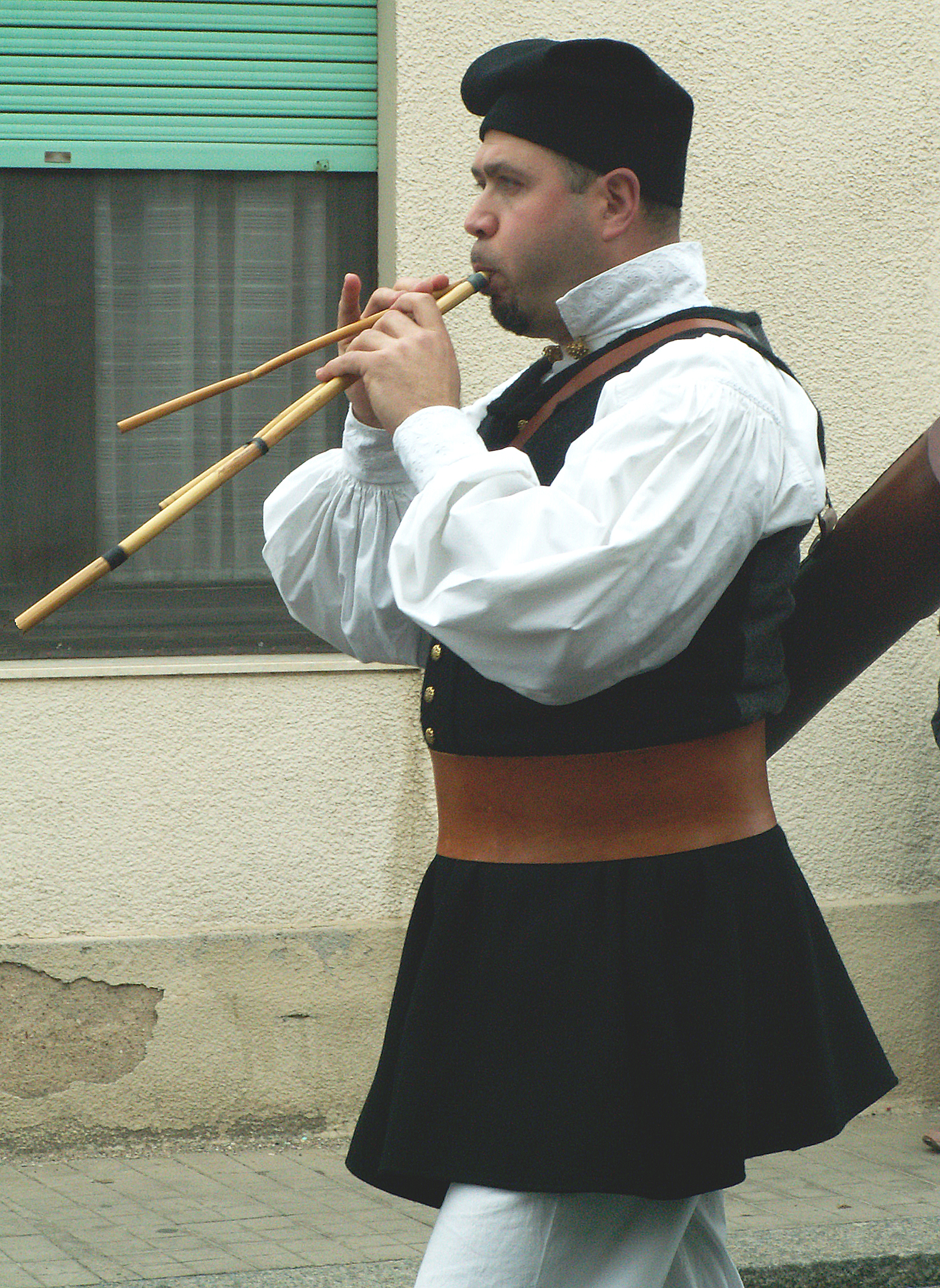
A Sardinian man in traditional dress playing the launeddas, an ancient woodwind instrument.

Colourful and of various and original forms, the Sardinian traditional clothes are an ancient symbol of belonging to specific collective identities, as well as one of the most genuine ethnic expressions of the Mediterranean folklore. Although the basic model is homogeneous and common throughout the island, each town or village has its own traditional clothing which differentiates it from the others. The Sardinians' traditional garments, as well as their jewellery, have been defined as an object of study in ethnography since the late 19th century, at a time in which they first started to be slowly displaced in favour of the "Continental fashion" in the various contexts of everyday life, and their primary function has since switched to become a marker of ethnic identity.

In the past, the clothes diversified themselves even within the communities, performing a specific function of communication as it made it immediately clear the marital status and the role of each member in the social area. Until the mid-20th century the traditional costume represented the everyday clothing in most of Sardinia, but even today in various parts of the island it is possible to meet elderly people dressed in costume. Herbert Kubly, writing for The Atlantic in 1955, said that «for Sardinians, traditional costumes are daily dress and not a holiday or touristic get-up. In the arid brown autumn landscape the population blossoms like flowers on the desert».

The materials used for their packaging are among the most varied, ranging from the typical Sardinian woollen fabric (orbace) to silk and from linen to leather. The various components of the feminine apparel are: the headgear (mucadore), the shirt (camisa), the bodice (palas, cossu), the jacket (coritu, gipone), the skirt (unnedda, sauciu), the apron (farda, antalena, defentale). Those of the male are: the headdress (berrita), the shirt (bentone or camisa), the jacket (gipone), the trousers (cartzones or bragas), the skirt (ragas or bragotis), the overcoat (gabbanu and colletu), and finally the piece of clothing most associated with the Sardinians, the mastruca, a sheep or goatskin leather jacket without sleeves: "Sardi pelliti" and "mastrucati latrones". "[Sardinian] thieves with rough wool cloaks" were names by which Cicero and other authors mentioned the Sardinians.

=== Cuisine ===
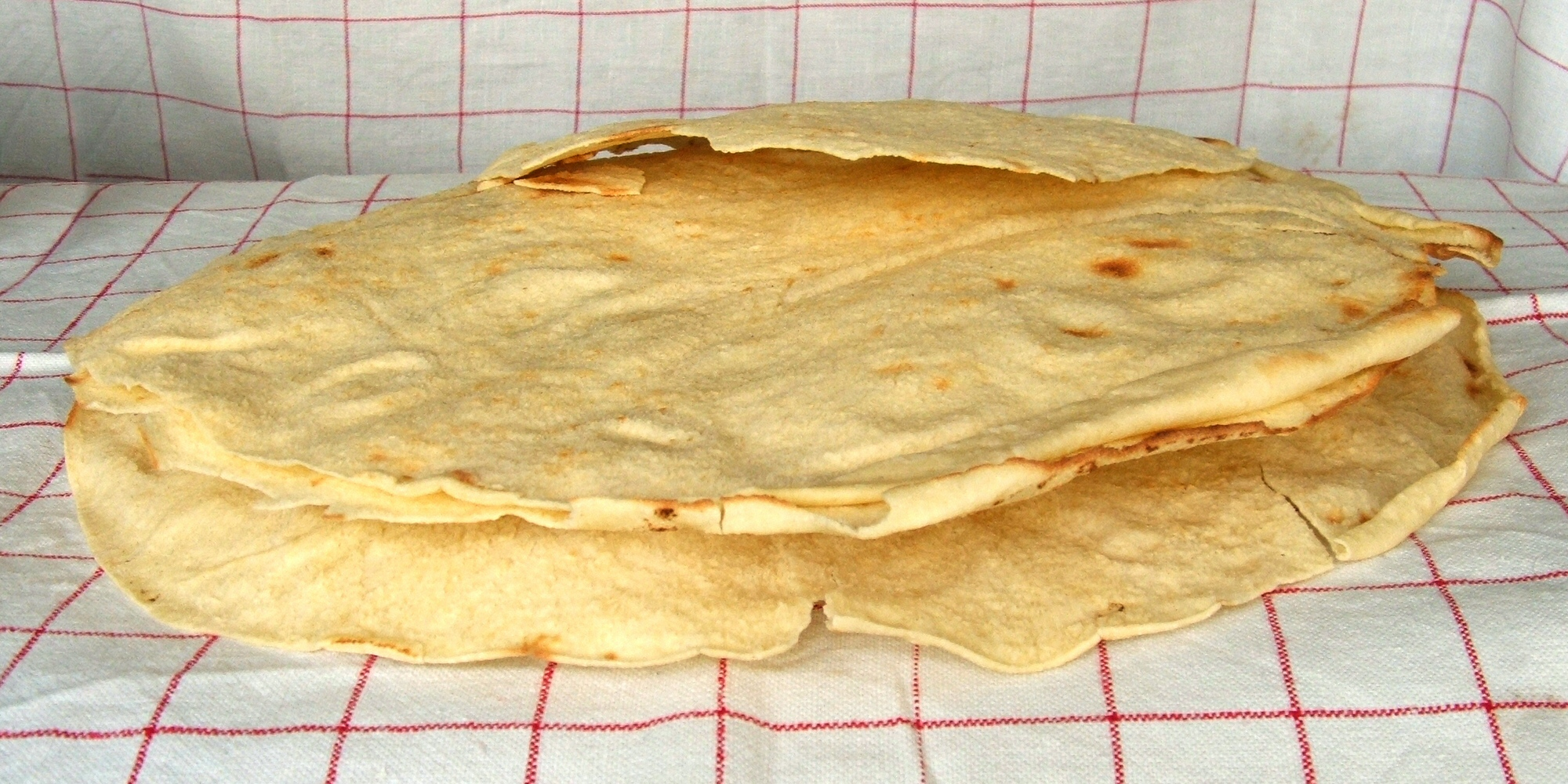
The pane carasau, a type of traditional flatbread eaten in Sardinia since the ancient times.

== Genetics ==
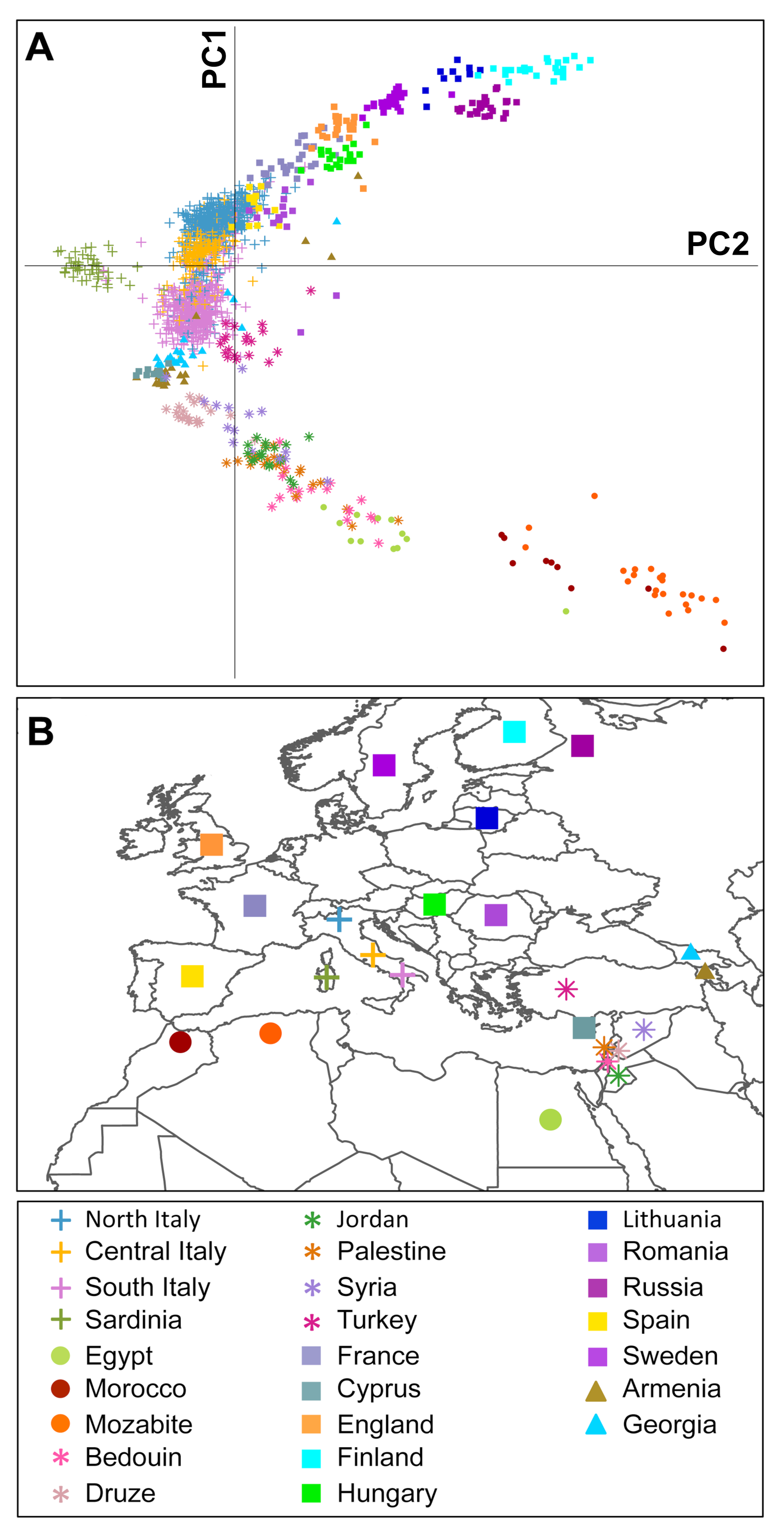
Plot of the principal components of the European and Mediterranean populations across Continental Europe, North Africa and the Middle East.

Sardinians, while being part of the European gene pool, are well-known outliers in the European genetic landscape (together with the Basques, the Chuvash, the Sami, the Finns and the Icelanders). Studies analyzing the DNA of both ancient and modern individuals from the island confirm that the current population is mainly (50% or more) derived from the prehistoric settlers (mostly Early Neolithic Farmers and to a lesser degree Western Hunter-Gatherers with few Bronze Age individuals showing evidences of Western Steppe Herder ancestry), plus some contribution of the historical colonizers, with the highest Neolithic and Mesolithic ancestry being found in the mountainous region of Ogliastra.

Several studies have been carried out on the genetics of the Sardinian population to investigate some pathologies to which the Sardinians seem to be predisposed in a unique way, likely linked due to founder effects and genetic drift of this island population, like diabetes mellitus type 1, beta thalassemia and favism, multiple sclerosis and coeliac disease. Some other genetic peculiarities have been noted, like the high frequency of rare uniparental haplotypes, extensive linkage disequilibrium of autosomal markers, high levels of homozygosity, the lowest frequency of RH-negative genes in the Mediterranean, the highest frequency in the world of the MNS*M gene, the highest frequency of HLAB*18 together with some typical North African alleles, and the highest frequency of the thalassemia variant β^{39}.

== See also ==
- List of Sardinians
- Sardinia
- History of Sardinia
- Nuragic civilization
- List of Nuragic tribes
- Sardinian language
- Sassarese
- Gallurese
- Sardinian surnames
- Corsicans
- Italians
- Catalans
