= Raul Jimenez Tellado =

Cosmologist and theoretical physicist (born 1967)

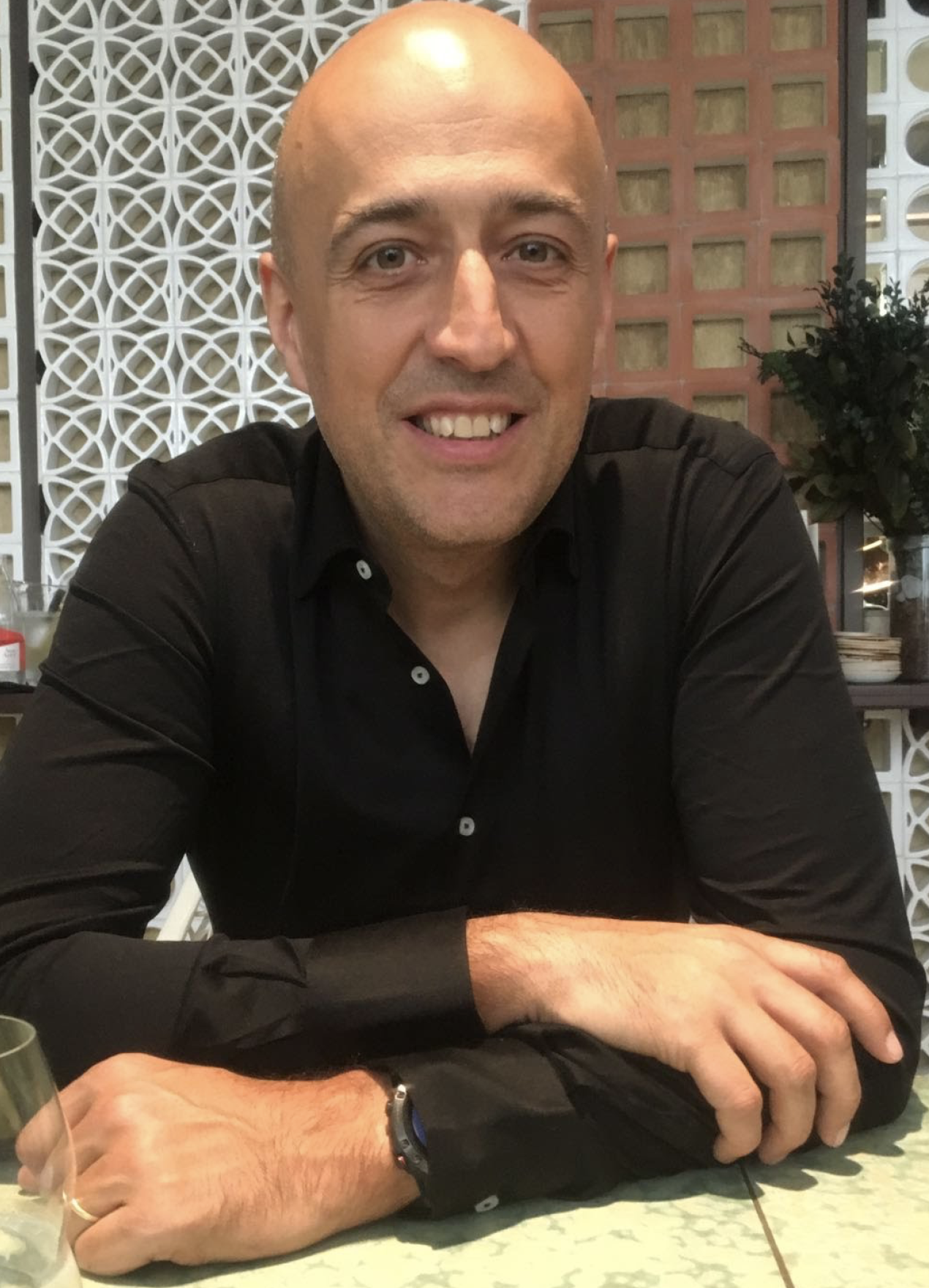
- Jimenez in 2018
- Born: 10 January 1967 (age 59); Madrid, Spain
- Citizenship: Spanish
- Education: Universidad Autonoma de Madrid; University of Copenhagen
- Known for: Stellar Ages; Expansion History of the Universe; Old galaxies Non-Gaussianity
- Scientific career
- Fields: Cosmology, Physics, Astrophysics, Statistics
- Workplaces: Universidad Autonoma de Madrid; University of Copenhagen; University of Edinburgh; Rutgers University; University of Pennsylvania; Institute for Advanced Study; Princeton University; University of Barcelona; Radcliffe Institute for Advanced Study; Imperial College
- Doctoral advisor: Uffe G. Jorgensen; Bernard Pagel
- Other academic advisors: John Peacock; Alan F. Heavens

Raúl Jiménez Tellado (born 10 January 1967), known professionally as Raul Jimenez, is a Spanish cosmologist and theoretical physicist and currently the ICREA Professor of Cosmology at the University of Barcelona. His research interests include the origin and evolution of the Universe, large-scale structure, dark matter, dark energy, inflation, the cosmic microwave background, statistics and Bayesian inference.

== Early life, education, and career ==
Jimenez was born in Madrid, Spain, in 1967 in the Salamanca District where he also grew up. He attended elementary and middle school at the Colegio Publico Ntra. Sea. de la Almudena. He completed his high school education at the Instituto de Bachillerato Cervantes in the natural sciences branch, and completed his undergraduate studies at the Universidad Autonoma de Madrid specializing in theoretical physics. He obtained his Ph.D. in 1995 at the Niels Bohr Institute of the University of Copenhagen.

He then moved to the Royal Observatory in Edinburgh, where he held a PPARC Advanced Fellowship. After this five-year period, he went to the U.S. where he joined the faculty of the Physics & Astronomy departments of Rutgers University and, later, the University of Pennsylvania. He joined ICREA in September 2007 as a Professor.

== Astronomical research ==
Jimenez is a cosmologist and works on theoretical cosmology and astrophysics. He uses astronomical observations to learn about the fundamental laws of nature. His research interests are broad and range from the origin and evolution of the universe to the physics of stars and stellar systems. He is also interested in large scale structures and the theory behind them. He has made several contributions to the analysis of large datasets and the introduction of Bayesian statistics in cosmology. His most cited papers are:

J Simon, L Verde, R Jimenez "Constraints of the redshift dependence of the dark energy profile", Physical Review D 71 (12), 123001 (905 Google Scholar citations)

D Stern, R Jimenez, L Verde, M Kamionkowski, SA Stanford "Cosmic chronometers: constraining the equation of state of dark energy. I: H (z) measurements" Journal of Cosmology and Astroparticle Physics 2010 (02), 008 (739 citations)

A Heavens, B Panter, R Jimenez, J Dunlop -"The star-formation history of the Universe from the stellar populations of nearby galaxies" Nature, 2004 (555 citations)

His research has been featured in several public outlets like New Scientist, Le Point, The Economist, and Forbes.

== Other work ==
His book Democracias Robotizadas, written with sociologist Luis Moreno Fernández has been translated to English and Italian. It gives a description of the current and future technologies employed in the development of machine learning and artificial intelligence, and elaborates on how our democracies can survive the progressive and inevitable robotization of our societies.

In his new book Behind Closed Doors, he reflects on the role that robotization, machine learning and big data had during the pandemic and how our society needs to adjust to the new reality of massive virtualization.

== Honors and awards ==
Among other honors, Raul Jimenez was a Henri Poincaré Institute/CNRS distinguished visiting professor in the Fall of 2018 and a Radcliffe Fellow at Harvard University from 2015 to 2016.
