= Campaign for Oxford =

Fundraising appeal for the University of Oxford

Coordinates: 51.7611°N 1.2534°W

The Campaign for Oxford
- Headquarters: University of Oxford, University Offices, Wellington Square, Oxford, OX1 2JD, UK
- Location(s): Offices in Oxford, China, Japan and North America
- Director of Development: Liesl Elder
- Parent organization: University of Oxford
- Website: campaign.ox.ac.uk
- Remarks: The current campaign is also known as Oxford Thinking

The University of Oxford has been running a series of fundraising appeals since 1988, under the name of the Campaign for Oxford. These appeals aim to raise funds for various academic and research purposes at the university, such as scholarships, buildings, libraries, and professorships. The Campaign for Oxford is the biggest higher education fundraising initiative in Europe. The Oxford University Development Office oversees the campaigns and sets new goals every few years.

== History ==
=== The decision to fundraise centrally ===
In the early 1980s, the university sector as a whole was facing a growing financial crisis as public funding was no longer adequate to meet its needs. Fundraising was one of several responses discussed by the Conference of University Administrators.

University fundraising was controversial. In the Oxford context, it entailed a significant expansion of the central university. Oxford University was traditionally a federation of colleges, and the central administration was originally viewed as a range of support functions for the colleges. Various pressures were enhancing the power of the central University, and it was a situation that made the heads of college uncomfortable. It was also not clear that alumni would feel an allegiance to Oxford University as opposed to their own colleges, and there was concern that a central appeal would detract from the much smaller appeals run by some of the poorer colleges.

Across the sector as a whole there was a considerable amount of distaste for fundraising. British universities had hitherto relied on government funding and research grants, but public funding was diminishing and universities found themselves increasingly unable to afford to refill vacant posts. Even so, there were differing opinions as to whether fundraising was an appropriate activity, as opposed to lobbying for public funding to be increased. There were questions over potential diversion of funds from 'real' charities, possible donor interference in academic impartiality, and the diversion of academic time from its prime purpose.

There was a significant financial risk for Oxford. The new Development Office represented a huge investment at a time of austerity, which was often expressed in terms of the opportunity cost of funding academic posts. The promised return on this investment was the largest goal of any British university campaign at that time.

Responsibility for convincing a reluctant and risk-averse university to undertake this new strategy lay largely with Sir Patrick Neill, subsequently Baron Neill of Bladen. As Vice-Chancellor Elect from 1983 to 1985, and Vice-Chancellor from 1985 to 1989. He persuaded the University to commission a report from the American consultancy firm, McKinsey, led by Nicholas Ulanov. This looked at the feasibility of fundraising and recommended methods by which it might be achieved. One of the consultants involved was the future Conservative Party leader, William Hague.

=== 1988–94 The first Campaign for Oxford ===
In 1988, Oxford took the step of launching its first major fundraising campaign of the modern era. Known simply as The Campaign for Oxford, it was set the then target of raising £220m in five years, to include research grants and contracts. This required an investment not only in a major office in Oxford, but also in permanent offices in New York and Tokyo. These were enhanced by the donation of a further office in Toronto.

Dr Henry Drucker, a former senior lecturer in politics at the University of Edinburgh and director of its development committee, was recruited to lead the new office. He drew on the McKinsey Report and work done at universities such as Princeton and Duke to devise a new model for university fundraising in the British context. He eschewed the 'cold' mail-shot techniques then dominant in British fundraising, emphasizing the importance of building relationships with prospects and involving them fully in the projects they funded.

The Campaign was successful, it became clear it would surpass its original target; thus in 1993 it was extended for a year and set the target of £340m, which it achieved in October 1994. It had funded new research centres, buildings and 117 academic posts including 34 professorships.

=== 2008 The second Campaign, Oxford Thinking ===
The second campaign was launched in 2008 under the title The Oxford Thinking Campaign. Its initial target was set at £1.25bn. It surpassed this in 2012 and the University set a new target of £3bn. In 2015 Oxford announced that it was raising funds at the rate of over £200m a year, the highest in UK higher education. Funds raised through the Campaign support three core priorities: student support; academic posts and programmes; and infrastructure.

== Impact ==
The visible impacts of the two campaigns were buildings being made, more scholarships offered and the building of more posts. A sample of these are listed below.

- The Saïd Business School, founded by Wafic Saïd, who has donated £70m. This has subsequently been enhanced by the Thatcher Business Education Centre, opened by The Prince of Wales in 2013 and named by Prime Minister David Cameron in 2014.
- The Moritz-Heyman Scholarship Programme, providing support to students at a socio-economic or educational disadvantage. This was created with a £75m gift from the venture capitalist Sir Michael Moritz and his wife, the writer Harriet Heyman. It was the biggest philanthropic gift for undergraduate financial support in European history.
- The Li Ka Shing Centre for Health Information and Discovery, where more than 600 scientists will use big data research and advances in genomics to transform our understanding of disease. This was funded by £20m from the charitable foundations of Hong Kong entrepreneur, Sir Ka-shing Li.
- The Mica and Ahmet Ertegun Graduate Scholarship Programme in the Humanities, endowed by a £26m gift from Mica Ertegun.
- The Blavatnik School of Government, founded with a £75m donation from Leonard Blavatnik.
- The redevelopment of the Ashmolean Museum

The central Campaign also meant the Vice-Chancellor could gain new funds independently of the colleges. This was part of a trend that in 2004 led to the appointment of the first Vice-Chancellor to be elected from outside Oxford's academic body in 900 years, Sir John Hood.

== Notable people associated with the Campaign for Oxford ==
- Sir Patrick Neill, subsequently Baron Neill of Bladen, founding Vice-Chancellor
- Henry Drucker, founding Director
- Vivien Duffield, Chair 2007–10
- Nicholas Goodrick-Clarke, fundraiser
- Gerard Vaughan, deputy director 1991–94
