= Logudorese Sardinian =

Written standard of the Sardinian language

- sardu logudoresu logudoresu
- Native to: Italy
- Region: Sardinia ( Central-southern part of the Province of Sassari; Northern part of the Province of Nuoro; Northern part of the Province of Oristano)
- Ethnicity: Sardinians
- Native speakers: (500,000 cited 1999)
- Language family: Indo-European: Italic; Latino-Faliscan; Latin; Romance; Southern Romance; Sardinian; Logudorese Sardinian

Language codes
- ISO 639-3: src
- Glottolog: logu1236
- ELP: Logudorese Sardinian
- Linguasphere: 51-AAA-sa
- Logudorese Sardinian is classified as Definitely Endangered by the UNESCO Atlas of the World's Languages in Danger.

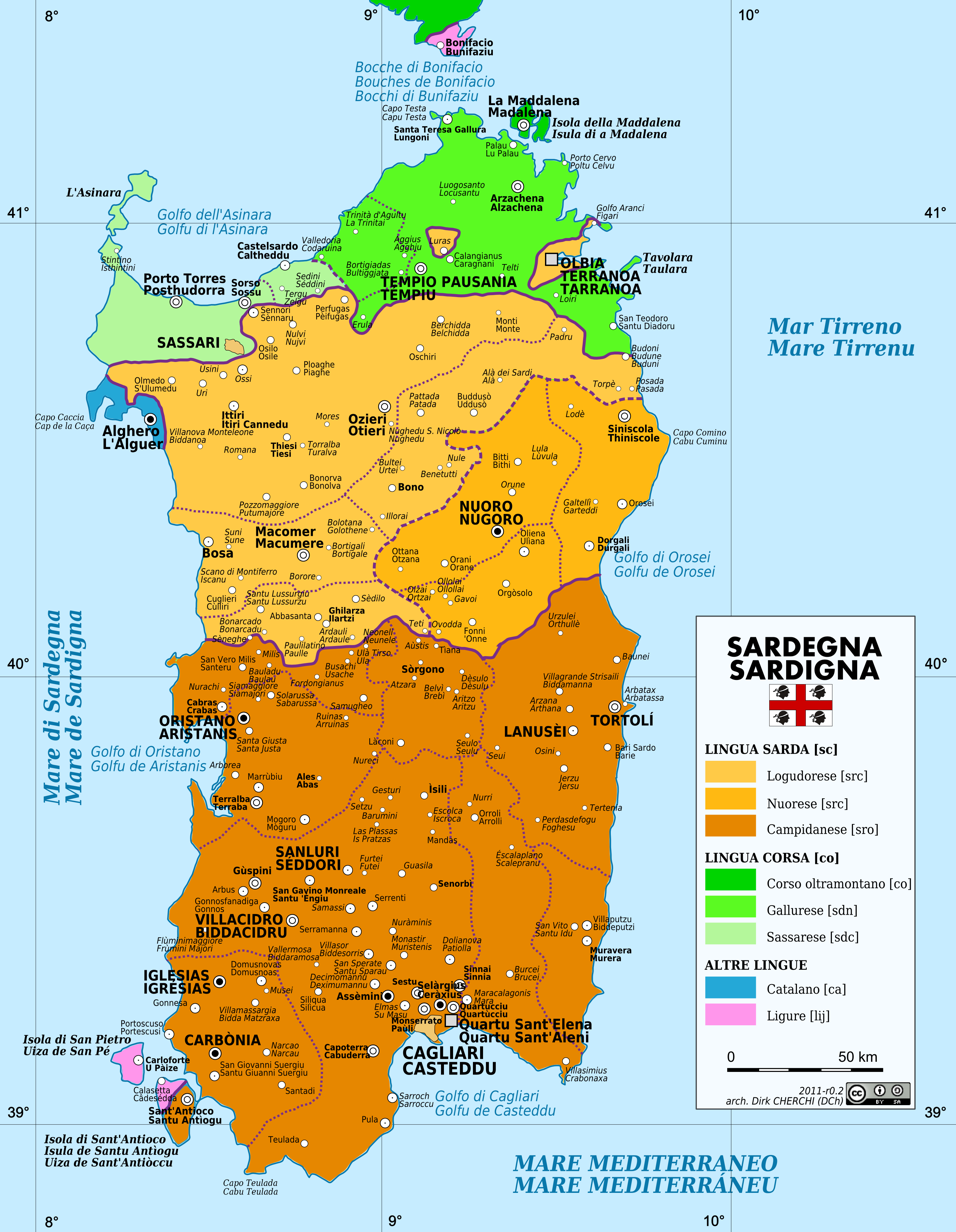
- Languages and dialects of Sardinia

Logudorese Sardinian (Sardinian: sardu logudoresu, Italian: sardo logudorese) is one of the two written standards of the Sardinian language, which is often considered one of the most, if not the most conservative of all Romance languages. The orthography is based on the spoken dialects of central northern Sardinia, identified by certain attributes which are not found, or found to a lesser degree, among the Sardinian dialects centered on the other written form, Campidanese. Its ISO 639-3 code is src.

== Classification ==
Latin /ɡ/ and /k/ before /i, e/ are not palatalized in Logudorese, in stark contrast with all other Romance languages. Compare Logudorese chentu with Italian cento /ˈtʃɛnto/, Spanish ciento /ˈθjento/, /ˈsjento/ and French cent /sɑ̃/. Like the other varieties of Sardinian, most subdialects of Logudorese also underwent lenition in the intervocalic plosives of -/p/-, -/t/-, and -/k/-/ (e.g. Lat. focum > fogu "fire", ripam > riba "shore, bank", rotam > roda "wheel"). Finally, Logudorese shifts the Latin labiovelars /kʷ/ and /ɡʷ/ into /b/ medially and /k/ word-initially (Lat. lingua > limba "tongue", qualem > cale "what").

Logudorese is intelligible to those from the southern part of Sardinia, where Campidanese Sardinian is spoken, but it is not to those from the extreme north of the island, where Corsican–Sardinian dialects are spoken.

Sardinian is an autonomous linguistic group rather than an Italian dialect as it is often noted because of its morphological, syntactic, and lexical differences from Italian. Therefore, Italian speakers do not understand Logudorese or any other dialect of the Sardinian language.

== Geographical distribution ==
The area of Logudoro (the term originated as a blend of the kingdom's name of Logu de Torres), in which it is spoken, is a northern subregion of the island of Sardinia with close ties to Ozieri (Othieri) and Nuoro (Nùgoro) for culture and language, as well as history, with important particularities in the western area, where the most important town is Ittiri. It is an area of roughly 150 × 100 km with some 500,000–700,000 inhabitants.

== Subdialects ==
Logudorese Sardinian has multiple subdialects, some confined to individual villages or valleys. Though such differences can be noticeable, the dialects are mutually intelligible, and share mutual intelligibility with the neighbouring Campidanese dialects as well.

=== Northern Logudorese ===
Spoken in the north of Sardinia, this subdialect contains the following features:

- /pl/, /fl/, /kl/ changes to /pi/, /fi/, /ki/ (Lat. plovere > piòere "rain", florem > fiore "flower", clavem > kiae "key");
- /ki/ < /kl/ is to be considered [c], but it is a rare pronunciation: it is commonly said [d͡ʒ] (clavem > chjae > giae "key");
- /r/ > /l/ in an intervocalic, pre-consonantal position (Northern Saldigna vs Southern Sardigna).

=== Central (Common) Logudorese ===
Spoken in Central Sardinia, this subdialect contains the following features:

- /pl/, /fl/, /kl/ changes to /pr/, /fr/, /kr/ (Lat. plovere > pròere "rain", florem > frore "flower", clavem > crae "key");
- /l/ > /r/ in an intervocalic, pre-consonantal position (Northern altu vs Southern artu "high").

=== Nuorese ===
The Nuorese dialect is spoken in three historical regions: Baronìa, Nuorese and Barbàgia of Ollolài. The three sub-varieties are quite different from one another, and each one of them includes some distinctive features not found anywhere else in Sardinia, many of which demonstrate the conservative nature of these dialects:

- No lenition of intervocalic plosives (e.g. Lat. focum > focu "fire", ripa > ripa "shore, bank", rota > rota "wheel" – Barbagian : ròda);
- No palatal realisation of /nj/ and /lj/, instead turning into /nn/ and /zz/, respectively (e.g. Lat. Sardinia > Sardinna and folium > foza "leaf");
- Preservation of intervocalic /ɡ/, /d/, and /v/ (Lat. augustus "August" > Log. austu but Nuo. agustu, Lat. credere "to believe" > Log. creere but Nuo. credere, Lat. novem "nine" > Log. noe vs Nuo. nobe/nove < nove);
- Deletion of the initial f, except when preceded by other consonants – and in the local dialects spoken in the towns of Nuoro and Ottàna (e.g. ocu "fire", àchere "to do");
- Baronìa: presence of the conjugations that end in -ta and -tu (e.g. tancatu "closed"; achirratu "went down"; baitatu "watched"; mutitu "called");
- Barbàgia di Ollolài: conjugations end in -à (instead of -ada) and -u (e.g. nau/narau "said"; mutiu "called"); presence of glottal stops in place of the hard c (k) found in the other Nuorese dialects (e.g. inohe "here"; ohu "fire"; àhere "to do"; hitho "early"; vohe "voice");
- Persistence of the Latin pronouns: Lat. ego > jeo, eo, ego, dego (the latter being once used in the city of Nuoro, and with the form ego most prominently used in the towns of Olièna, Gavòi and Ollolài, less frequent but still present in the village of Mamoiàda); Lat. ipse > issu, isse (particularly in the villages of Bitti and Onanì);
- Betacism of /v/ in Nuoro but not in Baronia and Barbàgia;
- Latin /t/ before yod to /θ/ in Nuorese (plateam "square, courtyard" > pratha), albeit in some places the sound is in the process of becoming /ts/ (pratza).

== Origins and features ==
The origins of Sardinian have been investigated by Eduardo Blasco Ferrer and others. The language derives from Latin and a pre-Latin, Paleo-Sardinian (Nuragic) substratum, but has been influenced by Catalan and Spanish due to the dominion of the Crown of Aragon and later the Spanish Empire over the island. Logudorese is the northern macro-dialect of the Sardinian language, the southern macro-dialect being Campidanese, spoken in the southern half of the island. The two dialects share a clear common origin and history, but have experienced somewhat different developments.

Though the language is typically Romance, some words are not of Latin origin, and are of uncertain etymology. One such is "nura", found in "nuraghe", the main form of pre-Roman building, hence the term for the pre-Roman era as the Nuragic Period. Various place names similarly have roots that defy analysis.

Logudorese Sardinian changed only very slowly from Vulgar Latin compared to other Romance lects, showing certain notably conservative phonological features relative to other Romance languages.

Linguist Mario Pei, in a 1949 paper, measured Logudorese Sardinian's accent vocalization as having diverged less from Classical Latin than had French, Spanish, Italian, Portuguese, Romanian, or Old Provençal. The paper emphasized, however, that it represented only "a very elementary, incomplete and tentative demonstration" of how statistical methods could measure linguistic change, assigned "frankly arbitrary" point values to various types of stressed-vowel change, and did not compare languages in the sample with respect to any characteristics other than stressed vowels, among other caveats.

Due to its conservatism, as well as the preservation of many works of traditional literature from the 15th century onwards, Logudorese is often considered to be the most prestigious variety of Sardinian.

== Sample texts ==
=== Matthew 6:9-13 ===
English	Logudorese Sardinian	Campidanese Sardinian	LSC (Sardinian Written Standard)	Latin	Italian
Our Father, who is in heaven, Hallowed be Your name. Your kingdom come. Your will be done, on earth as it is in heaven. Give us this day our daily bread, and forgive us our debts, as we also have forgiven our debtors. And do not lead us into temptation, but deliver us from evil.	Babbu nostru chi ses in chelu, Santificadu siat su nomine tou. Benzat a nois su rennu tou, Siat fata sa boluntade tua, comente in chelu gai in terra. Dona nos oe su pane nostru de donzi die, Et perdona nos sos peccados nostros, Comente nois perdonamus a sos depidores nostros. Et no nos lesses ruer in tentatzione, Et libera nos dae male.	Babbu nostu chi ses in celu, Santificau siat su nomini tuu. Bengiat a nosus su regnu tuu, Siat fata sa boluntadi tua, comenti in celu aici in terra. Donasi oi su pani nostu de dogna dii, Et perdonasi is peccaus nostus, Comenti nosus perdonaus a is depidoris nostus. Et no si lessis arrui in tentatzioni, Et liberasi de mali.	Babbu nostru chi ses in chelu, Santificadu siat su nòmine tuo. Bèngiat a nois su rennu tuo, Siat fata sa voluntade tua, comente in chelu gasi in terra. Dona་nos oe su pane nostru de ònnia die, E perdona་nos is pecados nostros, Comente nois perdonamus a is depidores nostros. E no nos lasses arrùere in tentatzione, E lìbera་nos de male.	Pater noster qui es in cælis, sanctificetur nomen tuum. Adveniat regnum tuum, fiat voluntas tua, sicut in cælo et in terra. Panem nostrum quotidianum da nobis hodie, et dimitte nobis debita nostra, sicut et nos dimittimus debitoribus nostris. et ne nos inducas in tentationem sed libera nos a malo.	Padre Nostro, che sei nei cieli, Sia santificato il tuo nome. Venga il tuo regno, Sia fatta la tua volontà, Come in cielo, così in terra. Dacci oggi il nostro pane quotidiano, E rimetti a noi i nostri debiti Come noi li rimettiamo ai nostri debitori. E non-ci indurre in tentazione, Ma liberaci dal male.

=== Jonah 1:4-9 ===
- Logudorese Sardinian

4 Su Segnore però mandesit unu grande bentu in su mare: et facta est una tempestade manna in mare, et sa nae perigulaiat de si fracassare. 5 Et timesint sos marineris, et clamesint sos homines ad su Deus ipsoro: et bettesint sas mercanzias, qui fint in sa nae, in mare, ad tales qui si allezerigheret da ipsas: et Jonas si que fit faladu ad s' internu de sa nae, et dormiat a somnu grae. 6 Et s' accostesit ad ipsu su patronu, et li nesit: Et proite tue ti laxas opprimere dai su somnu? pesa, et invoca su Deus tou, si pro sorte si ammentet Deus de nois, et non morzamus. 7 Et nesit s' unu ad s' ateru cumpagnu: Benide, et tiremus a sorte, et iscamus, proite custa istroscia siat ad nois. Et tiresint a sorte: et ruesit sa sorte subra Jonas. 8 Et nesint ad ipsu: Inzitanos, pro quale motivu siat ruta ad nois custa istroscia: qual' est s' arte tua? de quale populu ses tue? 9 Et nesit ad ipsos: Eo so Hebreu, et eo timo su Segnore Deus de su chelu, qui factesit su mare, et i sa terra.

- Latin

4 Dominus autem misit ventum magnum in mare, et facta est tempestas magna in mari, et navis periclitabatur conteri. 5 Et timuerunt nautae et clamaverunt unusquisque ad deum suum et miserunt vasa, quae erant in navi, in mare, ut alleviaretur ab eis. Ionas autem descenderat ad interiora navis et, cum recubuisset, dormiebat sopore gravi. 6 Et accessit ad eum gubernator et dixit ei: "Quid? Tu sopore deprimeris? Surge, invoca Deum tuum, si forte recogitet Deus de nobis, et non pereamus." 7 Et dixit unusquisque ad collegam suum: "Venite, et mittamus sortes, ut sciamus quare hoc malum sit nobis." Et miserunt sortes, et cecidit sors super Ionam. 8 Et dixerunt ad eum: "Indica nobis cuius causa malum istud sit nobis. Quod est opus tuum, et unde venis? Quae terra tua, et ex quo populo es tu?" 9 Et dixit ad eos: "Hebraeus ego sum et Dominum, Deum caeli, ego timeo, qui fecit mare et aridam."

- Italian

4 Il Signore scatenò un gran vento sul mare, e vi fu sul mare una tempesta così forte che la nave era sul punto di sfasciarsi. 5 I marinai ebbero paura e invocarono ciascuno il proprio dio e gettarono a mare il carico di bordo, per alleggerire la nave. Giona, invece, era sceso in fondo alla nave, si era coricato e dormiva profondamente. 6 Il capitano gli si avvicinò e gli disse: «Che fai qui? Dormi? Àlzati, invoca il tuo dio! Forse egli si darà pensiero di noi e non periremo». 7 Poi si dissero l’un l’altro: «Venite, tiriamo a sorte e sapremo per causa di chi ci capita questa disgrazia». Tirarono a sorte e la sorte cadde su Giona. 8 Allora gli dissero: «Spiegaci dunque per causa di chi ci capita questa disgrazia! Qual è il tuo mestiere? Da dove vieni? Qual è il tuo paese? A quale popolo appartieni?» 9 Egli rispose loro: «Sono Ebreo e temo il Signore, Dio del cielo, che ha fatto il mare e la terraferma».

- English

4 However, the LORD hurled a great wind on the sea and there was a great storm on the sea, so that the ship was about to break up. 5 Then the sailors became afraid and every man cried out to his god, and they hurled the cargo which was in the ship into the sea to lighten it for them. But Jonah had gone below into the stern of the ship, had lain down, and fallen sound asleep. 6 So the captain approached him and said, "How is it that you are sleeping? Get up, call on your god! Perhaps your god will be concerned about us so that we will not perish." 7 And each man said to his mate, "Come, let’s cast lots so that we may find out on whose account this catastrophe has struck us." So they cast lots, and the lot fell on Jonah. 8 Then they said to him, "Tell us, now! On whose account has this catastrophe struck us? What is your occupation, and where do you come from? What is your country, and from what people are you?" 9 So he said to them, "I am a Hebrew, and I fear the LORD God of heaven who made the sea and the dry land."

== Literature ==
A large body of Sardinian poetry, songs and literature is composed in Logudorese.

== See also ==
- Sardinian language
  - Campidanese Sardinian
