= Conservative and innovative language =

Linguistics term for language forms that change little over time

In linguistics, a conservative form, variety, or feature of a language or dialect is one that has changed relatively little across the language's history, or which is relatively resistant to change. It is the opposite of innovative, innovating, or advanced forms, varieties, or features, which have undergone relatively larger or more recent changes. Furthermore, an archaic form is not only chronologically old (and often conservative) but also rarely used anymore in the modern language, and an obsolete form has fallen out of use altogether. An archaic language stage is chronologically old, compared to a more recent language stage, while the terms conservative and innovative typically compare contemporary forms, varieties or features.

== Definition ==
A conservative linguistic form, such as a word or sound feature, is one that remains closer to an older form from which it evolved than cognate forms from the same source. For example, the Spanish word caro /'kaɾo/ and the French word cher /ʃɛʁ/, both adjectives meaning 'dear' or 'beloved', similarly evolved from the Latin word cārum ['ka:rum ~ -ɾũː] (Proto-Romance */ˈka.ru/). The Spanish word, which is more similar to the common ancestor, is more conservative than its French cognate, which is more innovative.

A language or language variety is said to be conservative if it has fewer new developments or changes than related varieties do. For example, Icelandic is, in some aspects, more similar to Old Norse than other languages that evolved from Old Norse, including Danish, Norwegian, or Swedish, while Sardinian (especially the Nuorese dialects) and Italian are regarded as being the most conservative Romance languages. A 2008 study regarding the stability of modern Icelandic appears to confirm its status as "stable". Therefore, Icelandic and Sardinian are considered relatively conservative languages. Likewise, some dialects of a language may be more conservative than others.

== Dialects and forms ==
Standard varieties, for example, tend to be more conservative than nonstandard varieties, since education and codification in writing tend to retard change.

Writing is generally said to be more conservative than speech since written forms generally change more slowly than spoken language does. That helps explain inconsistencies in writing systems such as that of English; since the spoken language has changed relatively more than has the written language, the match between spelling and pronunciation is inconsistent.

== Examples of conservative and innovative languages ==
A language may be conservative in one respect while simultaneously innovative in another. Bulgarian and Macedonian, closely related Slavic languages, are innovative in the grammar of their nouns, having dropped nearly all vestiges of the complex Slavic case system; at the same time, they are highly conservative in their verbal system, which has been greatly simplified in most other Slavic languages. English, which is one of the more innovative Germanic languages in most respects (vocabulary, inflection, vowel phonology, syntax), is nevertheless conservative in its consonant phonology, retaining sounds such as (most notably) /θ/ and /ð/ (th), which remain only in the Germanic languages of English, Icelandic and Scots, with /ð/ also remaining in the endangered Elfdalian language. Sardinian, the most conservative Romance language both lexically and phonetically, has a verbal morphology that is somewhat simpler than that of other Romance languages such as Spanish or Italian.

In the 6th century AD, Classical Arabic was a conservative Semitic language compared with Classical Syriac, which was spoken at the same time; Classical Arabic strongly resembles reconstructed Proto-Semitic, and Syriac has changed much more. Compared to closely related modern Northeastern Neo-Aramaic, which is not necessarily directly descended from it, Classical Syriac is still a highly archaic language form because it is also chronologically old. Georgian has changed remarkably little since the Old Georgian period (the 4th/5th century AD).

In the context of whole language families, Lithuanian and Finnish are the most conservative within modern Indo-European languages and Uralic languages respectively.

== See also ==
- Great Vowel Shift – Pronunciation change in English between 1350 and 1700
- Historical linguistics
- Philology – Study of language in historical sources
- Prestige (sociolinguistics) – Level of respect towards a language variety in a speech community
- Archaism – archaic words, senses, or styles
