= Luis Moreno Fernández =

Luis Moreno Fernandez
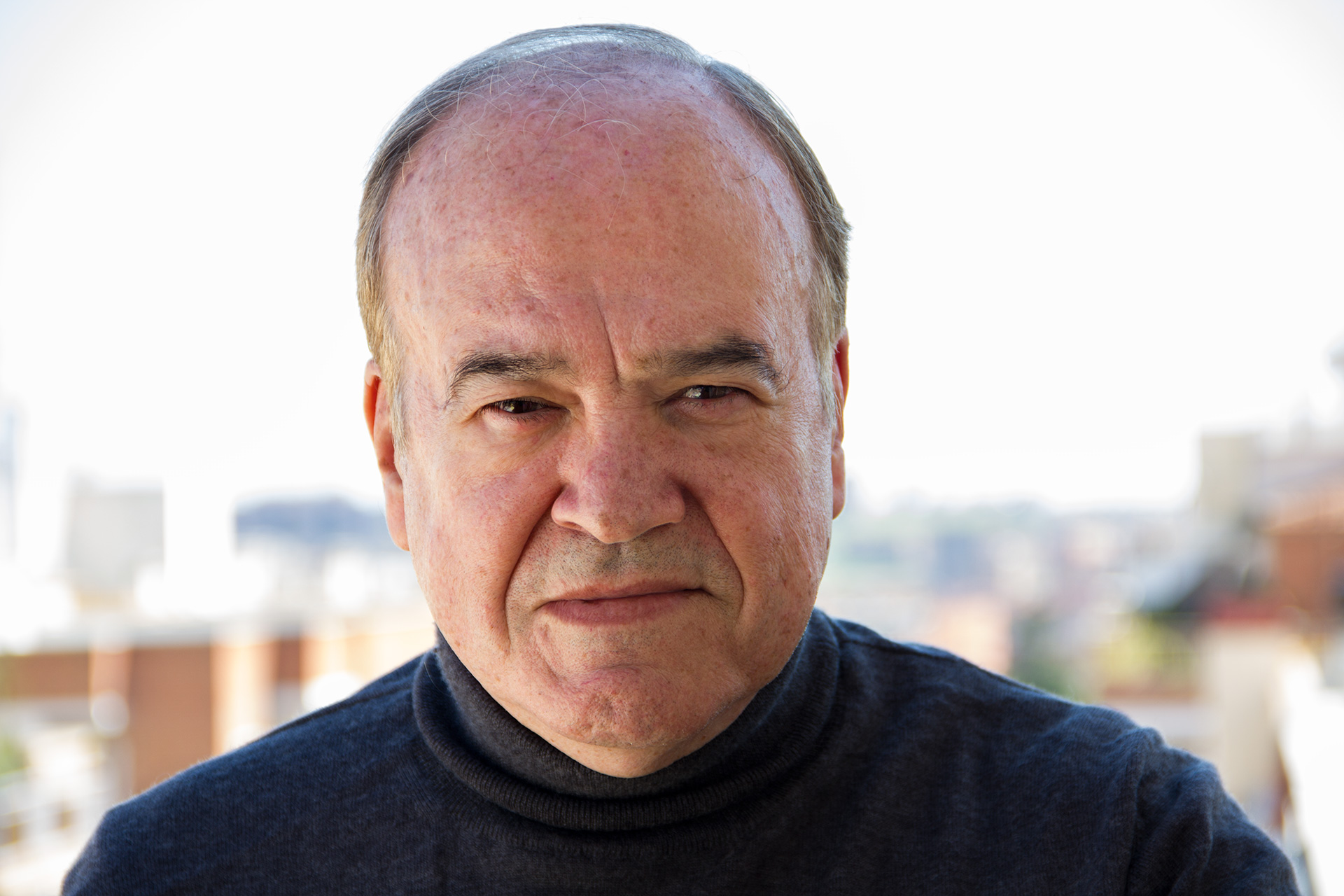
- Born: Madrid, Spain
- Education: Universidad Complutense, University of Edinburgh
- Occupations: journalist, sociologist, and political scientist
- Website: http://cchs.csic.es/en/personal/luis.moreno

Luis Moreno (Moreno Fernandez) (Madrid, 1950–2023) was a journalist, sociologist, and political scientist. He was an Emeritus Research Professor at the Spanish National Research Council (CSIC).

== Academic Biography ==
Graduate of the Universidad Complutense (Madrid), he was awarded his Ph.D. in Social Sciences at the University of Edinburgh. He has been visiting scholar at the universities of Colorado (CU-Boulder), Denver (DU), Edinburgh and Rome (La Sapienza) and the Institute for Research on Population and Social Policies (Italian National Research Council, CNR). He was Jean Monnet Senior Research Fellow at the European University Institute in Florence.

In Spain he was an invited professor at the Centro de Estudios Políticos y Constitucionales and the Universidad Internacional Menendez Pelayo.

Two are his long-standing lines of research: (a) Social policy and welfare state, and (b) Territorial politics (decentralization, federalism, nationalism and Europeanization). Both have been carried out from a comparative perspective. He has analysed the different ages of welfare development, and has also conceptualized the Mediterranean welfare regime within the European Social Model.

In his 1986 PhD dissertation he introduced in the Anglo-Saxon academic world what is known as ‘the Moreno Question’, by which a self-identification scale expressed by citizens in Scotland was meant to clarify social mobilization in the quest for political autonomy (‘Only Scottish, not British’; ‘More Scottish than British’; ‘Equally Scottish as British’; ‘More British than Scottish’; and ‘Only British, not Scottish).

He has been director of more than 20 research projects awarded by competitive sources by Spanish and European institutions. He has (co) authored nearly 30 books and more than 300 scientific texts. According to Google Scholar, he is the Spanish sociologist and political scientist most cited internationally.

His essay books, ‘Europe without States‘(2014), ‘Triennium of Changes‘ (2015), ‘Hazardous Societies’ (2017), and ‘Robotized democracies’ (& Raul Jimenez, 2018) analyse the changing times in Spain, Europe and the world. His latest book, ‘Behind Closed Doors. Views on Life Changes’ (& Raul Jimenez, 2021) deals with social effects induced by the Covid-19 pandemic.

== Profiles and academic links ==
- CSIC (IPP-CCHS)
- Academia.edu
- ResearchGate
- Google Scholar
- ORCID

== Libraries and repositories ==
- CSIC Library
- Digital CSIC
- Library of Congress
- La Catarata
- Siglo XXI
- Centro de Estudios Políticos y Constitucionales
- Península
- Aracne

== Op-Eds and Blogs ==
- Op-Eds, articles of opinion
- LSE Europp
- Centre on Constitutional Change
- EuVisions
