= African Romance =

Extinct Romance language of North Africa

- Region: Roman Africa (Africa Proconsularis/Mauretania Caesariensis/Mauretania Tingitana); Vandal Kingdom; Byzantine Africa (Praetorian prefecture/Exarchate of Africa); Mauro-Roman Kingdom; Maghreb/Ifriqiya
- Ethnicity: Roman Africans
- Era: c. 1st–15th century AD(?)
- Language family: Indo-European: Italic; Latino-Faliscan; Latin; Romance; Southern Romance?; African Romance
- Early forms: Old Latin: Vulgar Latin; Proto-Romance

Language codes
- ISO 639-3: None (mis)
- Linguist List: lat-afr
- Glottolog: None

African Romance, African Latin or Afroromance is an extinct Romance language that was spoken in the various coastal Mediterranean provinces of Roman North Africa by North African Romans under the later Roman Empire and its various post-Roman successor states in the region, including the Vandal Kingdom, the Byzantine-administered Exarchate of Africa and the Berber Mauro-Roman Kingdom. African Romance is poorly attested as it was mainly a spoken, vernacular language. There is little doubt, however, that by the early 3rd century AD, some native provincial variety of Latin was fully established in Northwestern Africa.

After the conquest of North Africa by the Umayyad Caliphate in 709 AD, this language survived through to the 8th century in various regions along the North African coast and the immediate littoral, with evidence that it may have persisted up to the 14th century, and possibly even the 15th century, or later in certain areas of the interior.

== History ==
=== Background ===
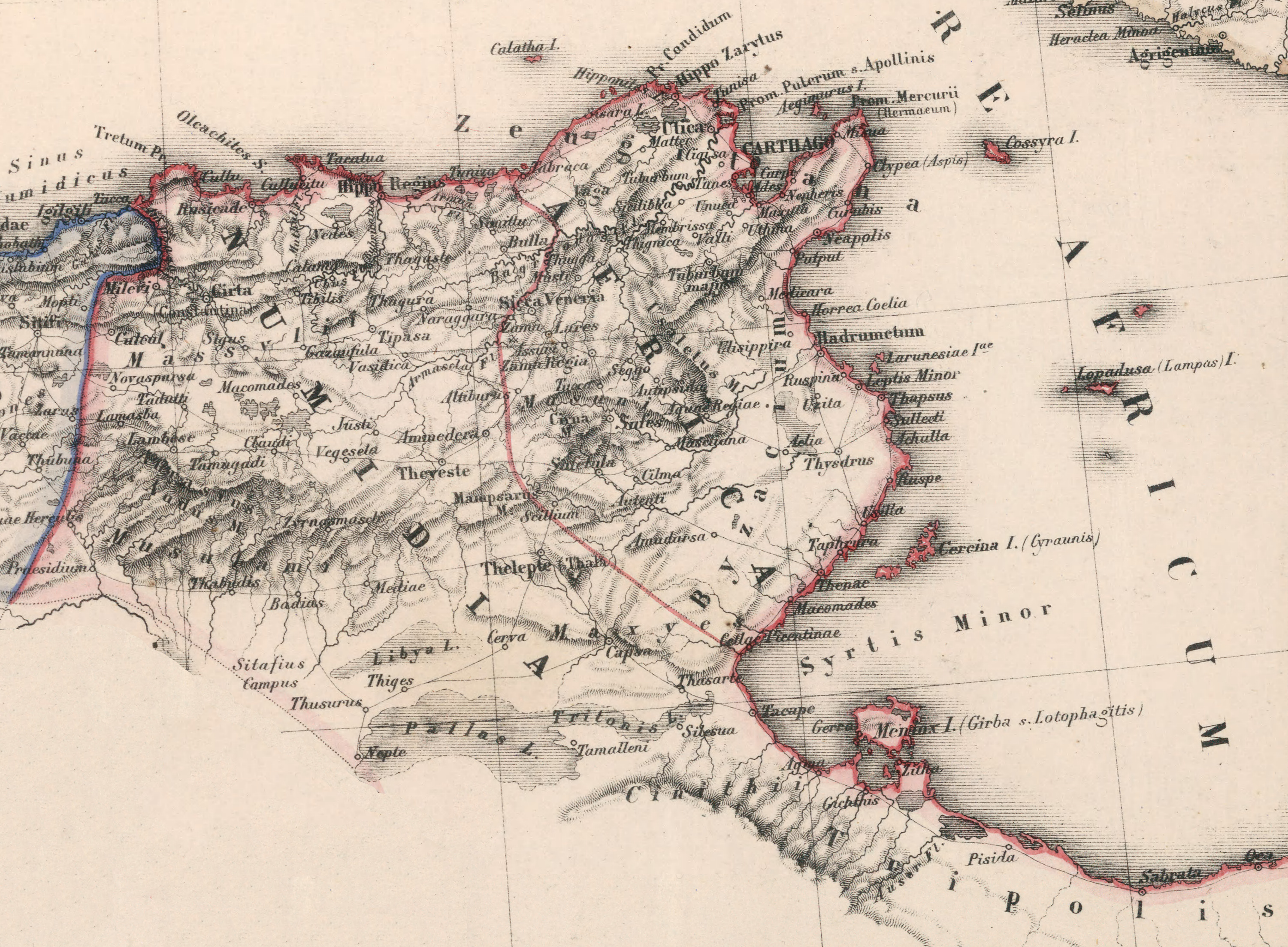
The Fossa regia (in pink) marked the approximate border between the province of Africa and Numidia.

The Roman province of Africa was organized in 146 BC following the defeat of Carthage in the Third Punic War. The city of Carthage, sacked following the war, was rebuilt during the dictatorship of Julius Caesar as a Roman colony, and by the 1st century, it had grown to be the fourth largest city of the empire, with a population in excess of 100,000 people. (Note: Likely the fourth city in terms of population during the imperial period, following Rome, Alexandria and Antioch, in the 4th century also surpassed by Constantinople; also of comparable size were Ephesus, Smyrna and Pergamum.) The Fossa regia was an important boundary in the northern Maghreb, originally separating the Roman-occupied Carthaginian territory from Numidia, and may have served as a cultural boundary indicating Romanization.

In the time of the Roman Empire, Latin became the coastal North Africa's second most-widely spoken language after Punic, which continued to be spoken in Carthaginian cities and rural areas as late as the mid-5th century. It is probable that Berber languages were also spoken in some areas. Funerary stelae chronicle the partial Romanization of art and religion in North Africa. Notable differences, however, existed in the penetration and survival of the Latin, Punic and Berber languages. These indicated regional differences: Neo-Punic had a revival in Tripolitania, around Hippo Regius there is a cluster of Libyan inscriptions, while in the mountainous regions of Kabylie and Aures, Latin was scarcer, though not absent.

North Africa was occupied by the Germanic Vandal tribe for over a century, between 429 and 534 AD, when the province was reconquered by the Byzantine Emperor Justinian I. The changes that occurred in spoken Latin during that time are unknown. Literary Latin, however, was maintained at a high standard, as seen in the Latin poetry of the North African writer Corippus. The areas surround Carthage remained fully Latin-speaking until the arrival of the Arabs.

=== Origins and development ===
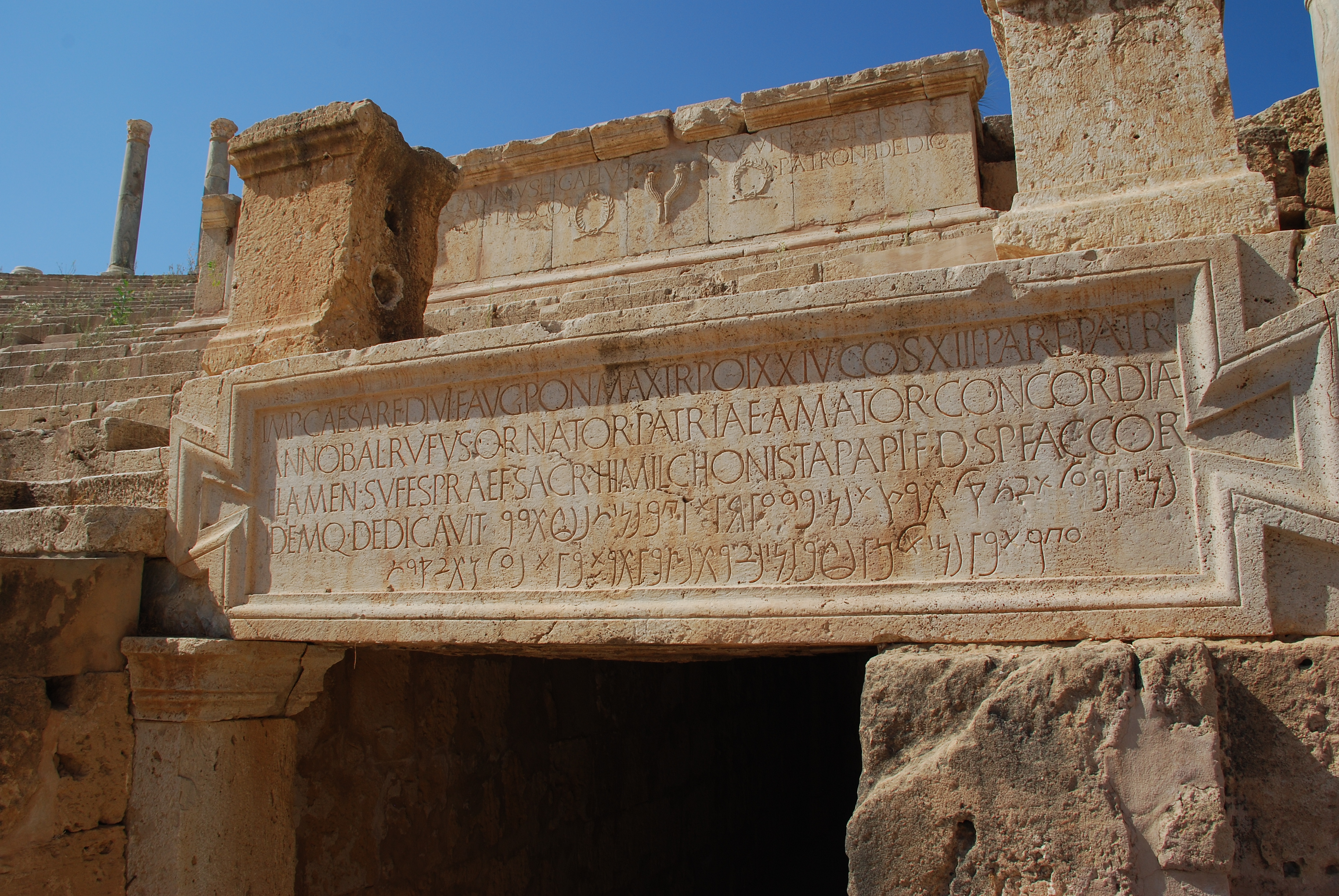
An inscription from one of the gates to the theatre at Leptis Magna, indicating that Latin and Punic co-existed in North Africa for centuries.

Like all Romance languages, African Romance descended from Vulgar Latin, the non-standard (in contrast to Classical Latin) form of the Latin language, which was spoken by soldiers and merchants throughout the Roman Empire. With the expansion of the empire, Vulgar Latin came to be spoken by inhabitants of the various Roman-controlled territories in North Africa. Latin and its descendants were spoken in the Province of Africa following the Punic Wars, when the Romans conquered the territory. Spoken Latin, and Latin inscriptions developed while Punic was still being used. Bilingual inscriptions were engraved, some of which reflect the introduction of Roman institutions into Africa, using new Punic expressions.

Latin, and then some Romance variants of it, was spoken by generations of speakers, for about fifteen centuries. This was demonstrated by North African-born speakers of African Romance who continued to create Latin inscriptions until the first half of the 11th century. Evidence for a spoken Romance variety which developed locally out of Latin persisted in rural areas of Tunisia – possibly as late as the last two decades of the 15th century in some sources.

By the late 19th century and early 20th century, the possible existence of African Latin was controversial, with debates on the existence of Africitas as a putative African dialect of Latin. In 1882, the German scholar Karl Sittl used unconvincing material to adduce features particular to Latin in North Africa. This unconvincing evidence was attacked by Wilhelm Kroll in 1897, and again by Madeline D. Brock in 1911. Brock went so far as to assert that "African Latin was free from provincialism", and that African Latin was "the Latin of an epoch rather than that of a country". This view shifted in recent decades, with modern philologists going so far as to say that African Latin "was not free from provincialism" and that, given the remoteness of parts of Africa, there were "probably a plurality of varieties of Latin, rather than a single African Latin". Other researchers believe that features peculiar to African Latin existed, but are "not to be found where Sittl looked for it".

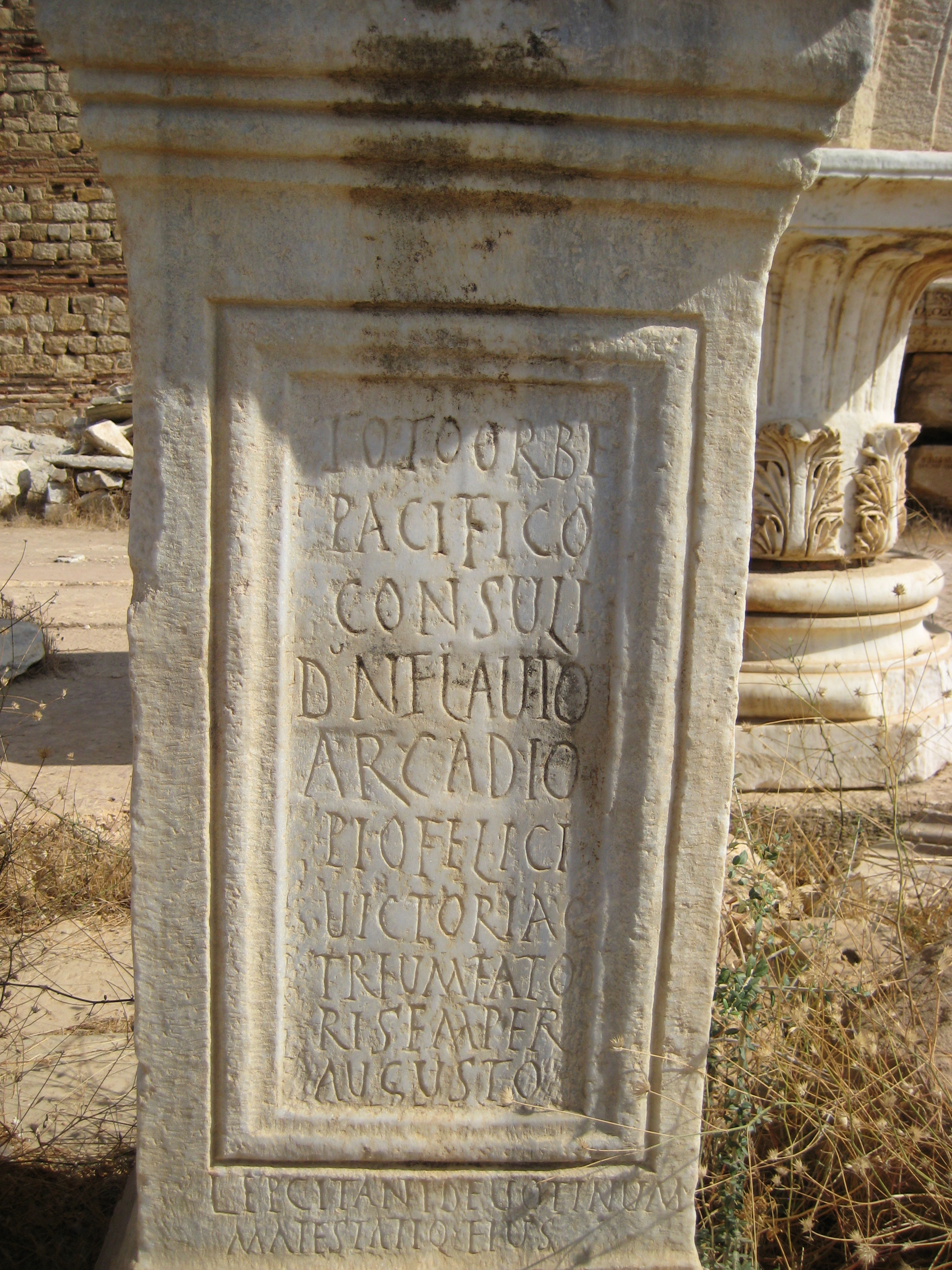
Fifth century AD inscription at the Leptis Magna forum, Libya.

While as a language African Romance is extinct, there is some evidence of regional varieties in African Latin that helps reconstruct some of its features. Some historical evidence on the phonetic and lexical features of the Afri were already observed in ancient times. Pliny observes how walls in North Africa's Maghreb and Spain are called formacei, or "framed walls, because they are made by packing in a frame enclosed between two boards, one on each side". Nonius Marcellus, a Roman grammarian, provides further, if uncertain, evidence regarding vocabulary and possible "Africanisms". (Note: Most of the 'Africanisms' mentioned by Nonius, as listed in Contini (1987) do not bear up to more modern analysis.) In the Historia Augusta, the North African Roman Emperor Septimius Severus is said to have retained an accent until old age. (Note: Latin: "...canorus voce, sed Afrum quiddam usque ad senectutem sonans.") More recent analysis focuses on a body of literary texts, being literary pieces written by African and non-African writers. These show the existence of an North African pronunciation of Latin, then moving on to a further study of lexical material drawn from sub-literary sources, such as practical texts and ostraca, from multiple North African communities, that is military writers, landholders and doctors.

The Romance philologist James Noel Adams lists a number of possible Africanisms found in this wider Latin literary corpus. Only two refer to constructions found in Sittl, with the other examples deriving from medical texts, various ostraca and other non-traditional sources. Two sorts of regional features can be observed. The first are loanwords from a substrate language, such is the case with Britain. In African Latin, this substrate was Punic. The dialect included words such as ginga for "henbane", boba for "mallow," girba for "mortar" and gelela for the inner flesh of a gourd. The second refers to use of Latin words with particular meanings not found elsewhere, or in limited contexts. Of particular note is the African Romance use of the word rostrum for "mouth" instead of the original meaning in Latin, which is "beak", and baiae for "baths" being a late Latin and particularly African generalisation from the place-name Baiae. Pullus meaning "cock" or "rooster", was probably borrowed by Berber dialects from African Romance, for use instead of the Latin gallus. The originally abstract word dulcor is seen applied as a probable medical African specialisation relating to sweet wine instead of the Latin passum or mustum. The Latin for grape, traditionally indeterminate (acinis), male (acinus) or neuter (acinum), in various African Latin sources changes to the feminine acina. Other examples include the use of pala as a metaphor for the shoulder blade; centenarium, which only occurs in the Albertini Tablets and may have meant "granary"; and infantilisms such as dida, which apparently meant "breast/nipple" or "wet nurse". A few African Latin loanwords from Punic, such as matta ("mat made of rushes", from which derives English "mat") and Berber, such as buda ("cattail") also spread into general Latin usage, the latter even displacing native Latin ulva.

Both North Africans, such as Augustine of Hippo and the grammarian Pompeius, as well as non-Africans, such as Consentius and Jerome, wrote on dialectal features, some in very specific terms. Indeed, in his De Ordine, dated to late 386, Augustine remarks how he was still criticised by the Italians for his pronunciation, while he himself often found fault with theirs. While modern scholars may express doubts on the interpretation or accuracy of some of these writings, they contend that African Latin must have been distinctive enough to inspire so much discussion.

=== Extinction ===
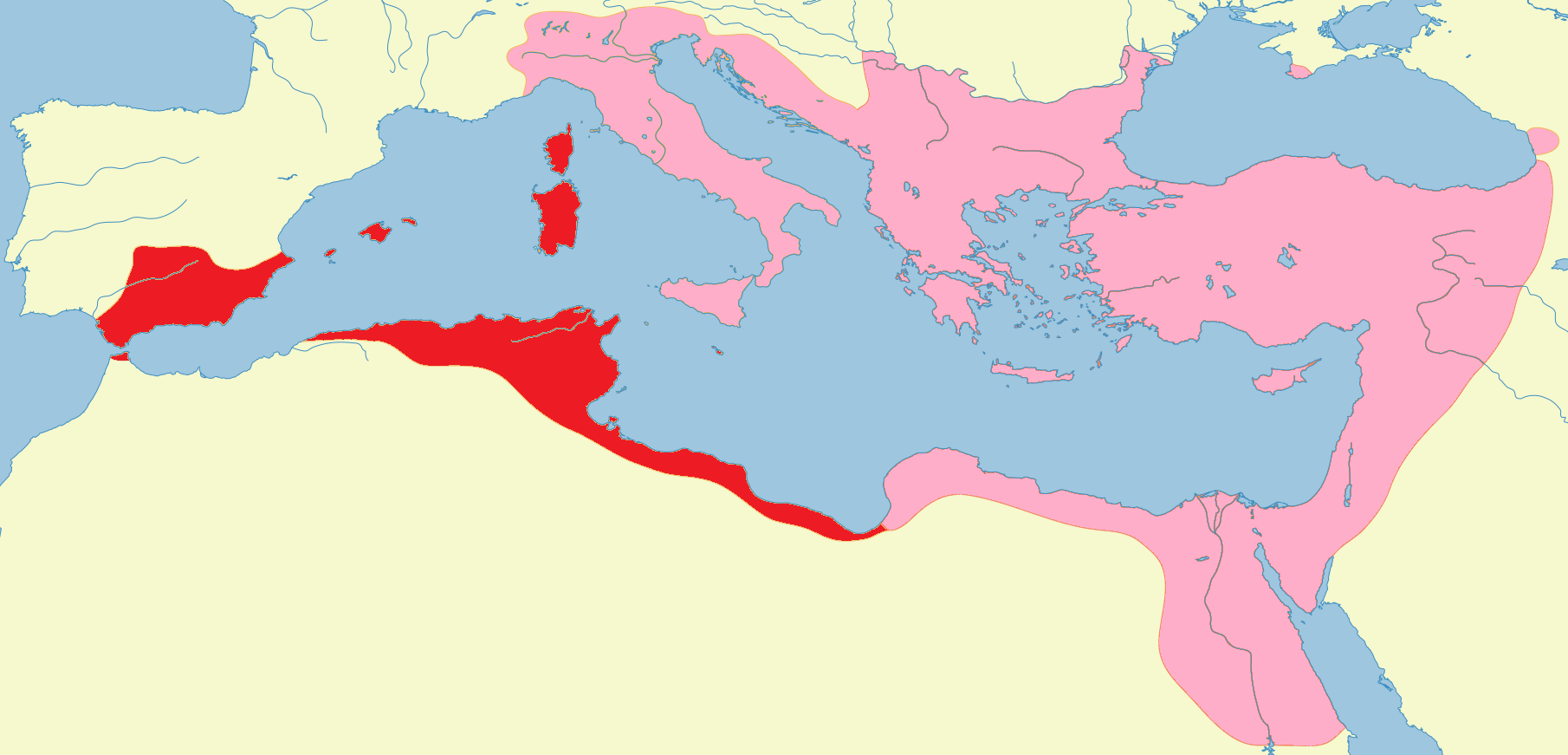
The Exarchate of Africa within the Byzantine Empire after the reconquest of Justinian.

Prior to the Arab conquest in 696–705 AD, a Romance language was probably spoken alongside Berber languages in the region. Loanwords from Northwest African Romance to Berber are attested, usually in the accusative form: examples include atmun ("plough-beam") from temonem.

Following the conquest, it becomes difficult to trace the fate of African Romance. The Umayyad administration did at first utilize the local Latin language in coinage from Carthage and Kairouan in the early 8th century, displaying Latin inscriptions of Islamic phrases such as D[e]us tu[us] D[e]us et a[li]us non e[st] ("God is your God and there is no other"), a variation of the shahada, or Muslim declaration of faith. Conant suggests that African Romance vernacular could have facilitated diplomatic exchange between Charlemagne and the Aghlabid emirate, as the Frankish-given name for the Aghlabid capital is Fossatum (Latin for fortifications) which is reflected in the name today Fusātū.

African Latin was soon replaced by Arabic as the primary administrative language, but it existed at least until the arrival of the Banu Hilal Arabs in the 11th century and probably until the beginning of the 14th century. It was spoken in various parts of the region's littoral into the 12th century, exerting a significant influence on Northwest African Arabic, particularly the language of northwestern Morocco.

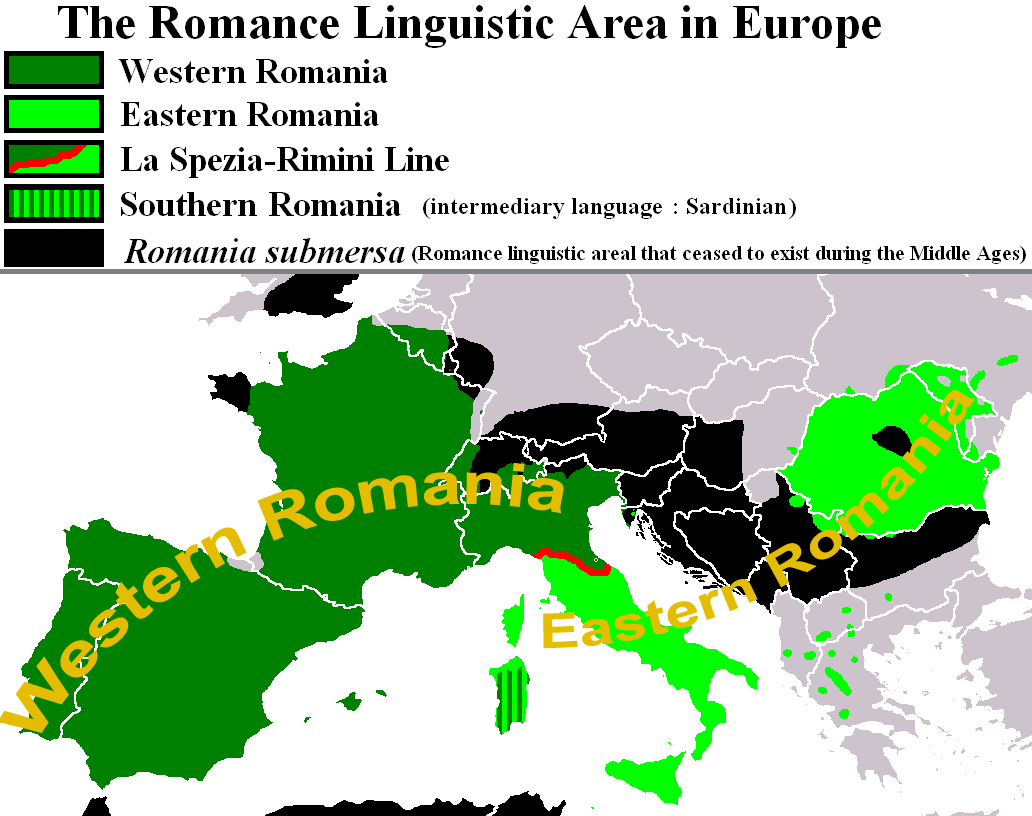
Map highlighting in black the "Romania submersa", being those Roman, or formerly Roman regions where forms of neo-Latin disappeared after some centuries, including Northern Africa.

Amongst the Berbers of Ifriqiya, African Romance was linked to Christianity, which survived in the northern Maghreb (outside of Egypt) until the 14th century. Christian cemeteries excavated in Kairouan dating from 945 to 1046 and in Áin Zára and En Ngila in Tripolitania from before the 10th century contain Latin inscriptions demonstrating continued use of written liturgical Latin centuries into Islamic rule; graves with Christian names such as Peter, John, Maria, Irene, Isidore, Speratus, Boniface, and Faustinus contain common phrases such as "requiem aeternam det tibi Dominus et lux perpetua luceat tibi ("May the Lord give you eternal rest and everlasting light shine upon you") or Deus Sabaoth from the Sanctus hymn. Another example attests to the dual usage of the Christian and the Hijri calendars, reading that the deceased died in Anno Domini 1007 or 397 annorum infidelium ("Years of the infidels".) There is also a Vetus Latina Psalter in Saint Catherine's Monastery dated to 1230, which has long been attributed to African origin due to its usage of African text and calendar of saints. The Psalter notably contains spellings consistent with Vulgar Latin/African Romance features (see below), such as prothetic i insertion, repeated betacism in writing b for v and substituting second declension endings to undeclinable Semitic biblical names. Written Latin continued to be the language of correspondence between African bishops and the Papacy up till the final communication between Pope Gregory VII and the imprisoned archbishop of Carthage, Cyriacus in the 11th century.

Spoken Latin or Romance is attested in Gabès by Ibn Khordadbeh; in Béja, Biskra, Tlemcen, and Niffis by al-Bakri; and in Gafsa and Monastir by al-Idrisi, who observes that the people in Gafsa "are Berberised, and most of them speak the African Latin tongue." (Note: Arabic: "وأهلها متبربرون وأكثرهم يتكلّم باللسان اللطيني الإفريقي" wa-ahluhā mutabarbirūn wa-aktharuhum yatakallam bil-lisān al-laṭīnī al-ifrīqī)

Al-Idrisi described the city of Gafsa in the 12th century:

The city of Gafsa is a fine city, surrounded by a wall ... Its inhabitants are largely Berbers, and most of them speak the Latin-African tongue.

In the passage, Al-Idrisi mentions that "there is a fountain called al-ṭarmid", which could derive from Latin word therma ("hot bath".)

There is also a possible reference to spoken Latin or African Romance in the 11th century, when the Rustamid governor Abu Ubayda Abd al-Hamid al-Jannawni was said to have sworn his oath of office in Arabic, Berber and in an unspecified "town language", which might be interpreted as a Romance variety; in the oath, the Arabic-rendered phrase bar diyyu could represent some variation of Latin per Deu(m) ("by God".) In their quest to conquer the Kingdom of Africa in the 12th century, the Normans were aided by the remaining Christian population of Tunisia, who some linguists, among them Vermondo Brugnatelli, argue had been speaking a Romance language for centuries.

The final attestations of African Romance come from the Renaissance period. The 15th century Italian humanist Paolo Pompilio makes the most significant remarks on the language and its features, reporting that a Catalan merchant named Riaria who had lived in North Africa for thirty years told him that the villagers in the Aurès mountain region "speak an almost intact Latin and, when Latin words are corrupted, then they pass to the sound and habits of the Sardinian language". The 16th century geographer and diplomat Leo Africanus, who was born into a Muslim-Andalusi family in Granada and fled the Reconquista to Morocco, also says that North Africans retained their own language after the Islamic conquest which he calls "Italian", which must refer to Romance. A statement by Mawlā Aḥmad is sometimes interpreted as implying the survival of a Christian community in Tozeur into the eighteenth century, but this is unlikely; Prevost estimates that Christianity disappeared around the middle of the thirteenth century in southern Tunisia.

== Classification ==
=== Sardinian hypothesis ===
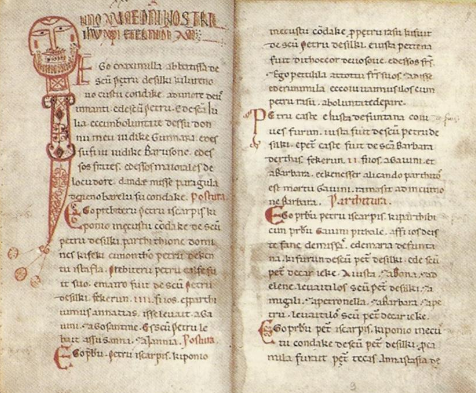
The condaghe of Saint Peter of Silki (1065–1180), one of the first documents written in Sardinian.

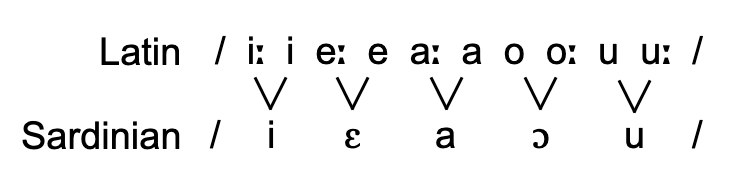
Vowel changes from Latin to Sardinian, theorized to have been shared with African Romance

The most prominent theory for the classification of African Romance (at least for the interior province of Africa Proconsularis) is that it belonged to a shared subgroup along with Sardinian, called Southern Romance by some linguists. This branch of Romance, of which Sardinian would today be the only surviving member, could have also been spoken in the medieval period in Corsica prior to the island's Tuscanization, southern Basilicata (eastern region of the Lausberg area) and perhaps other regions in southern Italy, Sicily and possibly even Malta.

A potential linguistic relationship between Sardinia and North Africa could have been built up as a result of the two regions' long pre-Roman cultural ties starting from the 8th–7th centuries BC, when the island fell under the Carthaginian sphere of influence. This resulted in the Punic language being spoken in Sardinia up to the 3rd–4th centuries AD, and several Punic loan-words survive into modern Sardinian. Cicero also mocks Sardinia's perceived Carthaginian and African cultural identity as the source of its inferiority and disloyalty to Rome. (Note: "Fallacissimum genus esse Phoenicum omnia monumenta vetustatis atque omnes historiae nobis prodiderunt. ab his orti Poeni multis Carthaginiensium rebellionibus, multis violatis fractisque foederibus nihil se degenerasse docuerunt. A Poenis admixto Afrorum genere Sardi non deducti in Sardiniam atque ibi constituti, sed amandati et repudiati coloni. [...] Neque ego, cum de vitiis gentis loquor, neminem excipio; sed a me est de universo genere dicendum, in quo fortasse aliqui suis moribus et humanitate stirpis ipsius et gentis vitia vicerunt. magnam quidem esse partem sine fide, sine societate et coniunctione nominis nostri res ipsa declarat. quae est enim praeter Sardiniam provincia quae nullam habeat amicam populo Romano ac liberam civitatem? Africa ipsa parens illa Sardiniae, quae plurima et acerbissima cum maioribus nostris bella gessit." "Cicero: Pro Scauro". ("All the monuments of the ancients and all histories have handed down to us the tradition that the nation of the Phoenicians is the most treacherous of all nations. The Poeni, who are descended from them, have proved by many rebellions of the Carthaginians, and very many broken and violated treaties, that they have in no respect degenerated from them. The Sardinians, who are sprung from the Poeni, with an admixture of African blood, were not led into Sardinia as colonists and established there, but are rather a tribe who were draughted off, and put there to get rid of them. Nor indeed, when I speak of the vices of the nation, do I except no one. But I am forced to speak generally of the entire race; in which, perhaps, some individuals by their own civilized habits and natural humanity have got the better of the vices of their family and nation. That the greater part of the nation is destitute of faith, destitute of any community and connection with our name, the facts themselves plainly show. For what province is there besides Sardinia which has not one city in it on friendly terms with the Roman people, not one free city? Africa itself is the parent of Sardinia, which has waged many most bitter wars against our ancestors." Translation by C. D. Yonge, B. A. London. Henry G. Bohn, York Street, Covent Garden. 1856, "Perseus Digital Library".)) The affinity between the two regions persisted after the collapse of the Western Roman Empire under shared governance by the Vandal Kingdom and then the Byzantine Exarchate of Africa. Pinelli believes that the Vandal presence had "estranged Sardinia from Europe, linking its own destiny to Africa's territorial expanse" in a bond that was to strengthen further "under Byzantine rule, not only because the Roman Empire included the island in the African Exarchate, but also because it developed from there, albeit indirectly, its ethnic community, causing it to acquire many of the African characteristics".

The spoken variety of African Romance was perceived to be similar to Sardinian as reported in the above-cited passage by Paolo Pompilio (Note: Latin: «ubi pagani integra pene latinitate loquuntur et, ubi uoces latinae franguntur, tum in sonum tractusque transeunt sardinensis sermonis, qui, ut ipse noui, etiam ex latino est» ("where villagers speak an almost intact Latin and, when Latin words are corrupted, then they pass to the sound and habits of the Sardinian language, which, as I myself know, also comes from Latin")) – supporting hypotheses that there were parallelisms between developments of Latin in Africa and Sardinia. Although this testimony comes from a secondhand source, the Catalan merchant Riaria, these observations are reliable since Sardinia was under Catalan rule by the Crown of Aragon, so the merchant could have had the opportunity to trade in both regions.

Augustine of Hippo writes that "[North] African ears have no quick perception of the shortness or length of [Latin] vowels". (Note: Latin: «Afrae aures de correptione vocalium vel productione non iudicant» ("African ears show no judgement in the matter of the shortening of vowels or their lengthening")) This also describes the evolution of vowels in Sardinian. Sardinian has only five vowels, and no diphthongs; unlike the other surviving Romance languages, the five long vowel pairs of Classical Latin, ā, ē, ī, ō, ū (phonetically [aː, eː, iː, oː, uː]), merged with their corresponding short vowel counterparts ă, ĕ, ĭ, ŏ, ŭ [a, ɛ, ɪ, ɔ, ʊ] into five single vowels with no length distinction: /a, ɛ, i, ɔ, u/. (Note: German: "Es wäre auch möglich, daß die Sarden die lat. Quantitäten von vornherein nicht recht unterschieden." ("It is likely that the Sardinians had never differentiated well from the beginning the Latin quantities.")) In the Italo-Western Romance varieties, short ǐ, ŭ [ɪ, ʊ] merged with long ē, ō [e(ː), o(ː)] instead of with long ī, ū [i(ː), u(ː)] as in Sardinian, which typically resulted in a seven vowel system, for example /a, ɛ, e, i, ɔ, o, u/ in Italian.

Adams theorises that similarities in some vocabulary, such as pala ("shoulderblade") and acina ("grape") across Sardinian and African Romance, or spanu in Sardinian and spanus ("light red") in African Romance, may be evidence that some vocabulary was shared between Sardinia and Africa. A further theory suggests that the Sardinian word for "Friday", cenàpura or chenàpura (literally "pure dinner", in reference to parasceve, or Friday preparation for the Sabbath), may have been brought to Sardinia by North African Jews. The term cena pura is used by Augustine, although there is no evidence that its meaning in Africa extended beyond the Jewish religious context to simply refer to the day of Friday. It is further speculated that the Sardinian word for the month of June, lámpadas ("lamps"), could have a connection to African usage due to references by Fulgentius and in a work on the Nativity of John the Baptist to a dies lampadarum ("day of the lamps") during the harvest in June. Celebrations on the Feast of St. John the Baptist involving torches appear to have been Christianized solstice ceremonies originally dedicated to Ceres, and have also been attested in Spain by Rodrigo Caro as lámpara and in Portugal as São João das Lampas ("St. John of the Torches"). There is also possible evidence of shared Sardinian and African Latin vocabulary in that Latin cartallus ("basket") results in the unique Sardinian word iscarteddu and Maghrebi Arabic gertella. Additionally, it is notable that Sardinian is the only Romance language in which the name for the Milky Way, sa (b)ía de sa bálla / báza, meaning "the Way of Straw", also occurs in Berber languages, hinting at a possible African Romance connection.

Blasco Ferrer suggests that the Latin demonstrative ipse/-a, from which derive both the Sardinian definite article su/sa as well as the subject personal pronouns isse/-a, could have syncretized with the Berber feminine prefix ta in African Latin. Apart from Sardinian, the only other Romance varieties which take their article from ipse/-a (instead of ille/-a) are the Catalan dialects of the Balearic Islands, certain areas of Girona, the Vall de Gallerina and Tàrbena, Provençal and medieval Gascon. Blasco Ferrer proposes that usage of ipse/-a was preferred over ille/-a in North Africa under southern Italian influence, as observed in the 2nd century Act of the Scillitan Martyrs (Passio Scillitanorum) which substitutes ipse/-a for ille/-a. This dialectal form then could have developed into *tsa, which is attested in Old Catalan documents like the Homilies d'Organyà (e.g. za paraula: "the words"), and traversed the Mediterranean from the northern Maghreb (Mauretania) to Sardinia, the Balearics, and southern Gaul. The justification for positing Berber ta as possibly derivative of ipsa is that its allophonic pronunciation is [θa], which is often the phonetic outcome in Berber of [tsa]. However, the connection between ipsa and ta remains highly speculative and without direct evidence.

Writing in the 12th century, Muhammad al-Idrisi additionally observes cultural similarities between Roman Sardinians and Roman North Africans, saying that "the Sardinians are ethnically Roman Africans, live like the Berbers, shun any other nation of Rûm; these people are courageous and valiant, that never part with their weapons." (Note: Arabic: وأهل جزيرة سردانية في أصل روم أفارقة متبربرون متوحشون من أجناس الروم وهم أهل نجدة وهزم لا يفرقون السلاح (Wa-ahl Jazīrat Sardānīyah fī aṣl Rūm Afāriqah mutabarbirūn mutawaḥḥishūn min ajnās ar-Rūm wa-hum ahl najidah wa-hazm lā yufariqūn as-silāḥ))

=== Other theories ===
==== Southern Mediterranean Latin dialectal unity: North Africa, Sardinia, Sicilia, and Hispania ====
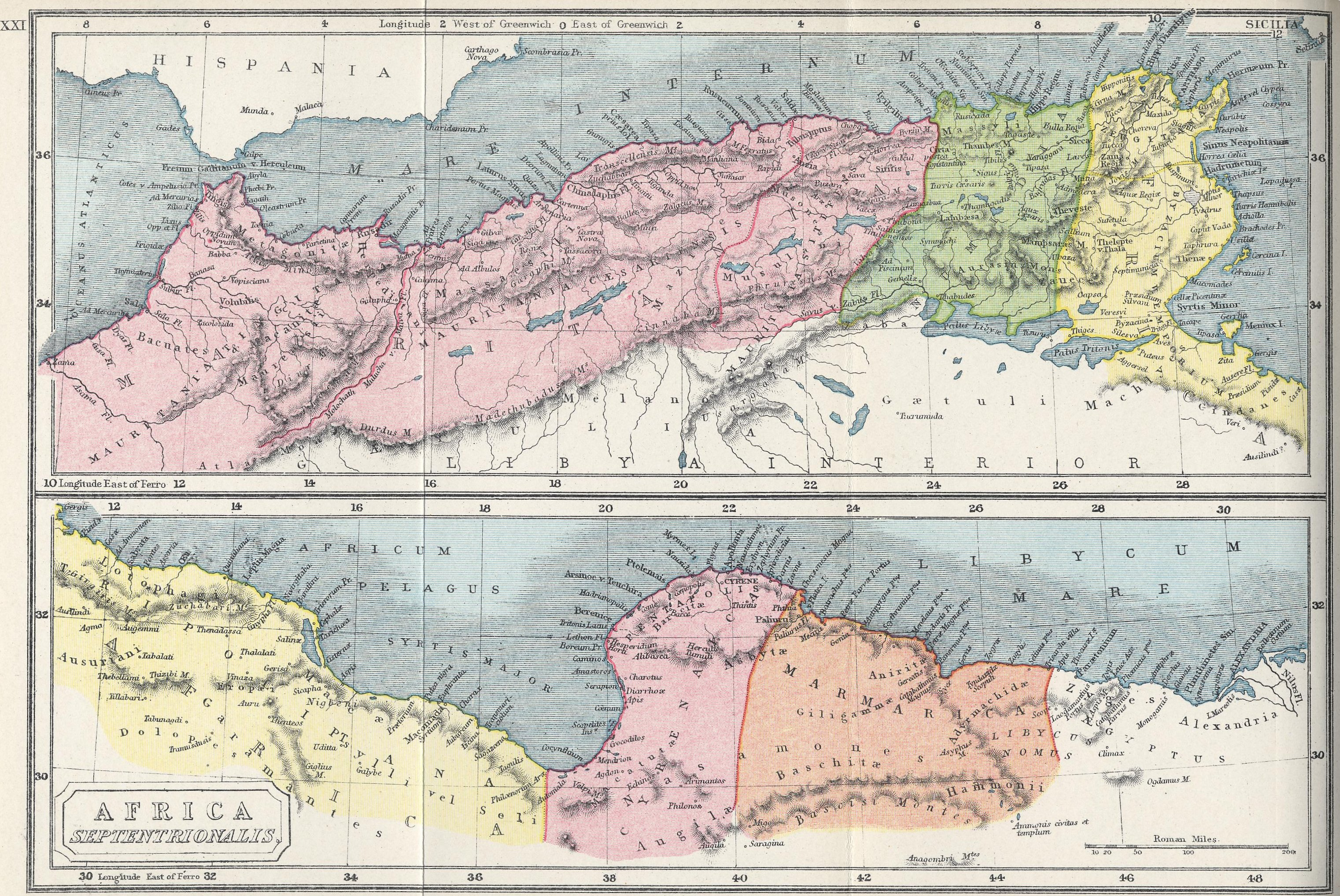
Map showing the provincial division of Roman North Africa: Mauretania, Numidia and Africa

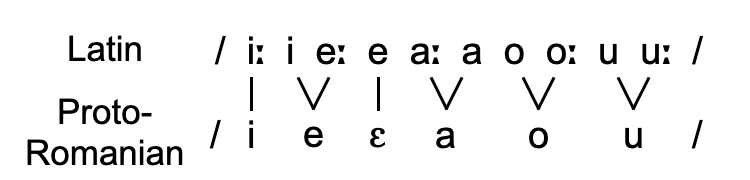
Vowel changes from Latin to Romanian, which one scholar suggests as a possible path of development for the Latin of Mauretania.

There is also possible evidence of dialectal unity across the Latin-speaking southern Mediterranean, from Hispania to Mauretania (Morocco), Numidia (Algeria), and the Roman province of Africa (Tunisia), to Sardinia and Sicily. Although Sicilian is typically not included in the Southern Romance group due to its distinct vocalism from the Afro-Sardinian outcome, Sicily, parts of Southern Italy (particularly Southern Basilicata, within the Lausberg area, Sardinia and Corsica (prior to the island's Tuscanization) and perhaps even Malta could have at one time formed a Latin/Romance dialectal continuum.

Blasco Ferrer hypothesizes that Africa, as a center of literary prestige (home of renowned writers like Ammianus Marcellinus, Appianus, Terence, Tertullian and St. Augustine) and agricultural importance, could have been the origination point of a number of linguistic developments which then spread northwards to Sardinia, Southern Italy and Spain. African Latin, Sardinian, Sicilian and Hispano-Romance appear to share certain characteristics dating from the pre-Roman and Roman periods. Influences from the unknown pre-Roman non-or early Indo-European "Mediterran substratum" found across all four regions include the use of the suffix -itanus to indicate ethnicity (e.g., in Africa Aggaritani, Assalitani, Belalitani; in Hispania Aurgitani, Ausetani, Bastetani, Calagurritani; in Sardinia Caralitani, Celsitani, Giddilitani, Campitani, Sulcitani; in Sicily Drepanitani, Gaulitani, Hadranitani, Liparitani, as well as placenames Locritano and Reitano in Calabria) and the occasionally the suffix -ara to indicate plurality (e.g., in Africa Mákaras, Biracsáccara; in Hispania Bràcana/Bràcara, Làncara; in Egara, Gàndara, Tàbara, Tàmara, in Sardinia Màndara, Ardara; in Sicily, Hykkara, Indara, Màcara, Lípara/i, Màzara.)

Common Latin-internal linguistic developments found in the northern Maghreb, Sardinia and Sicily, which could have radiated out to the islands from the African Latin dialect, include the tendency to lose /u/ in the 2nd declension -ius/-ium endings (e.g., Valerius > Valeris, Ianuarius > Ianuaris, Martius > Martis, Nasidi(u)s, Superi(u)s; in Sicily, Salusi(us), Taracius > Tarasi(us), Laeli(us), Blasi(us); Vitali(u)s; in Sardinia, cinisium > ginisi (as well as the last-name Sanginisi); in Sardinia, Vitali(u)s, Simpliki, Sissini); Antoni and sporadic voicing of initial /g/ (e.g., in Africa, Quiza > Maghrebi Arabic Giza/Guzza, communes > gommunes; in Sicily, ginisi, Sanginisi, San Ginesio (toponym); in Sardinia, ghinisu, Lat. carricare, carduus > garrigare, gardu. Further, the replacement of the 3rd declension suffix -ensis for place origin with a 2nd declensions variant *-ensus is attested only in Sardinia (e.g. campidanesu, logudoresu) and in Africa (Arnensis > Arnensus.) Also, it is noted that the conservation of final /s/, found today in Sardinian and Lucanian, is attested in Maghrebi/Siculo-Arabic loanwords from African Latin (e.g., capis > qābis; ad badias > Bādiş, Badeş; casas > qāsās, comes > k.mm.s; cellas > k.llas and Sicilian (e.g., cannes > qan(n)es; capras > q.br.s; triocalis > t.r.q.l.s) (see below for details.)

In the area of vocabulary, Blasco Ferrer believes based on the above-mentioned phonetic developments and geographic restriction to either Sicily, parts of Calabria or Sardinia that the lexical variants *cinisium ("ash", yielding Sardinian ghinisu, Sicilian ginisi) instead of standard Latin cinis (> Italian cenere), opacus + *cupus ("dark", yielding Sicilian and Calabrian accupàri, accupúsu, occúpu, capúne, Sardinian baccu) and opacus + vacuus (yielding Sardinian baccu), variants of ficatum ("liver") with stress shift to the initial syllable (e.g., ['fi:katũ]), yielding Central Sardinian fìcatu, ìcatu, Sicilian and Calabrian fìccatu, Spanish hígado, must have radiated northward from Africa.

==== Hispano-Romance ====
Some scholars also theorise that many of the North African invaders of Hispania in the Early Middle Ages spoke some form of African Romance, with "phonetic, morphosyntactic, lexical and semantic data" from African Romance appearing to have contributed in the development of Ibero-Romance." It is suggested that African Latin betacism may have pushed the phonological development of Ibero-Romance varieties in favor of the now characteristic Spanish b/v merger as well as influencing the lengthening of stressed short vowels (after the loss of vowel length distinction) evidenced in lack of diphthongization of short e/o in certain words (such as teneo > tengo ("I have"), pectus > pecho ("chest"), mons > monte ("mountain".) In the area of vocabulary, it is possible that the meaning of rostrum (originally "bird beak") may have changed to mean "face" (of humans or animals), as in Spanish rostro, under the influence of African usage, and the African Latin-exclusive word centenarium ("granary") may have yielded the names of two towns in Huesca called Centenero. Adamik also finds evidence for dialectological similarity between Hispania and Africa based on rates of errors in the case system, a relation which could have increased from the 4th–6th centuries AD but was disrupted by the Islamic invasion.

=== Eastern Romance-type vocalism in Mauretania ===
Some evidence could point towards an alternate development for the Latin spoken in the province of Mauretania in the northwestern Maghreb (northern Morocco). Although agreeing with previous studies that the Late Latin of the interior province of Africa Proconsularis certainly displayed Sardinian vocalism, Adamik argues based on inscriptional evidence that the vowel system was not uniform across the entirety of the North African coast, and there is some indication that the Latin variety of Mauretania Caesariensis was possibly changing in the direction of the asymmetric six-vowel system found in Eastern Romance languages such as Romanian: /a, ɛ, e, i, o, u/. In Eastern Romance, on the front vowel axis short ǐ [ɪ] merged with long ē [e(ː)] as /e/ while keeping short ĕ /ɛ/ as a separate phoneme (as in Italo-Western Romance), and on the back vowel axis short ŭ [ʊ] merged with long ū [u(ː)], while short ŏ [ɔ] merged with long ō [o(ː)] as /o/ (similar to in Sardinian.) Due to the vast size of Roman territory in Africa, it is indeed plausible (if not likely) based on the analysis above that multiple distinct Romance languages had evolved there from Latin.

=== Influence on Berber and Maghrebi Arabic ===
Scholars including Brugnatelli and Kossmann have identified at least 40 words in various Berber dialects which are certain to have been loans from Latin or African Romance. For example, in Ghadames the word "anǧalus" (ⴰⵏⴳⴰⵍⵓⵙ, أندجالوس) refers to a spiritual entity, clearly using a word from the Latin angelus "angel". A complete list of Latin/Romance loanwords is provided below under the section on Berber vocabulary.

Some impacts of African Romance on Maghrebi Arabic and Maltese are theorised. For example, in calendar month names, the word furar "February" is only found in the Maghreb and in the Maltese language – proving the word's ancient origins. The region also has a form of another Latin named month in awi/ussu < augustus. This word does not appear to be a loan word through Arabic, and may have been taken over directly from Late Latin or African Romance. Scholars theorise that a Latin-based system provided forms such as awi/ussu and furar, with the system then mediating Latin/Romance names through Arabic for some month names during the Islamic period. The same situation exists for Maltese which mediated words from Italian, and retains both non-Italian forms such as awissu/awwissu and frar, and Italian forms such as april. Lameen Souag likewise compares several Maltese lexical items with Maghrebi Arabic forms to show that these words were borrowed directly from African Latin, rather than Italian or Sicilian. Bumerin ("seal"), coming from Latin bos marinus ("sea cow"), matches Dellys bū-mnīr and Moroccan bū-mrīn. In the case of Maltese berdlieqa ("purslane") from Latin portulaca, equivalent Arabic words are found throughout North Africa and former al-Andalus, including bǝrdlāqa in Dellys, bardilāqaš in Andalusi Arabic and burṭlāg in the desert regions of El Oued. As mentioned above, the Maghrebi Arabic word gertella ("basket"), from Latin cartallus, could also hint at a promising African Romance-Sardinian lexical connection with the unique Sardinian word iscarteddu.

Scholars have also theorized African Latin/Romance substrate influence on Maghrebi Arabic morphology. Heath has suggested that the archaic Moroccan Arabic genitive particle d could have derived from Latin de, as in Romance languages, although this structure is absent from Maltese and other Maghrebi Arabic varieties, making theory controversial. Further, certain northern Moroccan Arabic dialects have plural inflections in -ɘš/-oš, which appear to be borrowed from Latin acc pl -os (having survived as the sole plural inflection in Western Romance and Sardinian.) Corriente has also suggested that the loss of gender inflection in 2nd person pronouns and verbs in Maghrebi and Andalusi Arabic as well as Maltese could be due to Romance interference.

== Phonology ==
=== Diachronic ===
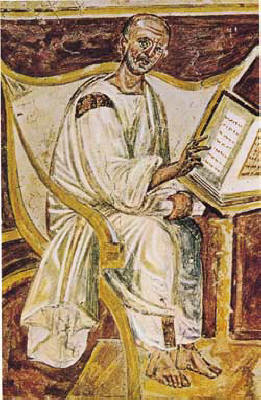
The earliest known portrait of Saint Augustine in a 6th-century fresco, Lateran, Rome.

Starting from African Romance's similarity with Sardinian, scholars theorise that the similarity may be pinned down to specific phonological properties. Logudorese Sardinian lacks palatization of velar stops before front vowels, and features the pairwise merger of short and long non-low vowels. Evidence is found that both isoglosses were present in at least certain varieties of African Latin:

- Velar stops also remain unaffected in Latin loanwords in Berber. For example, tkilsit ("mulberry tree") < (morus) celsa in Latin, and i-kīkər ("chickpea") < cicer in Latin, or ig(e)r, ("field") < ager in Latin.
- Inscriptions from Tripolitania, written as late as the 10th or 11th century are written with a ⟨k⟩ before both front and back vowels, pointing towards the pronunciation /k/ in all environments. Thus, there are forms with k written before front vowels, such as dikite ("say", 2pl imperative), iaket ("he/she lies down"), dekember ("December"), pake ("peace"), lukeat ("may shine", 3sgl subjunctive), dekesit ("he/she went away/died"), okisum ("killed"), bikeisima ("twentieth"), loki ("the places", or "of the place"), innok(en)s ("innocent"), dulkissimus ("most sweet"), rekessit ("he/she rests") and rekiebit ("he/she rested".) These occur alongside examples written before back vowels or consonants, such as dilektus ("beloved"), karus ("dear") and Afrikana ("African").
- Examples from Arabic loanwords which might show preserved /k, g/ before front vowels include cellas > klās, centenarium > qntnār/qntrār and cellula > glūla.
- On the other hand, there is also possible evidence to the contrary, of Berber and Maghrebi Arabic loanwards from Latin which might appear to display palatalization before e/i, transcribing k/g with ج. Examples in Maghrebi Arabic include: Aegimurus > ǧāmur, Tigisi > tīǧs, Georgius > ǧrǧ, Geminus > ǧamūna, Carthagine(m) > qrtāǧana, Centenum > 'ššenti (also Berber išenti / taššentīt), Hallece > al-lāǧ, Cellula > ǧlūlā (existing alongside the above-cited form glūlā.) However, there is uncertainty about the reliability of ج as transcriptions of the exact Latin/Romance sounds since Maghrebi Arabic at the time lacked /g/. Therefore, there are also examples of transcriptions of /k, g/ in clearly non-palatalizing contexts with ج, e.g. ecclesia > īǧlīz, (villa) magna > flmǧna, nigru(m) > nǧrū.
- Nevertheless, Fanciullo believes that a split palatalization of /g/ and not /k/ is plausible (compare how Dalmatian varieties may show palatalization before /i/ but not /e/), and perhaps western African Romance varieties (closer to Spain) could have palatalized /k, g/ while eastern African Romance varieties could have conserved /k, g/ (It is also believed that palatalization of /g/ preceded that of /k/, possibly by several centuries based on epigraphic evidence.) Note also, regarding Sardinian comparisons, that only northern Logudorese dialects lack /k, g/ palatalization, while southern Campidanese does have palatalization: e.g., Lat. centum, caelum, piscem > Logudorese "chentu", "chelu", "pische", but Campidanese "centu", "celu", "pisci".
- Fanciullo's suggestion of an east–west geographic dialectal split in African Latin outcomes of /k, g/ is undermined, however, by the observation that Berber loanwords with non-palatalized /k, g/ occur all across North Africa, from ikiker in Morocco (Tashelhiyt, iger in Morocco and Algeria, to amerkidu/amarkidu Ouargla and Shawiya tkilsa in Algeria and Ancient Nafusi in Libya.
- The Islamic-period African Psalter from Sinai does contain the spelling gisum for iesum, as another possible indication of a palatalized /g/ before front vowels.
- There is evidence for betacism in Latin words with "v" often being written with a "b" in African Romance, as reported by Isidore of Seville: birtus ("virtue") < virtus in Latin, boluntas ("will") < voluntas, and bita ("life") < vita. (Note: Latin: "Birtus, boluntas, bita vel his similia, quæ Afri scribendo vitiant...") Adams and Adamik both observe frequent b/v confusions in inscriptions and non-literary documents from Africa Proconsularis. On the other hand, according to Adamik, Mauretania Caesariensis shows a much lower rate of betacism, comparable to Hispania or Gaul.
- The 5th century Albertini Tablets suggest high levels of phonetic errors and an uncertainty in the use of Latin cases.
- In a study of errors on stressed vowels in a corpus of 279 inscriptions, scholars noted how African inscriptions confused between over-stressed and under-stressed vowels between the 1st and 4th century AD, with Rome reaching comparable error rates only by the late 4th to 6th centuries.
- As aforementioned, there is strong evidence that the Latin/Romance of Africa Proconsularis shared an identical five-vowel system (probably /a, ɛ, i, ɔ, u/) with Sardinian. Augustine of Hippo's testimony on how ōs ("mouth") in Latin was to African ears indistinguishable from ŏs ("bone") indicates the merger of vowels and the loss of the original allophonic quality distinction in vowels. (Note: Latin: "cur pietatis doctorem pigeat imperitis loquentem ossum potius quam os dicere, ne ista syllaba non ab eo, quod sunt ossa, sed ab eo, quod sunt ora, intellegatur, ubi Afrae aures de correptione uocalium uel productione non iudicant?" ("Why should a teacher of piety when speaking to the uneducated have regrets about saying ossum ("bone") rather than os in order to prevent that monosyllable (i.e. ŏs "bone") from being interpreted as the word whose plural is ora (i.e. ōs "mouth") rather than the word whose plural is ossa (i.e. ŏs), given that African ears show no judgement in the matter of the shortening of vowels or their lengthening?"))
- Analysis of inscriptions and non-literary documents, including the 3rd century Bu Njem ostraca and Albertini Tablets demonstrate that, despite the presence of other common Vulgar Latin sound changes (such as loss of aspirate h, monophthongization of ae and loss of final m), confusion between ē and ǐ and ō and ŭ is almost nonexistent. Adams finds that inscriptions display a rate of ē/ǐ and ō/ŭ mistakes of only 0.7%, while in the Bu Njem ostraca ē/ǐ and ō/ŭ confusion is totally absent and in the Albertini Tablets there are fewer than two of each error. In contrast, by the 6th–7th century inscriptions from Gaul show that misspellings of ē/ǐ had come to surpass instances of correct spellings, with an error rate of 51% Data by Adamik shows very slightly higher rates of confusion in Africa Proconsularis (5.3%), but still far lower than in Gaul (63.5%) or Hispania (21.3%), and he similarly concludes that "the later Latin of Africa Proconsularis undoubtedly belonged to the Sardinian Romance type of vocalism."
- In Latin loanwords in Berber, Latin short ĭ, ŭ also result in i, u (instead of e, o) as in Sardinian. For example, pullus ("chicken") > afullus, cicer ("chickpea") > i-kīkər, pirus ("pear tree") > ti-firest. However, as Adams points out, assumptions about African Romance vocalism based solely on loanwords should be taken with caution due to the lack of vowels /e, o/ in Berber languages.
- On the contrary, Adamik states that data from inscriptions show that the vowel system of the western province of Mauretania Caesariensis seemed to be developing differently from that of Africa Proconsularis/Sardinia. Due to a higher number of ē/ǐ confusions found than ō/ŭ confusions (at 4.6% vs. 1.3%), it is suggested that the vocalic system of Mauretanian Latin might possibly "have started to develop toward the eastern or Balkan (more exactly Rumanian) type of vocalism": e.g., merging ē with ĭ, ĭ with ī and ŭ with ū, potentially resulting in the six-vowel system /a, ɛ, e, i, o, u/. However, spelling error rates are still too low for a definite conclusion to be made on the classification of the dialect of Mauretania Caesariensis.
- There is additional evidence both from commentary and metrical inscriptions for confusion over syllable length and stress resulting from the collapse of vowel length distinctions. In another passage, Augustine writes that a sound change which was criticized by grammarians was to lengthen formerly short stressed vowels in words like cano ("to sing'), e.g. as [ˈkaːnɔ] instead of [ˈkanoː]. (Note: Latin: "itaque uerbi gratia cum dixeris cano uel in uersu forte posueris, ita ut uel tu pronuntians producas huius uerbi syllabam primam, uel in uersu eo loco ponas, ubi esse productam oportebatl reprehendet grammaticus, custos ille uidelicet historiae, nihil aliud asserens cur corripi oporteat, nisi quod hi qui ante nos fuerunt, et quorum libri exstant tractanturque a grammaticis, ea correpta, non producta usi fuerint" ("And so, for example, when you say cano or happen to use it in verse, such that you either lengthen in pronunciation the first syllable of this word or place it in verse in a position where it should be long, the grammarian, the guardian of tradition, will find fault with you, giving no other reason why it should be shortened except that those who have come before us and whose books survive and are handled by the grammarians have treated it as short not long.")) Consentius makes a similar remark that Africans tended to mispronounce piper ("pepper") with the formerly short stressed syllable lengthened, e.g. [ˈpiːpɛr] instead of [ˈpɪpɛr], (Note: Latin: "ut quidam dicunt piper producta priore syllaba, cum sit brevis, quod vitium Afrorum familiare est." ("just as some people say piper lengthening the first syllable, when it is short, which is a vice of Africans.")) while also shortening formerly long unstressed syllables, as in orator with short o, e.g. [ɔˈraːtɔr] instead of [oːraːtɔr]. (Note: Latin: "ut siquis dicat orator correpta priore syllaba, quod ipsum vitium Afrorum speciale est." ("as if anyone were to say orator with the first syllable shortened, which vice is particular to Africans."))
- Herman also finds evidence metrical inscriptions from the 1st–4th centuries AD for the lengthening of short stressed vowels and shortening of long unstressed vowels, which could point to an earlier loss of contrastive vowel length than in Rome. Adams' analysis of 3rd century poems from Bu Njem written by Italian and African soldiers seem to reflect a dialectal contrast in the vowel systems of the two regions, with the Italian Avidius writer preserving Classical prosody and the African Iasucthan displaying vowel length distinction loss (given that Iasucthan is assumed to have been a native Latin speaker.)
- Modern Berber and Arabic toponyms in the Maghreb inherited from their original Latin names display final /s/, appearing to suggest that African Latin preserved final /s/ as in Western Romance, Sardinian and certain Lucanian dialects. Examples include Cydamus > Ghadames, Gergis > Zarzis, Ad Badias > Bades, (Ta)capis > Gabes, Aelias > 'ilyās, Valleones > b.lyūn.š, Casas > qāsās, cellas > k.llās, *Balneones > b.nūnš, Laribus > lrbs, Turres (multiple locations) > trs, Pratis/Rates > rād.s, Cartennas > Tannas, urbis > al-Urbus, comes > qūmš and sparus > 'šbārs.
- Due to the aforementioned ambiguity of Arabic script in representing the distinction between voiced and voiceless plosives, it remains unclear if African Romance varieties underwent spirantization of voiceless intervocalic /p, t, k/ > [b~β, d~ð, g~ɣ] (which today results as allophonic variation in certain Sardinian, Corsican and Italian dialects, and in Western Romance with full phonological restructuring.) Nevertheless, Fanciullo believes that the Arabic or Berber transcriptions 'dlnt < Atlante(m), rāds < pratis, qamūda < Thagamuta, Zaghouan < Ziqua and taglisya/taġlīs/īǧlīz < ecclesia could represent genuine examples of voicing, while lack of voicing is indicated in the forms fsatu < fossatum and sṭīf < Sitifis.
- The same attested Berber and Arabic transcriptions of the word ecclesia with a voiced element, taglisya/taġlīs/īǧlīz/Tagliss/Tagliz and taɣlis/Taɣlisiya/iglazen/ iglis could indicate a possible voicing of /kl/ > /gl/, as in the Western Romance outcomes, e.g. Spanish iglesia, Portuguese igreja and French église.
- Insertion of prothetic i is attested in African Latin, for example in iscire for scire in the Bu Njem ostraca, in ispes for spes, ispirito for spirito, istipendiorum for stipendiorum, Istefanus for Stephanus or in iscripsi for scripsi in the above cited medieval Islamic-era African Psalter. i-prothesis also appears to be reflected in Arabic transcriptions with initial ' , as in spartum > 'šbrtāl and sparus > 'šbārs.
- Tendency to lose /u/ in the 2nd declension suffix -ius/-ium, e.g. Valerius > Valeris, Ianuarius > Ianuaris, Martius > Martis, etc., also attested in Sardinian and Sicilian (see above.)
- Possible replacement of 3rd declension suffix of origin -ensis with 2nd declension *-ensus, as in Sardinian, e.g. Arnensis > Arnensus.
- Some cases of voicing of initial /k/, e.g. communes > gommunes, Quiza > Maghrebi Arabic Giza/Guzza.
- Certain Arabic transcriptions and modern Maghrebi toponymns could possibly point to a conservation of the consonant clusters /pt, kt/ and /ps/, such as October > al-'ktūbrī, Capsa > Gafsa, Septem (Ceuta) > Sebta/Sabtah, Sullectum > Salakta. This would be another highly conservative outcome compared to Italo-Romance and Sardinian where these sequences undergo assimilation and in Western Romance which has palatalization.

== Vocabulary ==
=== Berber ===
The Polish Arabist Tadeusz Lewicki tried to reconstruct some sections of this language based on 85 lemmas mainly derived from Northwest African toponyms and anthroponyms found in medieval sources. Due to the historical presence in the region of Classical Latin, modern Romance languages, as well as the influence of the Mediterranean Lingua Franca (that has Romance vocabulary) it is difficult to differentiate the precise origin of words in Berber languages and in the varieties of Maghrebi Arabic. The studies are also difficult and often highly conjectural. Due to the large size of the North African territory, it is highly probable that not one but several varieties of African Romance existed, much like the wide variety of Romance languages in Europe. Moreover, other Romance languages spoken in Northwest Africa before the European colonization were the Mediterranean Lingua Franca, a pidgin with Arabic and Romance influences, and Judaeo-Spanish, a dialect of Spanish brought by Sephardi Jews. Scholars are uncertain or disagree on the Latin origin of some of the words presented in the list, which may be attributed alternatively to Berber language internal etymology.

Scholars believe that there is a great number of Berber words, existing in various dialects, which are theorised to derive from late Latin or African Romance, such as the vocabulary in the following list. It might be possible to reconstruct a chronology of which loans entered Berber languages in the Classical Latin period versus in Late Latin/Proto-Romance based on features; for example, certain forms such as afullus (from pullus, "chicken") or asnus (< asinus, "donkey") preserve the Classical Latin nominative ending -us, whereas other words like urṭu (< hortus, "garden") or muṛu (< murus, "wall") have lost final -s (matching parallel developments in Romance, perhaps in deriving from the accusative form after the loss of final -m.) Forms such as tayda (< taeda, "pinewood"), which seem to preserve the Latin diphthong ae, might also be interpreted as archaic highly conservative loans from the Roman Imperial period or earlier.

However, the potential chronological distinction based on word endings is inconsistent; the form qaṭṭus (from cattus, "cat") preserves final -s, but cattus is only attested in Late Latin, when one would expect final -s to have been dropped. Further, the -u endings may instead simply derive from accusative forms which had lost final -m; as a comparison, words drawn from 3rd declension nouns may vary between nominative-based forms like falku < falco ("falcon"), and accusative/oblique-case forms like atmun < temo (Acc: temonem, "pole", cf. Italian timone) or amerkidu ("divine recompense") < merces (Acc: mercedem, "pay/wages", cf. Italiian mercede.)

Nevertheless, when undisputed Latin-derived Berber words are compared with corresponding terms in Italian, Sardinian, Corsican, Sicilian and Maltese, shared phonological outcomes with Sardinian (and to some extent Corsican) seem apparent. For evidence of the merger of Latin short ǐ, ŭ [ɪ, ʊ] with /i, u/ instead of /e, o/, compare how Latin pirus/a ("pear tree/pear") results in Berber ifires and Sardinian pira vs. Italian pero, and Latin pullus ("chicken") becomes Berber afullus and Sardinian puddu vs. Italian pollo. For evidence of a lack of palatalization of velar stops, notice how Latin merces ("pay/wages") results in Berber amerkidu and Sardinian merchede vs. Italian mercede, Latin cicer ("chickpea") becomes Berber ikiker and Sardinian chìghere vs. Italian cece and Latin celsa becomes Berber tkilsit and Sardinian chersa vs. Italian gelso and Latin filix (genitive filicis, "fern") becomes Berber filku and Sardinian filighe vs. Italian felce. For evidence to the contrary in favor of palatalization of velar stops, see centenum > išenti, angelus > anǧelus (dialectally, with other varieties displaying non-palatalized forms), etc. and agaricellus > argusal/arsel.

English	Berber	Latin	Sardinian	Italian	Corsican	Sicilian	Maltese
sin / sickness / little child (lit., "without sin")	abekkaḍu / abăkkaḍ / war-abekkadu / war-ibekkaden	peccatum ("sin"; "error"; "fault")	pecadu / pecau ("sin")	peccato ("sin")	pecatu ("sin")	piccatu ("sin")	
wether (castrated ram)	aberkus	vervex / berbex > *berbecus(?)	berbeghe / berveghe / barveghe / barbeghe / verveche / berbeche / erveghe / ilveghe/ barbei / brabei / brebei / erbei / arbei / brobei / ebrei	berbice			
celery	abiw	apium ("celery"; "parsley")	àpiu / àppiu	appio		accia	
road / path	abrid / tabrida	veredus ("fast or light breed of horse")					
oven	afarnu / affran / afferan / ufernu / ferran / afurnu / tafurnut	furnus	furru / forru	forno	fornu / forru / furru	furnu	forn
chicken / chick	afullus / afellus / fiǧǧus / fullis	pullus	puddu	pollo	pullastru	puḍḍu / pollu	fellus
fresh curd / to curdle / curdled milk	aguglu / kkal / ikkil	coagulari / coagulum ("to curdle"; "curd"; "bind/bonding agent"; "rennet"; "rennet")	callu / cazu / cracu / cragu / giagu ("rennet")	caglio ("rennet")	caghju ("rennet")	quagghiu / quagliu ("rennet")	
agaric	agursal / arsel	agaric > *agaricellum		agarico			
boat	aɣeṛṛabu	carabus					
oak	akarruš / akerruš	cerrus / quercus	chercu	quercia	quercia	querchia	
elevated part of the bedroom	alektu / řeštu	lectus ("bed")	letu ("bed")	letto ("bed")	lettu ("bed")	lettu ("bed")	
oleander	alili / ilili / talilit	lilium (lily)	lizu / lilliu / lillu / lixu / lìgiu / gixu / gìgliu / gìsgiu ("lily")	giglio ("lily")	gigliu ("lily")	gigghiu ("lily")	ġilju ("lily")
alms / religious compensation	amerkidu / amarkidu / emarked / bu-imercidan	merces ("pay"; "wages"; "reward"; "punishment"; "rent"; "bribe")	merchede ("pay"; "recompense")	mercede ("recompense"; "merit"; "pity"; "mercy")		mercedi / mircedi ("remuneration"; "payment"; "wage"; "salary"), merci (merchandise"; "goods")	
olive marc	amuṛeǧ	amurca		morchia		mùrija / muria	
angel / spiritual entity / child / type of illness	anǧelus / anǧalus / anglus / ănǧălos / ăngălos / anaǧlusan / wanaǧlusan / anglusen	angelus	àgnelu / ànzelu / ànghelu / àngelu	angelo	anghjulu	àncilu / ànciulu	anġlu
to light up / illuminate / light / lamp	amnar	limino, liminare / lumino, luminare		luminare			
(large) sack / double bag/donkey's saddle / tapestry	asaku / saku / sakku / saču	saccus	sacu	sacco	saccu	saccu	saqqu
donkey / ass	asnus	asinus	àinu	asino	asinu	àsinu	
belonging to or attached to a yoke	ašbiyo / ašbuyo	subiugius	sisùja / susùja	soggiogo			
helm	aṭmun / aṭmuni	temo ("pole"; "tongue of carriage"; "beam")	timona / timone / timoni	timone	timone	timuni	tmun
August	awussu	augustus	agustu / austu	agosto	aostu / agostu	Austu	Awwissu / Awissu
blite	blitu	blitum		bieta ("beet": from beta, "beet" + blitum, "blite")		jiti / ajiti / agghiti / gidi / nciti / aiti ("beet": from beta, "beet" + blitum, "blite")	
young boy	bušil	pusillus ("small")	pusiddu ("small boy")	pusillo ("small")			
thrush (bird, in family turdidae	ḍerḍus / ḍorḍus	turdus		tordo	tôdula	turdu	
large wooden bowl	dusku	discus	discu	disco	discu		
(drawing) rule / vertical beam of weaving loom	errigla	regula ("rule / bar / ruler")	regra / arregra / rega / rega / regia / reja	reglio (rare) / regola (later borrowing)	rica / riga	règula/ rèjula (later borrowing)	regola (later borrowing)
bearded vulture / bird of prey	falku / afalku / afelkun / fařšu	falco ("falcon")		falco / falcone ("falcon")	falcu ("falcon")	farcu / farcuni / falcuni ("falcon")	falkun ("falcon")
locality in Tripolitania	Fassaṭo	fossatum(?) ("ditch", e.g. as fortification)		fossato ("ditch")		fussatu ("ditch")	foss ("ditch")
pennyroyal	fleyyu / fliyu / fleggu	pulegium / puleium / puledium / pulleium / pulledium		poleggio / puleggio			
February	furar	februārius	freàrgiu / frearzu / fiàrzu	febbraio	ferraghju / farraghju / frivaghju	Frivaru	Frar
hen-house	gennayru	gallinarium		gallinaio		gaḍḍinaru / jaḍḍinaru	
castle / village	ɣasru	castrum (diminutive: castellum)	casteddu	castello	castellu	casteḍḍu	qasar / kastell
bean	ibaw / awaw	faba	faa / faba / fae / fava	fava		fava / fafa	
evil spirit	idaymunen	daemon / daemonium ("lar, household god"; "demon, evil spirit")		demone / demonio	dimoniu	dimoniu	
fern	ifilku	filix	filiche / filighe / filixi / fibixi / fixibi	felce	filetta	fìlici	felċi
thread	ifilu	filum(?) ("thread; string; filament; fiber")	filu	filo	filu	filu	
vulture	i-gider	vultur		avvoltoio / avvoltore / voltore / vultore / vulture		vuturu / avuturu	avultun
pear / pear tree	ifires / tfirast / tafirast	pirus (feminine: pira, "pear fruit")	pira ("pear fruit")	pero	pera ("pear fruit")	piru	
cultivated field	iger / ižer	ager	agru	agro	acru	agru	
laborer (to plough)	ikerrez	carrus ("wagon; cart; wagonload", from Gaulish)	carru	carro		carru	
chickpea	ikiker	cicer	chìghere / cìxiri	cece	cecciu	ciciri	ċiċri
horehound	immerwi	marrubium	marrubiu	marrubio		marrubbiju	marrubja
sea squill / sea onion (Drimia maritima)	isfil	squilla / scilla	aspidda	squilla			
rye	išenti / tāšentit	centenum ("rye; something gathered hundred each")					
durmast	iskir	aesculus		eschio / ischio			
fig (in the stage of pollination) / artichoke	karḍus (first definition) / ɣerdus / ɣerda (second definition)	carduus ("thistle"; "artichoke")		cardo ("thistle")	cardu ("thistle")	cardu ("thistle")	
bug / bedbug	kumsis	cimex	chímighe	cimice	cimicia	cìmicia	
wall	muṛu / maṛu	murus	muru	muro	muru	muru	
cat	qaṭṭus / takaṭṭust / yaṭṭus / ayaḍus / qeṭṭus	cattus	gatu / atu / batu / catu	gatto	ghjattu / gattu / ghiattu	jattu	qattus
Rif (locality in Morocco)	Rif	ripa(?) ("shore"; "bank")		ripa ("shore"; "bank")			
feast / religious celebration / springtime	tafaska / tafaske / tabaski / tfeskih	pascha ("Easter"; "Passover")	Pasca ("Easter")	Pasqua ("Easter")	Pasqua ("Easter")	Pasqua ("Easter")	
cauldron / iron bowl / cooking jug	tafḍna / tafeḍna / tafaḍna	patina ("shallow pan or dish for cooking"; type of cake; "crib")		patina ("patina"; "coat"; "film"; "glaze"; "size")			
carrot	tafesnaxt	pastinaca ("parsnip"; "stingray")	pastinaca / pistinaga / frustinaca ("parsnip"; "carrot")	pastinaca ("parsnip")	pastinaccia / pastricciola ("parsnip")	bastunaca / vastunaca ("parsnip")	
bud or eye of a plant / gem / jewel	tagemmut	gemma		gemma			
crow	tagerfa	corvus	colbu / crobu / colvu / corbu / corvu	corvo	corbu	corvu / corbu	
throat	tageržumt	gurga(?)(Late Latin, from gurges, "whirlpool")		gorgia (archaic)		gargiularu	gerżuma
thing	taɣawsa / tɣawsa / taghaussa / tghussa	causa ("case"; "reason/cause"; "motive"; "condition/state"; "justification")	cosa (inherited from Italian; Old Sardinian, casa)	cosa	còsa	cùosa	
various toponyms	Taɣlis / Taɣlisiya / iglazen / iglis / Tarlist	ecclesia(?) ("church")	chegia / cheja / creia / crèsia ("church")	chiesa ("church")	chiesa / ghiesgia / jesgia ("church")	chìesa / chisa / chesa / clesia / crèsia / crièsia ("church")	
wax	takir	cera	chera / cera	cera	cera	cira	
quince	taktuniyt / taktunya	(malum) cydonium / cotonium / cotoneum (plural cydonium / cotonia)	chidonza / chintonza / chitonza	cotogno ("quince tree") / cotogna ("quince fruit")	melacutona / melacutugnu	cutugnu / cutugna	
seaweed	talga	alga	alga	alga		àlica	alka
file	talima / tilima / tlima	lima	lima	lima		lima	
irrigation channel	targa	*riga(?) < irrigo("to water/irrigate/flood")		irrigare ("to irrigate")		irrigà ("irrigate")	
weapon	tarma	arma	àrma	arma	arma	arma	arma
madder (red-dye)	tarubi / tarubya / tarrubya / awrubya / tṛubya	rubia		robbia			
ladder	taskala	scala ("ladder"; "stairs")	iscala / issala / scaba	scala	scala	scala	
pod (of pea or bean) / carob	tasligwa / tasliɣwa / tisliɣwa / tasliwɣa	siliqua	silimba / silibba / tilimba / tilidda	serqua			
pair / pair of drought animals, oxen	tawgtt / tayuga / tayugʷa / tayuggʷa / tyuya / tiyuyya / tiyuga / tǧuǧa / tguget / tiugga	iugum ("pair of drought animals"; "yoke"; "couple")	jugu / giugu / giuu ("yoke")	giogo ("yoke")	jugu ("yoke")	giugu ("yoke")	
pine	tayda	taeda ("pinewood")		teda		deda	
shirt	tekamest	camisia	camigia / camisa	camicia	camisgia / camigia / camicia	cammisa	qmis
elbow	tiɣammar / taɣomert / tiɣumert	camur < camur ("bent"; "curved"; "hooked")	cambra ("clamp"; "cramp")				
lentil	tilintit / tiniltit	lens	lènte / lentìza	lente / lenticchia	lintichja	lenti / linticchia	
shoemaker's awl	tissubla / tisubla / tsubla / tasubla / tasobla / tasugla / subla	subula		subbia ("chisel")			
catapult	tfurka / afurk / tfurket	furca ("fork"; "pitchfork"; "pole"; "stake")	frúca / furca ("fork"; "pitchfork")	forca ("fork"; "pitchfork")		furca ("fork"; "pitchfork")	
mulberry tree	tkilsit / tkilsa	(morus) celsa	chersa / chessa	gelso / moro		ceusu	
piece of paper	tkirḍa / tkurḍa / takerḍa / takarḍe, tyerṭa	carta / charta ("paper"; "papyrus")	carta / calta	carta	carta	carta	karta
wooden board for making doors / irrigable field (second two forms listed)	toḍabla / taġult / tiġula	tabula ("board"; "tablet")	taula ("piece of wood")	tavola ("table"; "slate")	tavula ("table")	tàvula ("table")	
theater	ṭyaṭir	theatrum	teatru	teatro	teatru	tiatru	teatru
wooden board for making doors / irrigable field (second two forms listed)	ulmu	ulmus	úlimu / úlumu / urmu	olmo	olmu	urmu	
stove / cooker	θafkunt	*focone(?) < focus ("fire"; "fireplace"; "hearth"; "coalpan")	fogu / focu ("fire")	fuoco ("fire")	focu ("fire")	focu ("fire")	
rope	θasuχa	soca	soga	soga			
field / garden	urṭu / urti	hortus ("garden")	oltu / ortu / otu ("vegetable garden")	orto ("vegetable garden")	ortu ("garden")	ortu ("vegetable garden")	
white mustard (Sinapis arvensis)	(w)ašnaf / hacenafiṭ / hacenafṭ / wayfes / waifs	senapi(s) / sinapi(s) / senape / sinape(?)		senape		sinapi	

For the other month names, see Berber calendar.

== See also ==
- Africitas, a purported "dialect" of African Latin.
- Southern Romance, a proposed hypothetical Romance classification, including Sardinian and African Romance
- Lausberg area, a region of southern Italy covering Basilicata where the local Neapolitan dialects display variation between Sardinian, Sicilian and Romanian-like vowel systems
- Sardinian language, as stated above, theorized to be the closest surviving language to African Romance.
- British Latin, another extinct dialect of Latin.
- Moselle Romance, another extinct dialect of Latin.
- Pannonian Romance, another extinct dialect of Latin.
