= Louis Leschi =

French historian, epigrapher and archaeologist (1893-1954)

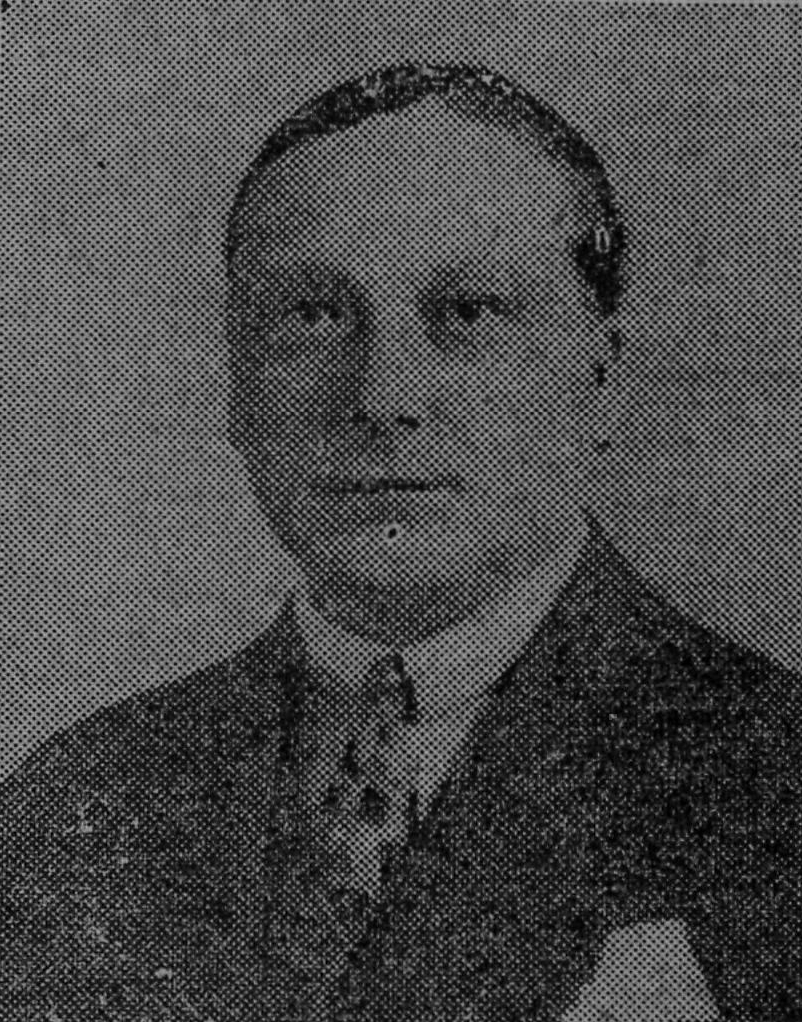
- Born: 2 December 1893; Bastia (Corsica)
- Died: 7 January 1954 (aged 60); Algiers
- Occupations: Historian; Epigrapher; Archaeologist

Louis Leschi (2 December 1893 – 7 January 1954) was a French historian, epigrapher and archaeologist, a specialist of ancient North Africa.

== Biography ==
The son of academics, Louis Leschi followed himself an exemplary curriculum whose beginnings were interrupted by World War I. After his admission to the École Normale Superieure in 1919, he obtained his agrégation of history in 1922. He then was a member of the École française de Rome from 1922 to 1924. During this period of training, he followed the courses of René Cagnat and Jérôme Carcopino. It was during his stay in the French school in Rome that he was sent to Algeria to Stéphane Gsell and found his vocation of archaeologist specializing in ancient Algeria. He was appointed a professor in high school in Algiers until 1932. He was then also associated to the research conducted by Eugène Albertini and gave classes in 1926 at the Faculty.

When Albertini was appointed to the Collège de France in 1932, Leschi succeeded him at the direction of the Department of Antiquities of North Africa. Leschi also succeeded him and Stéphane Gsell, as a teacher at the Faculty of Algiers, but only as detached high school teacher, his lack of doctoral thesis preventing him to get the chair of the Faculty. Dividing his time between teaching and intense activity in the context of his archaeological responsibilities, Leschi ultimately never supported his thesis. That did not prevent him from becoming a renowned scholar and exert a profound influence on the development of archeology in Algeria. In 1932, he was a member of the board of the Algerian Historical Society of which he became vice president in 1944. In 1942, he was elected a corresponding member of the Academy of Inscriptions and Belles Lettres. He died of illness in 1954 without being able to publish an expected account on ancient Numidia.

== Work ==
From 1923, Louis Leschi left many scientific articles on archeology and epigraphy, some of which were taken up in a posthumous volume published in 1957. In addition to his articles in Comptes rendus des scéances de l'Académie des Inscriptions et Belles-Lettres (CRAI) and Mélanges de l'École française de Rome (MEFR), he published reports on Algerian archeology in the Revue africaine from 1933 to 1953. He also wrote large public works and archaeological guides, including one devoted to the site of Cuicul. He took part to the edition of the Albertini tablets. His action as director of the antiquities service was marked by several important initiatives. With Colonel Baradez, he was the organizer and initiator of the practice of aerial archaeology in North Africa. In 1949 he supported the creation of a prehistoric anthropology laboratory at the Bardo National Museum of Prehistory and Ethnography. Among many operations as part of his service, he particularly supervised the excavation of Hippo Regius led by M.E. Marec, followed those of Tebessa and Djemila, accompanied closely those of fort Timgad led by Godet. Leschi planned to publish a volume on the Byzantine fort. He led the excavations in Lambaesis where he discovered the first Roman military camp. He was one of the creators of the journal Libyca and contributed to the formation of many archaeologists including Pierre Salama.

== Publications ==
=== Books ===
- 1938: Djemila Cuicul de Numidie : toute une cité de l'Afrique romaine, Algiers
- 1943: Le Centenarium d'Aqua Viva près de M'doukal (Commune mixte de Barika), Algiers, 22 p.
- 1950: Tipasa de Maurétanie, Algiers, 53 p.
- 1952: Tablettes Albertini. Actes privés de l'époque vandale (fin du Ve), with C. Courtois, L. Leschi, C. Perrat, C. Saumagne, Paris
- 1952: Algérie antique, with photographs by Marcel Bovis, 199 p.
- 1953: Djemila, antique Cuicul, Algiers, 64 p.
- 1957: Études d'épigraphie, d'archéologie et d'histoire africaine, Paris.

=== Articles (selection) ===
- 1923: Correction à "Ephemeris Epigraphica", VIII, N°632, (MEFR), 40–1, (pp. 207–217)
- 1932: Le cimetière de Sainte-Salsa, à Tipasa de Maurétanie with Eugène Albertini, (CRAI), 76–1, (pp. 77–78)
- 1934: Reliquaires chrétiens du Vie siècle en Numidie, (CRAI), 78–3, (pp. 236–245)
- 1935: Domitia Lucilla, mère de Marc-Aurèle, (MEFR), 52–1, (pp. 81–94)
- 1937: Recherches aériennes sur le "limes" romain de Numidie, (CRAI), 81-3, (pp. 256-262)
- 1937: Une mosaïque achiléenne de Tipasa de Mauritanie, (MEFR), 54-1, (pp. 25-41)
- 1941: Centenarium quod « Aqua Viva » appellatur…, (CRAI), 85-2, (pp. 163-176)
- 1944: Inscription d'Arris (Aurès) en l'honneur de Masties with Jérôme Carcopino, (CRAI), 88-1, (pp. 13-14)
- 1945: La carrière de Q. Marcius Turbo, préfet du prétoire d'Hadrien, (CRAI), 89-1, (pp. 144-162)
- 1947: Découverte récente à Timgad : Aqua septimia felix, (CRAI), 91-1, (pp. 87-99)
- 1947: Nouvelles recherches aériennes sur le "limes" d'Afrique, (CRAI), 91–3, (pp. 512–517)
- 1947: L'album municipal de Timgad et l'"ordo salutationis" du consulaire Ulpius Mariscianus, (CRAI), 91–3, (pp. 563–570) Read online.
- 1949: Découvertes épigraphiques dans le camp de Gemellae (El-Kasbat, Algérie), (CRAI), 93–3, (pp. 220–226)

== Bibliography ==
- 1954: Albert Grenier, Éloge funèbre de M. Louis Leschi, correspondant français de l'Académie, (CRAI), 98–1, (pp. 14–18) Read online.
- 1954: Marcel Durry, « Nécrologie : Louis Leschi », MEFR, 66, (pp. 323–325)
- 1954: Jean Despois, « Louis Leschi 1893-1954 », Revue Africaine, (pp. 27–40)
- 1999: Pierre Salama, « Tableaux de maîtres », in Claude Lepelley and Xavier Dupuy, Frontières et limites géographiques de l'Afrique du Nord antique, Hommage à Pierre Salama, Publications de la Sorbonne, Paris, (pp. 295–297)
- 2004: Nabila Oulebsir, Les usages du patrimoine : monuments, musées et politique coloniale en Algérie (1830–1930), Maison des sciences de l'homme, Paris, (pp. 336–337)
