= Southern Romance languages =

Group of languages

Southern Romance
- Geographic distribution: Corsica, Sardinia, Roman Africa
- Ethnicity: Sardinians
- Linguistic classification: Indo-European: Italic; Latino-Faliscan; Latin; Romance; Southern Romance
- Subdivisions: Sardinian; Old Corsican †; African †

Language codes
- Glottolog: sard1257 sout3158
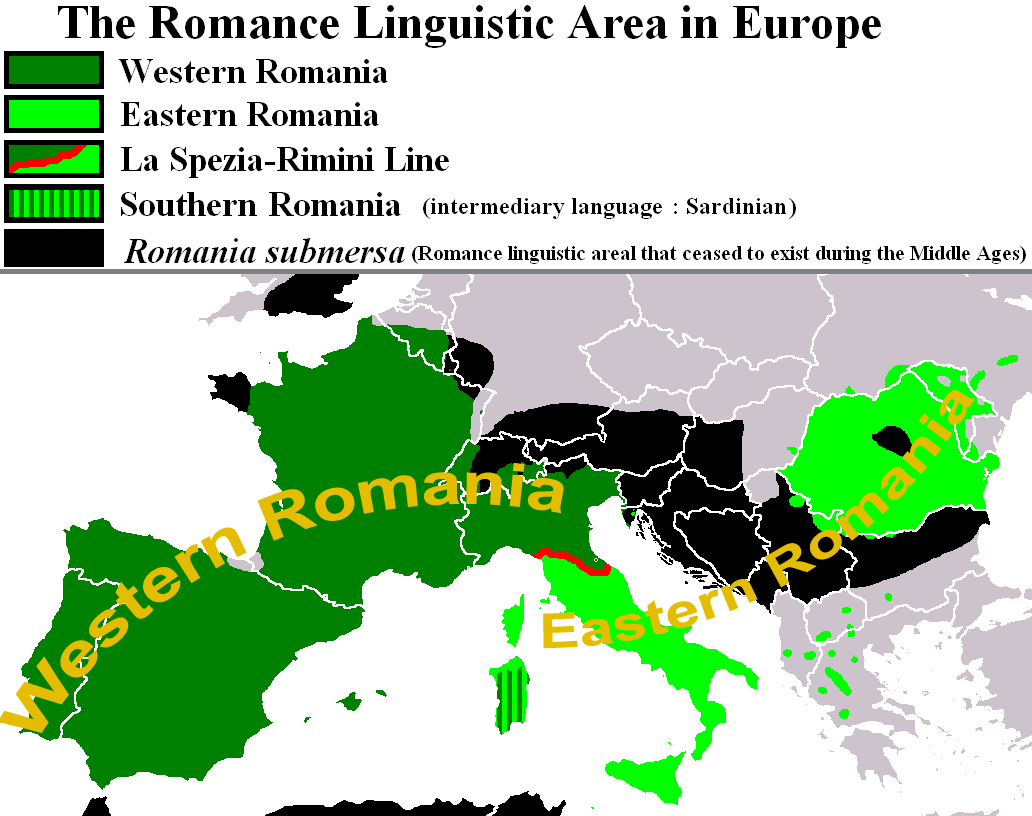
- Sardinia as part of the Southern Romance group in Europe

The Southern Romance languages are a primary branch of the Romance languages.

According to the classification of linguists such as Leonard (1980) and Agard (1984), the Southern Romance family is composed of Sardinian, Corsican, and the southern Lucanian dialects.

This theory is far from universally supported. In fact, the majority of linguists classify Corsican, including Gallurese and Sassarese as its dialects, as part of Italo-Dalmatian and closely related to Tuscan or the centro-southern Italian dialects, because of the island's considerable degree of tuscanization during the Middle Ages, leaving Sardinian as the only remaining representative of the branch once the African Romance dialects had gone extinct.

== Classification ==
Ethnologue and Glottolog, which support the Southern Romance theory, propose the following classification (with Glottolog considering South Lucanian and Sardo-Corsican to be branches of Southern Romance and Ethnologue considering Sardo-Corsican to be synonymous with Southern Romance), which is not endorsed by other linguists in light of the structural differences between these languages. Corsican, for example, is otherwise classified as an Italo-Dalmatian language, and Gallurese, like Sassarese, as a (southern) Corsican dialect (with influences from Logudorese Sardinian) or a transitional variety between Corsican and Sardinian. However, the southern dialects of Corsican as well as Gallurese and Sassarese display Sardinian-like vocalism (see Romance languages § Dialects of southern Italy, Sardinia and Corsica).

Other classifications include in the family the extinct group of African Romance, which is known to have been used by populations of North Africa pertaining to the Roman sphere of influence during at least the first centuries after the dissolution of official institutions of the Roman Empire, and developed under the rule of the Byzantine Empire in the area.

== Gallery ==
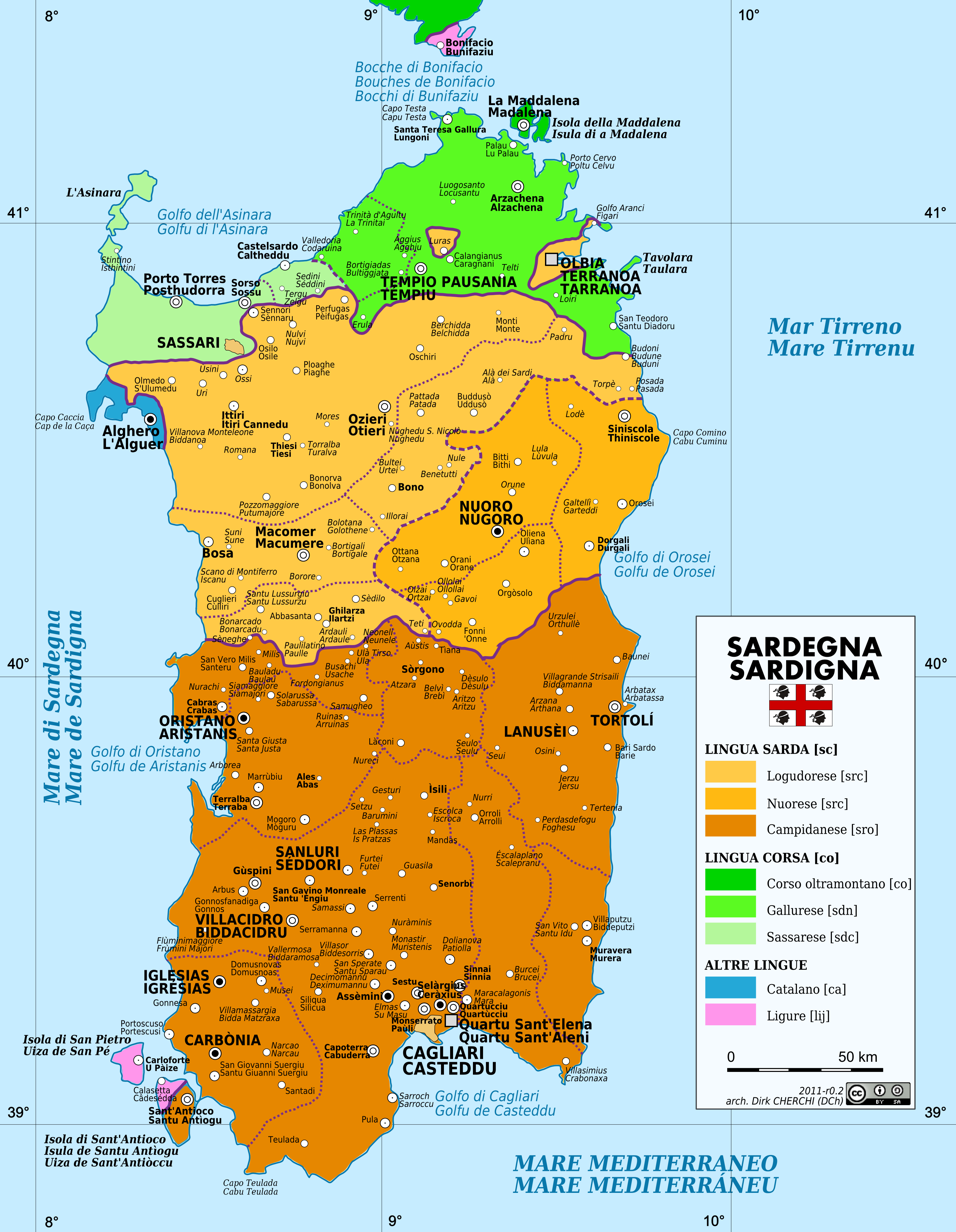
Linguistic map of Sardinia

Linguistic map of Corsica and northern Sardinia

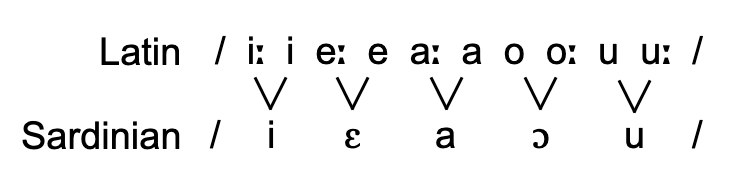
Vowel changes from Latin to Sardinian
