= Consentia gens =

Plebeian family at ancient Rome

The gens Consentia was a plebeian family at ancient Rome, which first appears in history toward the end of the fourth century AD. Others are known from inscriptions.

== Members ==
- Consentius, named along with persons called Aurelianus and Rufianus in an inscription from Savaria in Pannonia Superior, dating between the first and third centuries.
- Gaius Consentius Exoratus, named in an inscription from Brixia in Venetia and Histria, dedicated to Minerva.
- Consentius, a poet praised by Sidonius Apollinaris. He married a daughter of the consul Jovianus. He, his son, or his grandson may be the same as the grammarian Publius Consentius.
- Consentius, son of the poet Consentius, rose to high honour under Valentinian III, by whom he was named Comes Palatii and dispatched upon an important mission to Theodosius II. He may be the same as the grammarian Publius Consentius.
- Consentius, grandson of the poet, and likewise praised by Sidonius Apollinaris, devoted himself to literary leisure and the enjoyments of a rural life.
- Publius Consentius, a Latin grammarian, and author of two treatises that are still extant. He is generally thought to be identical with the poet Consentius, his son, or his grandson, but it is not certain which.

== See also ==
- List of Roman gentes

== Bibliography ==
- Gaius Sollius Modestus Apollinaris Sidonius, Epistulae.
- Johann Albert Fabricius, Bibliotheca Latina, sive Notitia Auctorum Veterum Latinorum (The Latin Library, or Knowledge of Ancient Latin Authors), Weidmanns Erben und Reich, Leipzig (1773–1774).
- Dictionary of Greek and Roman Biography and Mythology, William Smith, ed., Little, Brown and Company, Boston (1849).
- Theodor Mommsen et alii, Corpus Inscriptionum Latinarum (The Body of Latin Inscriptions, abbreviated CIL), Berlin-Brandenburgische Akademie der Wissenschaften (1853–present).
