= Africitas =

Putative African dialect of Latin

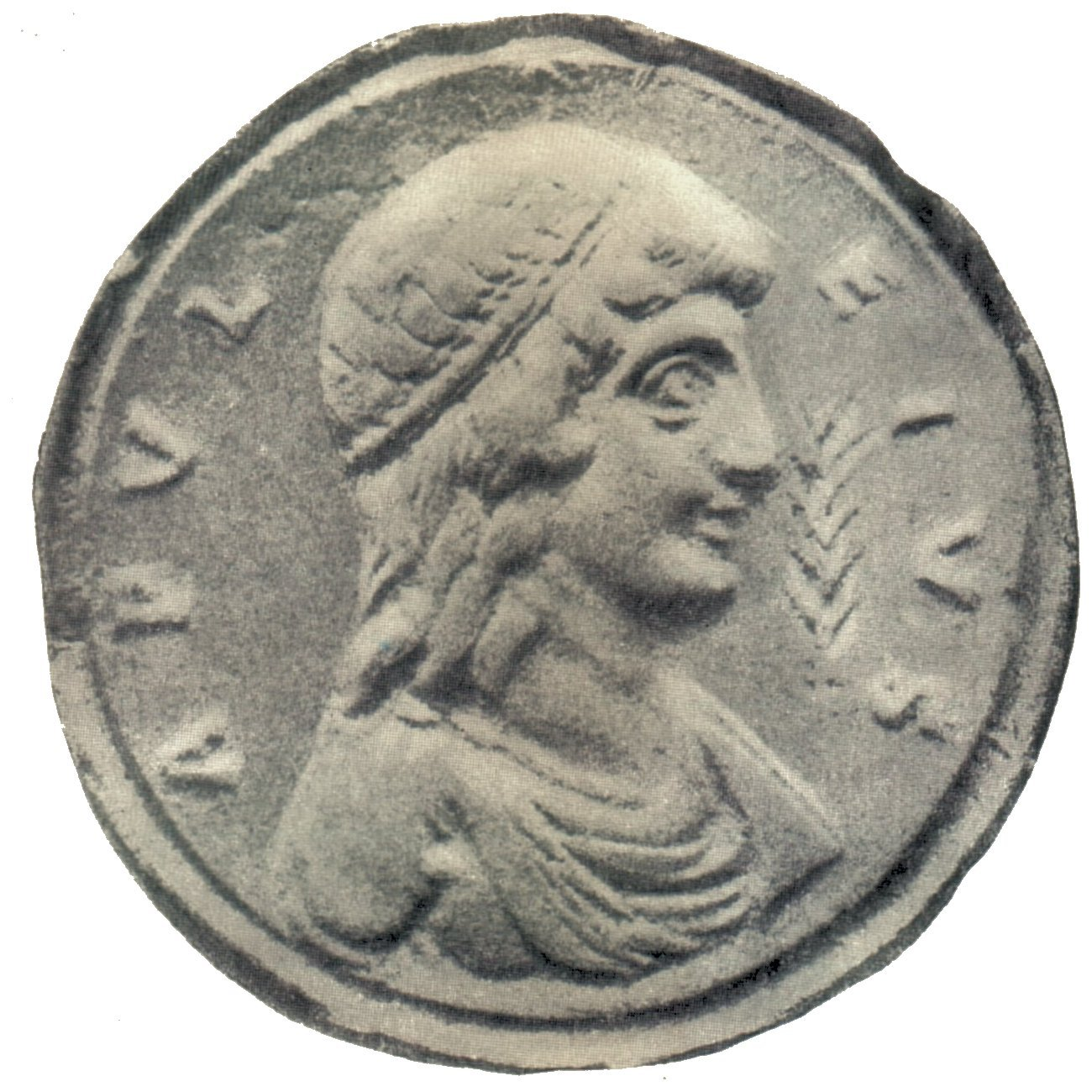
An imagined portrait of the author Apuleius from the 4th century. Apuleius is, among others, an author frequently discussed in works about Africitas.

Africitas is a putative African dialect of Latin. The term was first used by Erasmus as a pejorative to characterize certain elements of African Latin works. In the 20th century, the concept of Africitas was discussed by scholars, who often analyzed African authors like Saint Augustine, a Church Father, and the grammarian Marcus Cornelius Fronto in regard to this hypothetical dialect. After 1945, this scholarly conversation died off for many years. However, the discussion was revived in the early 21st century with the publication of the book, Apuleius and Africa (2014), which examined the concept of Africitas anew, this time largely in regard to the prose writer Apuleius.

Those who argue in favor of an Africitas claim that the dialect is demarcated by "peculiarities of vocabulary, syntax, sentence-structure, and style". G. N. Olcott further argues that African Latin "was freest in word formation." After a lengthy consideration of the topic, J. N. Adams argues that "there was [a type of language that we call Africitas, but] given the remoteness of parts of Africa, there was probably a plurality of varieties of Latin rather than a single 'African Latin'." Catherine Conybeare of Bryn Mawr argues that singling out Africitas can be viewed as racist. In regards to this, Vincent Hunink of Radboud University Nijmegen notes that, while it is undeniable that regional variants of spoken Latin existed, "no similar scholarly debate discussion" about the vocabulary, syntax, sentence-structure, and style of "'Germanitas' or 'Brittanitas' has ever come up", suggesting that a fixation on Africitas is problematic.

== See also ==
- African Romance languages derived from local North African Latin.
