= Eugène Albertini =

French teacher in Latin literature and historian (1880-1941)

- Born: 2 October 1880; Compiègne, Oise Department, France
- Died: 15 February 1941 (aged 60); Paris, France
- Occupations: Teacher; Historian; Epigrapher

Eugène Albertini (2 October 1880 – 15 February 1941) was a 20th-century French teacher in Latin literature, a historian of ancient Rome, especially for North Africa and an epigrapher of Latin texts. He was a member of the Académie des inscriptions et belles-lettres (1938).

== Biography ==
Eugène Albertini was a student at the Lycée Henri-IV, where he won the Latin essay prize at the concours général, a former student of École Normale Supérieure (1900–1903), and a former member of the École française de Rome (1903–1906).

He started working as a teacher at the Lycée de Nantes (1906–1907) and the Lycée de Vesoul (1907–1909), then turned to research by integrating the Institute of Hispanic Studies (1909–1912). He was mobilized from 1914 to 1919, then after going to the chair of Latin literature of the University of Freiburg in Switzerland, he succeeded in 1920 to Jérôme Carcopino at the Faculty of Letters of Algiers as holder of the Chair of Antiquities of Africa that Stéphane Gsell had illustrated. From 1923 to 1932, he was Director of Antiquities of Algeria, during which period he contributed to the drafting of the Corpus des Inscriptions latines d'Algérie.

From 1932 to 1935, he held the chair of Roman civilization at the Collège de France then was responsible in 1936 and 1937 of the course of Roman history at the new Federal University of Rio de Janeiro.

He is the author of numerous articles on the antiquities of Algeria published in the Bulletin archéologique du Comité des travaux historiques, the Comptes rendus de l'Académie des inscriptions et belles-lettres, the Journal des savants, among others in 1928 an article on acts of sale of the 5th century of the Vandals period (called since the Albertini tablettes) discovered in the Tébessa region, the Revue africaine, the Recueil de la Société archéologique de Constantine, the Bulletin de la Société de géographie d'Oran, etc.

== Main publications ==
- 1923: La Composition dans les ouvrages philosophiques de Sénèque (thesis, Sorbonne)
- 1923: Les Divisions administratives de l'Espagne romaine (secondary thesis, Sorbonne)
- 1929: L'Empire romain (reprinted in 1938 and 1940)
- 1930: Les ruines romaines d'Algérie, in L'Illustration, 24 May
- 1931: L'Algérie antique (in Histoire et historiens de l'Algérie)
- 1937: L'Afrique romaine
- 1937: L'Afrique du Nord française dans l'histoire. With Georges Marçais and Georges Yver.

== Bibliography ==
- Aubert, Marcel (1941). "Éloge funèbre de M. Eugène Albertini, membre de l'Académie". Comptes Rendus des Séances de l'Académie des Inscriptions et Belles-Lettres. 85 (2). Comptes rendus des séances de l'Académie des Inscriptions et Belles-Lettres, 85e année: 65–70..
