= Roman Africans =

Ethnic group

Afri (Latin)
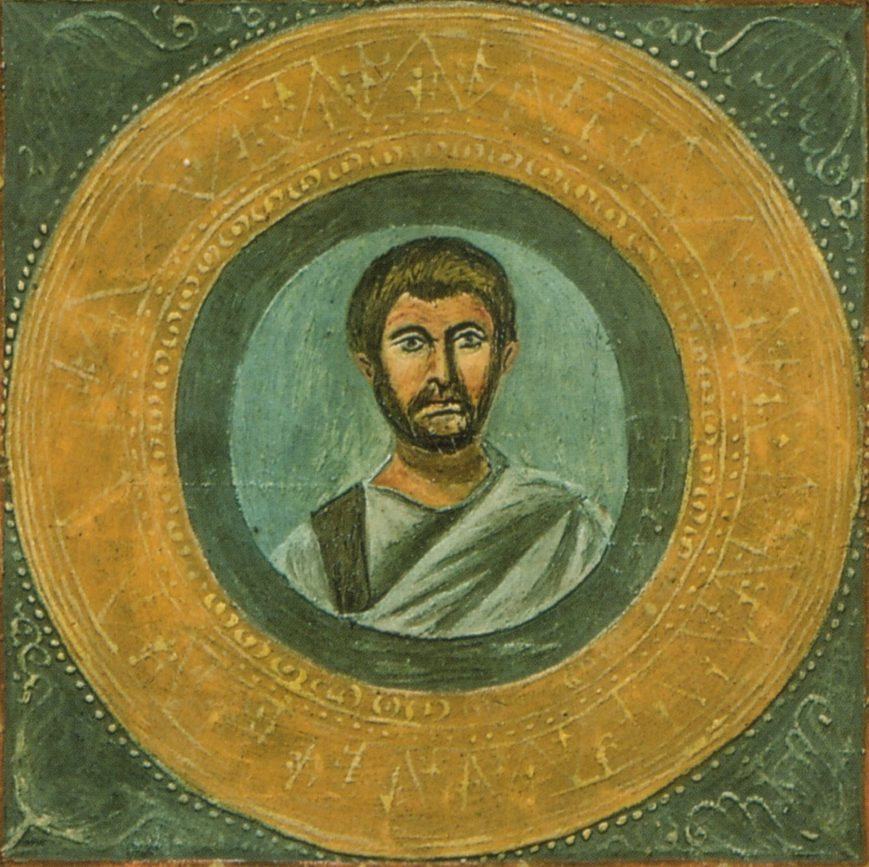
- Portrait of the Roman African poet Terentius

Regions with significant populations
- Roman Africa

Languages
- African Latin · Berber · Punic

Religion
- Roman religion · Roman Catholicism · Islam

Related ethnic groups
- African Greeks · Berbers · Punics · Maghrebis

The Roman Africans or African Romans (Latin: Afri) were the ancient populations of Roman Africa that had a Romanized culture, some of whom spoke their own variety of Latin as a result. They existed from the Roman conquest until their language gradually faded out after the Arab conquest of North Africa from West Asia in the Early Middle Ages (approximately the 8th century AD).

Roman Africans lived in all the coastal cities of contemporary Tunisia, Western Libya, Eastern Algeria, as well as West Algeria and Northern Morocco, though in a more limited fashion, mainly concentrated in the coastal areas and large towns. The area between East Algeria and Western Libya became known under Arab rule as Ifriqiya, an Arabized version of the name of the Roman province of Africa.

Many Roman Africans were generally local Berbers or Punics, but also the descendants of the populations that came directly from Rome and Roman Italy itself or the diverse regions of the Empire as legionaries and senators.

== Characteristics and history ==
=== In the Roman Empire ===
The Roman-Africans first adopted the Roman pantheon under the rule of the Roman Republic, but then were one of the first provinces to convert to Christianity. Among their best-known figures were Saint Felicita, Saint Perpetua, Saint Cyprian and Saint Augustine. Unlike the so-called Mauri that mostly inhabited the westernmost part of Northwest Africa and were barely Romanized, Roman Africans (like Septimus Severus or saint Aurelius Augustinus) had Latin names in addition to speaking Latin.

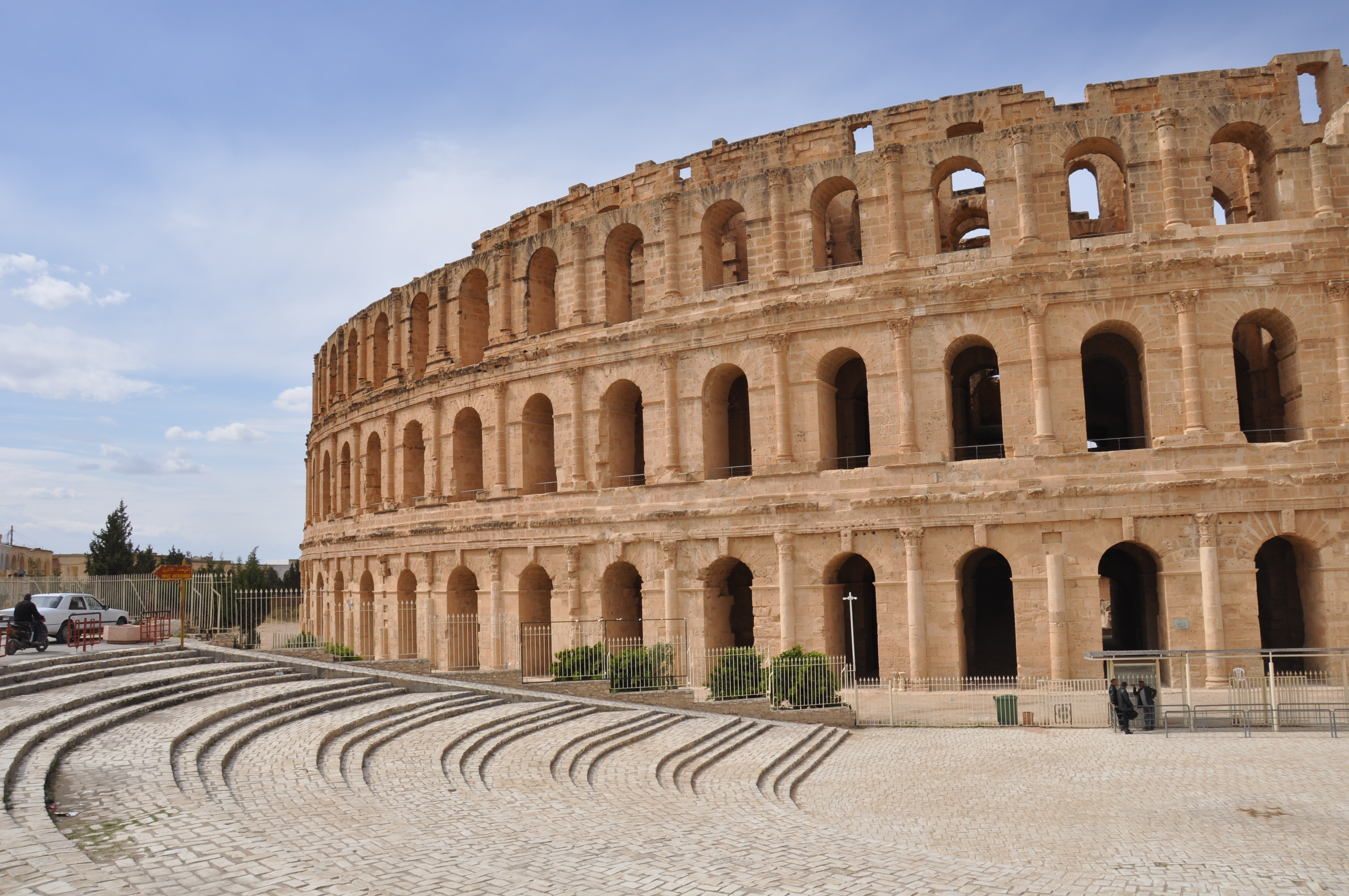
The amphitheatre of Thysdrus (modern El Djem, Tunisia).

The African province was among the wealthiest regions in the Empire (rivaled only by Egypt, Syria and Italy itself) and as a consequence people from all over the Empire migrated into the province. Large numbers of Roman Army veterans settled in Northwest Africa on farming plots promised for their military service.

Even so, the Roman military presence of Northwest Africa was relatively small because of the safety of the province; the Romans did not require a large military presence in North Africa since it was not a target for external attacks or rebellions. When the need arose, the relative proximity of the region to Italia made it possible to dispatch armies from Italia to North Africa very easily. By the second century AD, the Fossa Regia province of North Africa had a population three-fourths Italic, was fully Latinized and embraced the Hellenic Religion. The North African garrison consisted of about 28,000 troops and auxiliaries in Numidia. Starting in the 2nd century AD, these garrisons were composed mostly of local inhabitants. A sizable Latin speaking population developed from a multinational background, sharing the northwest African region with those speaking Punic and Berber languages. Imperial security forces began to be drawn from the local population, including the Berbers.

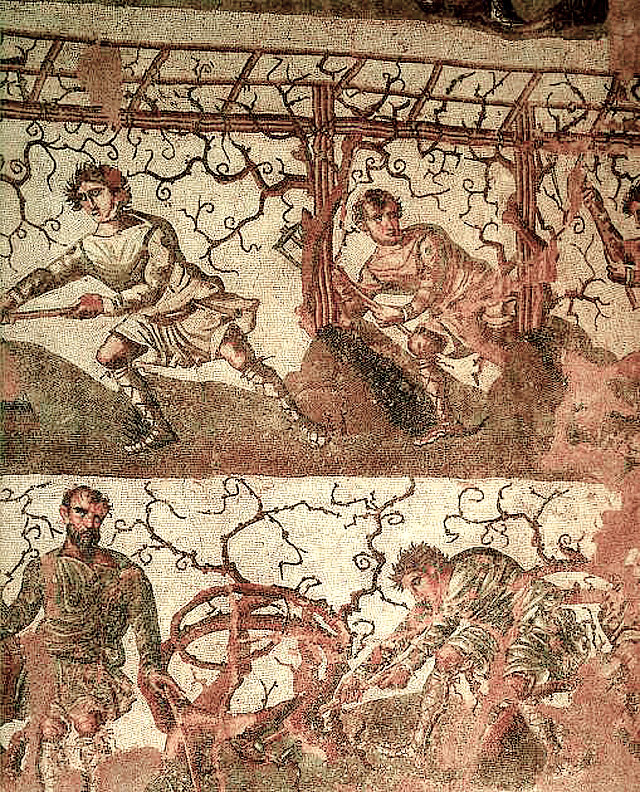
Mosaic of vineyard workers from Caesarea in Mauretania

By the end of the Western Roman Empire, nearly all of the African province was fully Romanized, according to Theodor Mommsen in his The Provinces of the Roman Empire. Roman Africans enjoyed a high level of prosperity. Such prosperity (and romanization) touched partially even the populations living outside of the Roman limes (mainly the Garamantes and the Getuli).

=== Post-Roman period and Islamic rule ===
The Roman African populations kept their Latin language, as well as their Nicene-Chalcedonian Christian religion, under the Germanic Vandal occupation, the Byzantine restoration, and the Islamic conquest, where they progressively converted to Islam until the near-extinction of Christianity in the Maghreb in the 12th century under the Almohads. The African Romance Latin dialect constituted a significant substratum of the modern varieties of the Berber languages and Maghrebi Arabic.

After their conquest, the Muslim conquerors distinguished three distinct categories of population in Northwest Africa: the foreign population from Rūm ((Eastern) Roman Empire), mainly composing the military and administrative elite, who generally spoke Greek; the Afāriqah: the Roman Africans, the native Latin-speaking community mostly concentrated in the urban areas; and finally the Barbar ( بربر ): that is, the non-Latin speaking farmers (Berbers and possibly Punics) that populated most of the rural countryside.

The willing acceptance of Roman citizenship by members of the ruling class in African cities produced such Roman Africans as the comic poet Terence, the rhetorician Fronto of Cirta, the jurist Salvius Julianus of Hadrumetum, the novelist Apuleius of Madauros, the emperor Septimius Severus of Lepcis Magna, the Christians Tertullian and Cyprian of Carthage, and Arnobius of Sicca and his pupil Lactantius; the angelic doctor Augustine of Thagaste, the epigrammatist Luxorius of Vandal Carthage, and perhaps the biographer Suetonius, and the poet Dracontius.

— Paul MacKendrick, The North African Stones Speak (1969), UNC Press, 2000, p. 326

In his 1903 work L'Algerie dans l’antiquité, French archaeologist Stéphane Gsell alleged that Berber peasants in some areas of the Aurès and Greater Kabyle regions claimed to be descendants of the Romans. In 1904 and 1905, other reports were published alleging that the Zkara tribe in Morocco claimed to be Christians and "descendants of the Romans", though they did not have a belief in the afterlife and barely any actual knowledge of Christianity, with their exact religious and cultural practices revolving more around an aversion to Islam than around any identifiable form of Christianity.

== See also ==
- African Romance
- Roman Africa (disambiguation)
- Roman colonies in Berber Africa

== Bibliography ==
- Gibbon. Edward Decline and Fall of the Roman Empire (1888)
- Southern, Pat. The Roman Empire from Severus to Constantine Routledge. London, 2001
