= Common mallow =

Common mallow is a common name used for a number of different species of Malva:

- Malva sylvestris is the common mallow in Europe and North Africa
- Malva neglecta is the common mallow in the United States
- Malva preissiana is a "common mallow" in Australia and New Zealand
