= Consentius =

5th-century Latin grammarian from Constantinople

Publius Consentius was a 5th-century Latin grammarian and the author of two treatises, which are perhaps the fragments of a complete grammar: Ars de duabus partibus orationis, nomine et verbo, on the noun and the verb, which was much used during the Carolingian period, and Ars de barbarismis et metaplasmis, on barbarisms and metaplasm. The latter refers to a third essay, De structurarum ratione, on the structure of sentences, which, if ever published, no longer exists.

Nomine et verbo was published by Johann Sichard at Basel in 1528 and subsequently, in a much more complete form, in the collection of Helias van Putschen, who had access to manuscripts that he used to rectify many deficiencies, large and small. De barbarismis was discovered by Andreas Wilhelm Cramer in a Regensburg manuscript now at Munich, and it was published at Berlin by Philipp Karl Buttmann in 1817.

Consentius is believed to have lived at Constantinople in the middle of the fifth century, and may have been the poet Consentius, his son, or his grandson. The poet and his grandson were praised by Sidonius Apollinaris, but the son may be the best candidate for the grammarian. According to Johann Albert Fabricius, in some manuscripts the grammarian is styled not only vir clarissimus, the ordinary appellation of learned men at that period, but also quintus consularis quinque civitatum, indicating that he had achieved high office and imperial favor. Consentius the son rose to high honor under Valentinian III, who named him Comes Palatii and dispatched him upon an important mission to Theodosius II.

Some of Consentius' ideas are surprisingly modern. He explicitly differentiates signifié and signifiant, the word itself and the thing signified by it. He explains grammatical gender by saying that masculine or feminine gender was ascribed, either randomly or by some consensus (seu licenter seu decenter), to some entities which lack natural gender.

== See also ==
- Consentia (gens)
