= Pompeius Grammaticus =

Latin grammarian

Pompeius Grammaticus, also known as Pompeius the Grammarian, was a Latin grammarian of the fifth century, author of a Commentary on Donatus's grammar (Commentum artis Donati).

== Biography ==
Not much is known of Pompeius' life. He taught in Africa at the end of the fifth or at the very beginning of the sixth century.

== Work ==
Pompeius is known for his commentary on Donatus, centered on the Ars maior. This commentary was intended for school education, as shown by the care taken in explaining even the most basic points.

A commentary on Virgil and a commentary on Terence were sometimes attributed to him, but these are mere hypotheses.

== Editions ==
- Heinrich Keil, Grammatici latini, t. 5, Leipzig, Teubner, 1868, p. 95-312; reprint Hidesheim, Olms, 1961.

== Bibliography ==
- Louis Holtz, « Tradition et diffusion de l'œuvre grammaticale de Pompée, commentateur de Donat », Revue de philologie, 45, 1971, p. 48-83.
- Robert A. Kaster, Guardians of Language: The Grammarian and Society in Late Antiquity (coll. Transformation of the classical heritage, 11), University of California Press, 1988, réimpr. 1997, chap. IV « Pompeius », p. 139-168 and pp. 343-346 n° 125. (Online.)
