= Albertini Tablets =

The Albertini Tablets (French: Tablettes Albertini) are a set of 33 (or 34) legal documents in Latin cursive written in ink on 45 cedarwood tablets from the years 493–496. They were discovered in 1928 by local miners in a cache on the estate of Jabal Mrata near the Algeria–Tunisia border, just south of ancient Theveste and beyond the southern frontier of the Vandal Kingdom. They are all dated by the regnal years of the Vandal king Gunthamund. They are named for Eugène Albertini, who edited the first transcription. The tablets are presently conserved at the National Museum of Antiquities and Islamic Art in Algiers, Algeria.

The place where the documents were found is Saharan pre-desert at the limit of the cultivable zone and of permanent human settlement. The tablets show that in the Vandal period arboriculture (including of olive) and floodwater irrigation were practised in the area. Besides agriculture, the tablets reveal the legal, social and economic practices in and on the fringes of the Vandal Kingdom. They also provide useful information about Late Latin grammar and phonetics.
