= Stéphane Gsell =

French historian and archaeologist (1864-1932)

- Born: 7 February 1864; Paris
- Died: 1 January 1932 (aged 67)
- Occupations: Historian; Archaeologist

Stéphane Gsell (7 February 1864 – 1 January 1932) was a French historian and archaeologist. He was a specialist in ancient Africa and Roman Algeria. His main work is L'Histoire ancienne de l'Afrique du Nord (1913-1929).

== Principal publications ==
- 1891: Fouilles dans la nécropole de Vulci, exécutées et publiées aux frais du prince de Torlonia 1891
- 1893: Essai sur le règne de l’empereur Domitien
- 1893: Recherches archéologiques en Algérie
- 1901: Les Monuments antiques de l'Algérie (2 volumes)
- 1902–1911: Atlas archéologique de l’Algérie
- 1913–1929 Histoire ancienne de l'Afrique du Nord (8 volumes)
- 1922: Inscriptions latines de l'Algérie (2 volumes)
- 1926: Promenades archéologiques aux environs d'Alger

== Bibliography ==
- « Stéphane Gsell », in Je m'appelle Byblos, Jean-Pierre Thiollet, H & D, 2005, p. 253. ISBN 2-914-266-04-9
- Michon, Étienne (1932). "Éloge funèbre de M. Stéphane Gsell, membre de l'Académie". Comptes rendus des séances de l'Académie des Inscriptions et Belles-Lettres. No. 1. pp. 7–13..
