= Salvadoran Spanish =

Variety of Spanish language

- Español salvadoreño
- Pronunciation: [espaˈɲol salβaðoˈɾeɲo]
- Native to: El Salvador
- Region: Central American Spanish
- Native speakers: 6.5 million in total (2019); L2: 19,200 (Instituto Cervantes 2019)
- Language family: Indo-European: Italic; Latino-Faliscan; Romance; Western; Ibero-Romance; West Iberian; Castilian; Spanish; North American Spanish; Central American Spanish; Salvadoran Spanish
- Early forms: Old Latin: Classical Latin; Vulgar Latin; Old Spanish; Early Modern Spanish
- Dialects: Caliche; Lenca
- Writing system: Latin (Spanish alphabet)

Official status
- Regulated by: Academia Salvadoreña de la Lengua

Language codes
- ISO 639-1: es
- ISO 639-2: spa
- ISO 639-3: –
- Glottolog: None
- IETF: es-SV
- Two varieties of Salvadoran Spanish by Azcúnuga López (2010). Caliche Lenca

Salvadoran Spanish is geographically defined as the form of Spanish spoken in the country of El Salvador. The Spanish dialect in El Salvador shares many similarities to that of its neighbors in the region, but it has its stark differences in pronunciation and usage. El Salvador, like most of Central America, uses voseo Spanish as its written and spoken form, similar to that of Argentina. Vos is used, but many Salvadorans understand tuteo. Vos can be heard in television programs and can be seen in written form in publications. Usted is used as a show of respect, when someone is speaking to an elderly person.

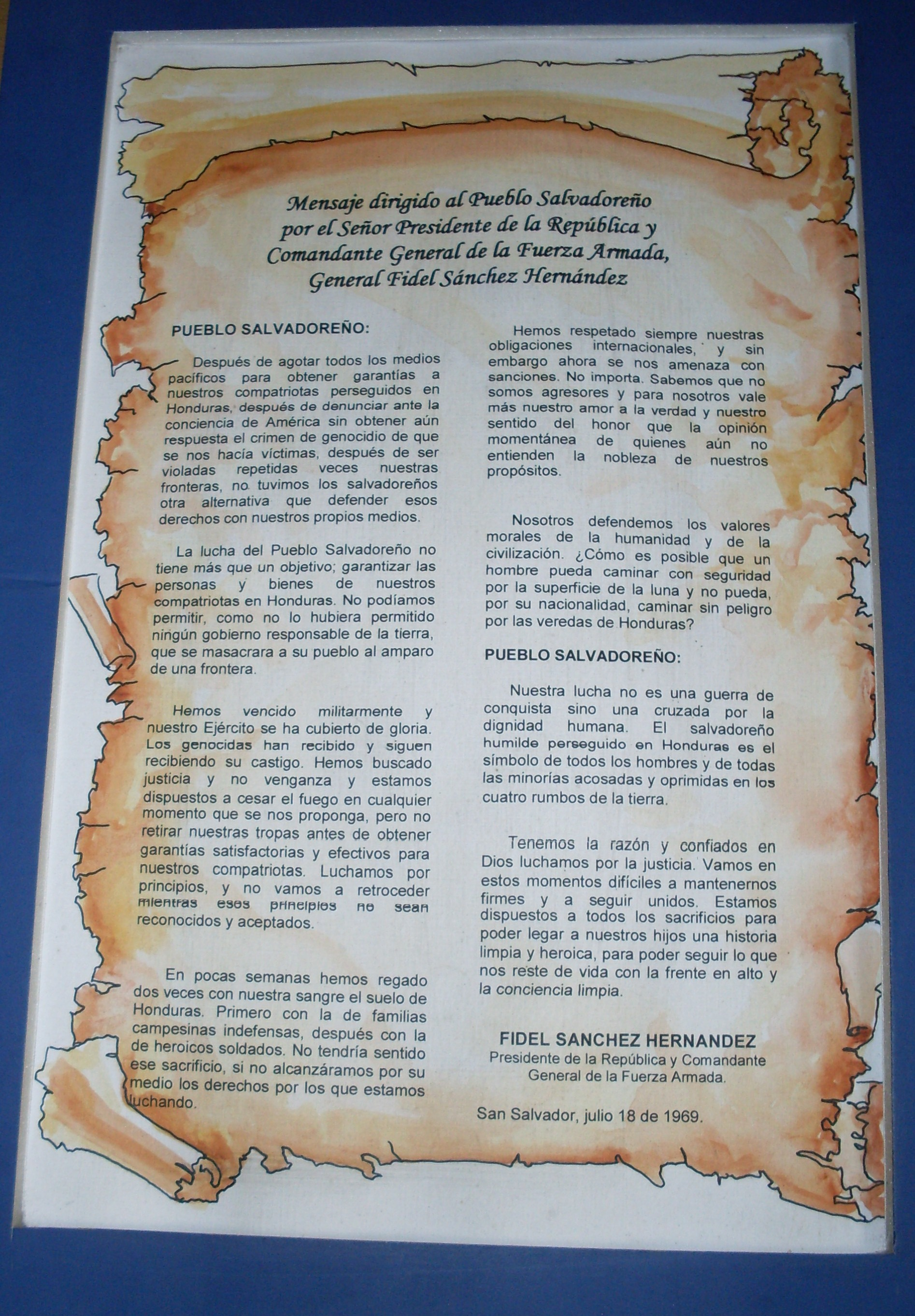
Message from President Fidel Sánchez Hernández of July 18, 1969 in the framework of the 100 Hour War

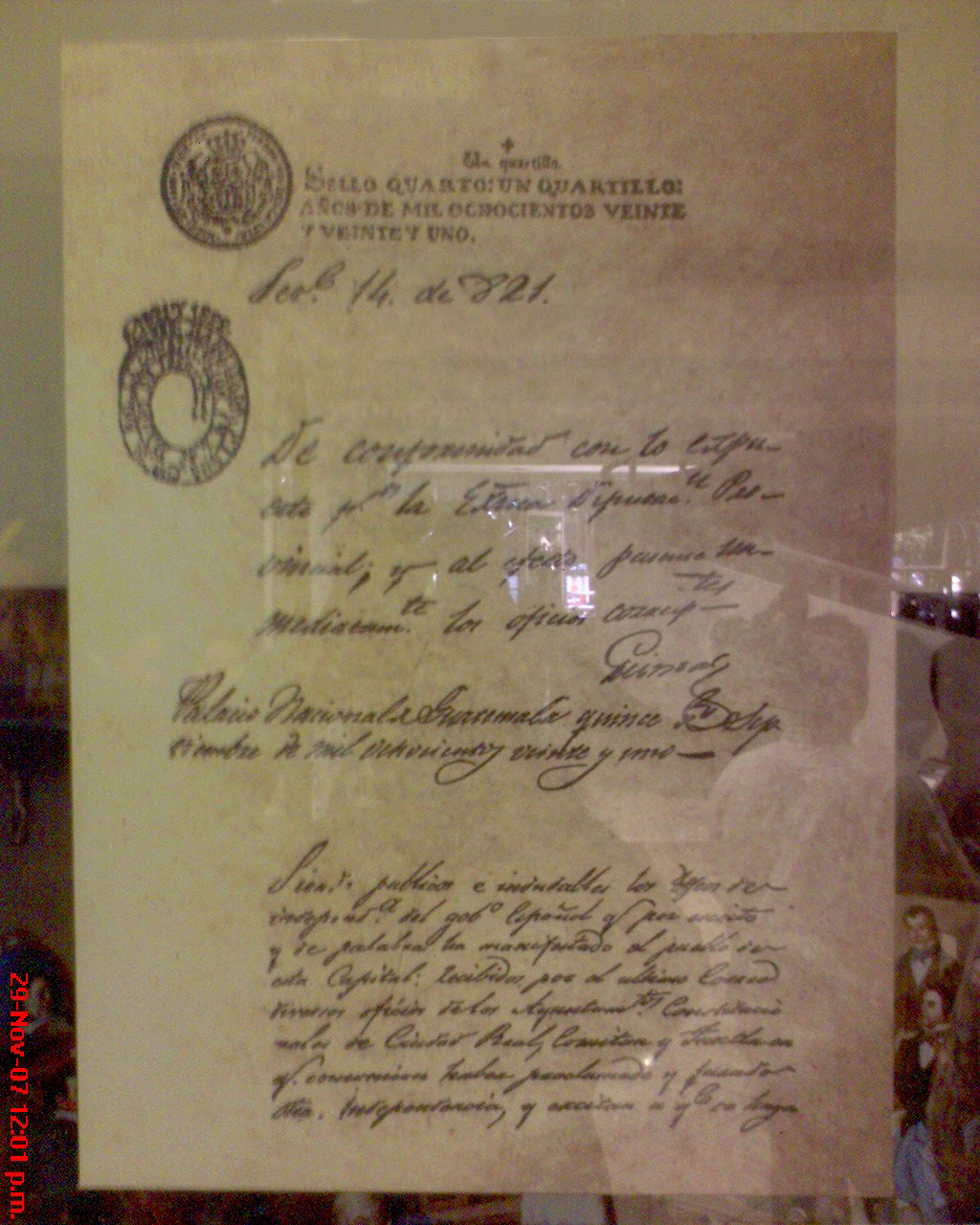
The original Act of Independence of Central America that remains in the Legislative Assembly of El Salvador

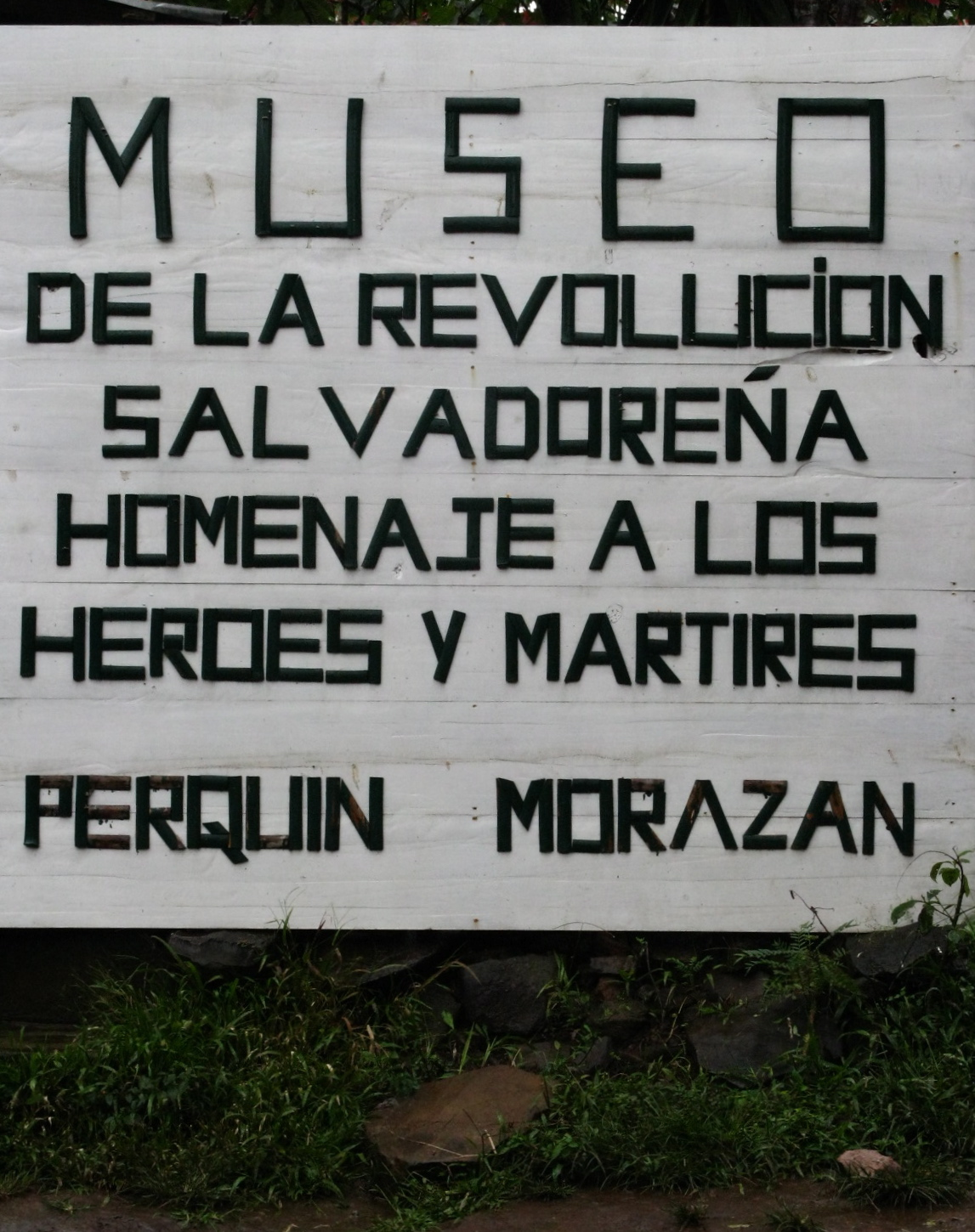
Museum of the Revolution (El Salvador)

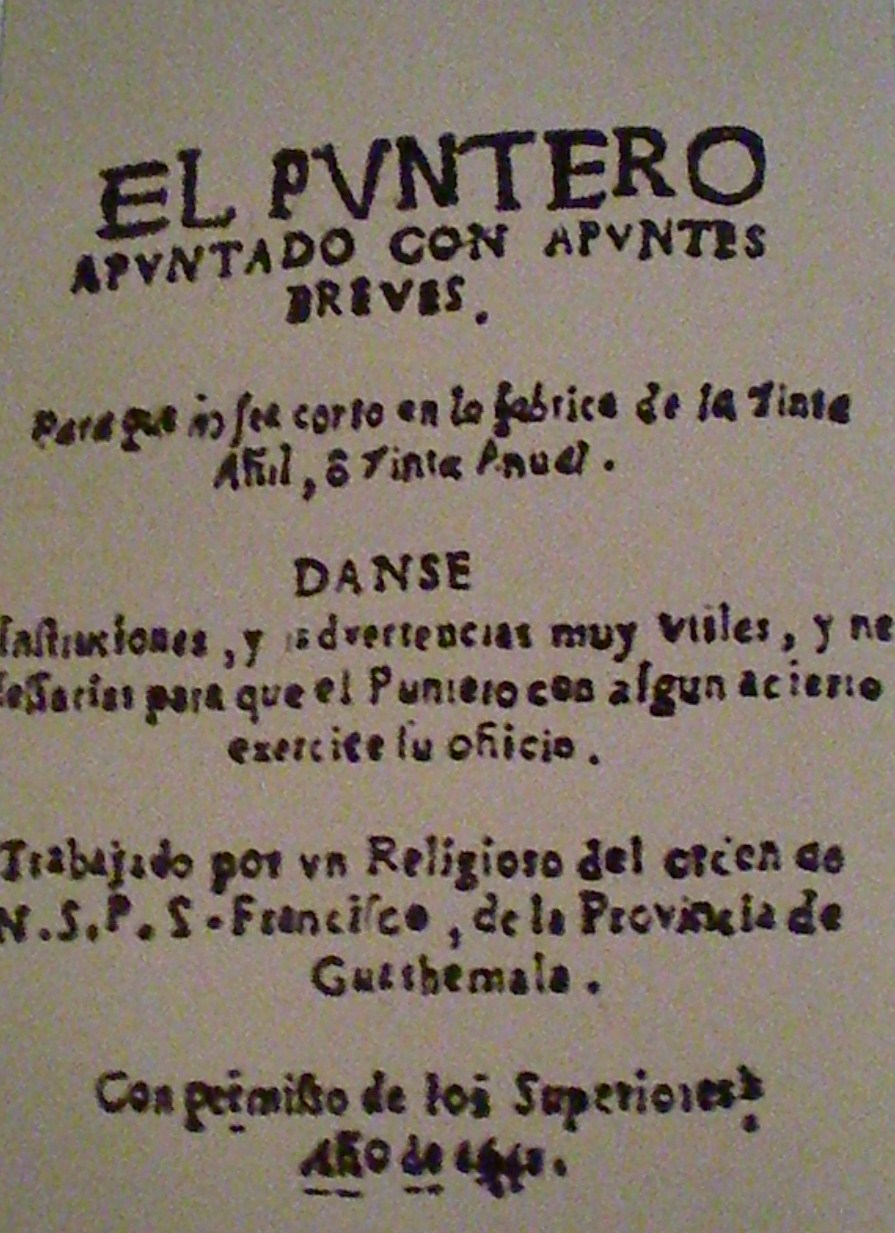
First book printed in El Salvador

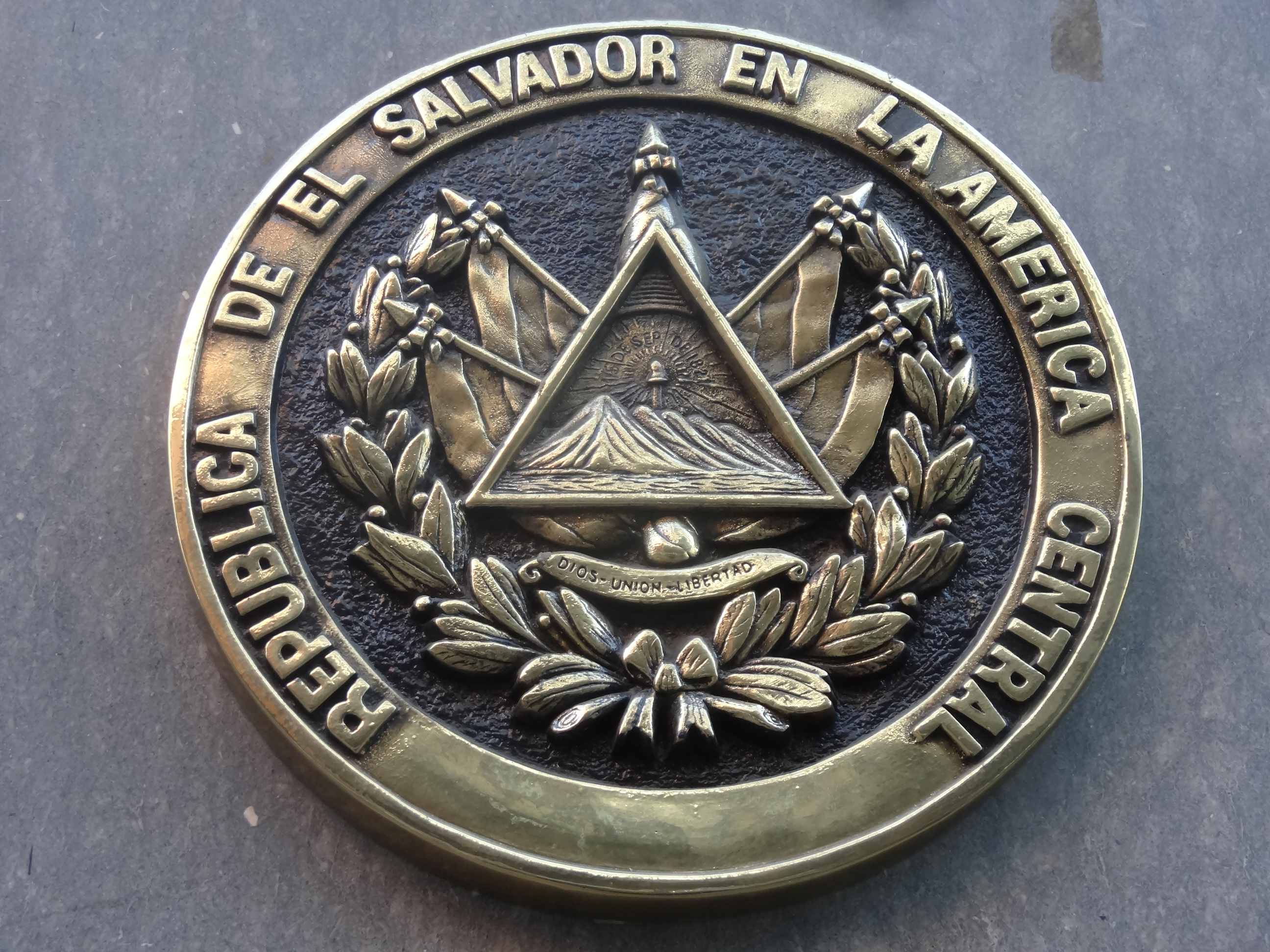
The Coat of Arms of El Salvador with its phraseology (República de El Salvador en la América Central)

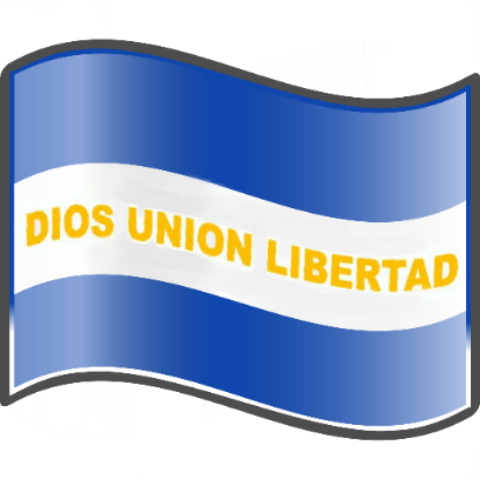
The Civil Flag of El Salvador with the country's national motto (Dios Unión Libertad)

== Phonetics and phonology ==
Notable characteristics of Salvadoran phonology include the following:

- The presence of seseo wherein /θ/ and /s/ are not distinguished. Seseo is common to Andalusian, Canarian, and all Latin American Spanish varieties.
- Syllable-final /s/ is realized as glottal [h] (mainly on the Eastern departments as Usulután and San Miguel). In the casual speech of some speakers, this may also occur syllable-initially. This is most common word-medially, in an unstressed position, as in casa [ˈkaha] 'house', and is much less common in a word-initial stressed position, as in siglo [ˈsiɣlo] 'century'. Syllable-final [s] is always or mostly pronounced in the formal speech, like TV broadcasts.
  - A voiceless fricative which sounds similar to [θ] is also used in the speech of some Salvadorans. According to Brogan 2018, this is the result of a gestural undershoot. It is on an acoustic continuum between [s] and [h], representing an intermediate degree of lenition.
- /x/ is realized as glottal [h].
- Intervocalic /d/ often disappears; the ending -ado is often [ao].
- There is no confusion between final /l/ and /r/, unlike in the Caribbean.
- Word-final /n/ is pronounced velar [ŋ].
- As El Salvador was part of the First Mexican Empire, the Salvadoran dialect adopted the voiceless alveolar affricate [t͡s] and the cluster [tl] (originally [tɬ]) represented by the respective digraphs ⟨tz⟩ and ⟨tl⟩ in loanwords of Nahuatl origin, quetzal and tlapalería [t͡ɬapaleˈɾia] ('hardware store'). Even words of Greek and Latin origin with ⟨tl⟩, such as Atlántico and atleta, are pronounced with /tl/: [aˈtlantiko], [aˈtleta] (compare [aðˈlantiko], [aðˈleta] in Spain and other dialects in Hispanic America).

== Pronouns and verb conjugation ==
=== Voseo ===
In El Salvador, as in the other Central American nations, vos is the dominant second person singular pronoun used by many speakers in familiar or informal contexts. Voseo is most commonly used among people in the same age group in addressing one another. It is common to hear young children address each other with "vos." The phenomenon also occurs among adults who address one another in familiar or informal contexts. "Vos" is also used by adults in addressing children or juveniles. However, the relationship does not reoccur when children address adults. Children address adults with usted regardless of age, status or context.

=== Ustedeo ===
"Usted" is the formal second person singular pronoun in Salvadoran Castilian. "Usted" is used in addressing foreigners formally, for acquaintances, and in business settings. Unlike nearby Costa Rica, "usted" is not the dominant second person pronoun for addressing a person.

=== Tuteo ===
Tú is hardly used, though it is occasionally present between Salvadorans who aren't imitating foreign speech. It occupies an intermediary position between vos and usted. It is used in addressing foreigners familiarly and when writing correspondence to foreigners (again in familiar contexts).

=== Postposed pronouns ===
In El Salvador, and neighboring areas of Honduras and Guatemala, vos, or more rarely usted, may be added to the end of a sentence to reiterate the listener's participation. This constitutes free use of the pronoun, unconnected to any of the arguments in the preceding sentence. Little is known about this phenomenon's origins.

== Syntax ==
In El Salvador and Guatemala it is common to place an indefinite article before a possessive pronoun, as in una mi tacita de café lit. 'a my cup of coffee'. Very rarely the possessive can be combined with a demonstrative pronoun, like aquella su idea lit. 'that his/her/their idea'. This construction was occasional in Old Spanish and still found in Judaeo-Spanish, but its frequency in El Salvador and Guatemala is due to similar constructions being found in various Mayan languages.

== Salvadoran Caliche/Caliche Salvadoreño ==
"Caliche" refers to an informal form of Salvadoran Spanish that incorporates colloquialisms and unique indigenous lexical words. It is a Nawat (Pipil)-influenced dialect of Spanish spoken in El Salvador. Many words have gone through a process of deletion, vowel assimilation, or epenthesis to make it easier for the speaker to be understood. Salvadoran Caliche is used across social classes, although professional individuals tend to avoid it because it is not considered "proper" Spanish.

This table presents examples of differences between Standard Salvadoran Spanish and Caliche:

Salvadoran Spanish	Salvadoran Caliche	English gloss
Acá, así es la situación	La onda está así	This is the situation
Dinero	pisto	Money
Un Colón salvadoreño	Un Peso/ Un bola	One Salvadoran Colon
Está difícil	Está yuca	It is difficult
Está muy ebrio/borracho	Está muy bolo/ A verga/Pedo	He/She is very drunk
Sabemos progresar	Sabemos socarla/ Le hacemos huevos	We know how to progress
Nos gusta salir a pasear	Nos gusta chotiar/Vacilar	We like to go to outings

Words like this are not unique to El Salvador, and when heard by someone who is Salvadoran or from a neighbouring country they are generally understood. Nawat's influence appears in the word chiche, which means "breast". But chiche in El Salvador also means "not easy”. Another word is guishte, which means a piece of broken glass, which comes (from Witzti “thorn”). This word does not appear in any dictionary and its origin has not been traced; the only explanatory hypothesis that has been proposed is that of Pedro Geoffroy Rivas—an anthropologist, poet, and linguist—who believed that it came from the Pipil language, since El Salvador's Spanish has been heavily influenced by it.

Unfortunately, Caliche is not described in studies on Salvadoran Spanish. The philologist John M. Lipski points out that Centro American Spanish (including the Spanish spoken in El Salvador) lacks adequate sources for linguistic and literary research. Lipski suggests that this lack reflects a failure of Salvadoran dialectology to advance as rapidly as comparative work in other Latin American nations.

== Sources ==
- Brogan, Franny D. (2018). Sociophonetically-based phonology: An Optimality Theoretic account of /s/ lenition in Salvadoran Spanish (PhD). University of California, Los Angeles.
- Brogan, Franny D.; Bolyanatz, Mariška A. (July 2018). "A sociophonetic account of onset /s/ weakening in Salvadoran Spanish: Instrumental and segmental analyses". Language Variation and Change. 30 (2): 203–230. doi:10.1017/S0954394518000066. S2CID 149803757.
- Canfield, D. Lincoln (1981). Spanish pronunciation in the Americas. Chicago: University of Chicago Press. ISBN 9780226092638.
- Hualde, José Ignacio (2005). The Sounds of Spanish. Cambridge: Cambridge University Press. ISBN 9781108817882. OCLC 56834550.
- Lipski, John M. (1984). "On the Weakening of /s/ in Latin American Spanish". Zeitschrift für Dialektologie und Linguistik. 51 (1): 31–43. JSTOR 40501902.
- Lipski, John M. (1994). Latin American Spanish. London: Longman. ISBN 9780582087606.
- Lipski, John M. (2000). "El español que se habla en El Salvador y su importancia para la dialectología hispanoamericana" (PDF). Científica (in Spanish). Universidad Don Bosco: 65–88.
- Navarro Tomás, Tomás (2004). Manual de pronunciación española (24 ed.). Madrid: Consejo Superior de Investigaciones Científicas. ISBN 9788400070960.
