= Guatemalan Spanish =

Variety of Spanish language

- Español guatemalteco
- Pronunciation: [espaˈɲol ɣwatemalˈteko]
- Native to: Guatemala
- Region: Central American Spanish
- Native speakers: 7,2 million (2014); 2,470,000 in Guatemala (2014)
- Language family: Indo-European: Italic; Latino-Faliscan; Romance; Western; Ibero-Romance; West Iberian; Castilian; Spanish; North American Spanish; Central American Spanish; Guatemalan Spanish
- Early forms: Old Latin: Classical Latin; Vulgar Latin; Old Spanish; Early Modern Spanish
- Writing system: Latin (Spanish alphabet)

Official status
- Regulated by: Academia Guatemalteca de la Lengua

Language codes
- ISO 639-1: es
- ISO 639-2: spa
- ISO 639-3: –
- Glottolog: None
- IETF: es-GT

A Kʼicheʼ activist discussing the importance of indigenous languages and cultures, in Spanish.

Guatemalan Spanish (Spanish: Español guatemalteco) is the national variant of Spanish spoken in the Central American country of Guatemala. While 93% of Guatemalans in total speak Spanish, it is the native language of only 69% of the population due to the prevalence of languages in the indigenous Mayan and Arawakan families. Guatemalans typically use the second-person singular personal pronoun vos alongside the standard Spanish second-person singular pronouns tú and usted to form a three-level system of second-person singular address.

== Phonetics and phonology ==
- The presence of seseo wherein there is no distinction between /θ/ and /s/. Seseo is common to all of Latin American Spanish, and the Andalusian and Canarian Spanish varieties in Spain.
- /x/ is realized as glottal [h].
- Syllable-final /s/ is only occasionally aspirated, and only when before consonants or a pause. It is weakened less often than in any other Central American dialect.
- Word-final /n/ is pronounced velar [ŋ].
- As Guatemala was part of the First Mexican Empire, the Guatemalan dialect adopted the voiceless alveolar affricate [t͡s] and the cluster [tl] (originally /tɬ/) represented by the respective digraphs ⟨tz⟩ and ⟨tl⟩ in loanwords of Nahuatl origin, quetzal and tlapalería [t͡ɬapaleˈɾia] ('hardware store'). Even words of Greek and Latin origin with ⟨tl⟩, such as Atlántico and atleta, are pronounced with /tl/: [aˈtlantiko], [aˈtleta] (compare [aðˈlantiko], [aðˈleta] in Spain and other dialects in Hispanic America).
- The alveolar trill /r/ is often assibilated to a fricative [ʒ]. Syllable-final /ɾ/ may also be assibilated, often sounding somewhat like [s] or [z], although this is less common among younger and urban speakers. In central Guatemala, /tɾ/ is often pronounced as an affricate, almost like English [tɹ̝̊]. This is more common after consonants as in entre 'between'. This feature is not as frequent in Guatemala as in Costa Rica, Chile, or the Andes and is less common among younger and urban speakers.

== Grammar ==
Guatemalan Spanish uses vos, alongside tú and usted as second-person singular pronouns.

In Guatemala and El Salvador, indefinite articles are commonly placed before a possessive pronoun, as in una mi tacita de café lit. 'a my cup of coffee'. Very rarely a demonstrative can go before the possessive pronoun, like aquella su idea lit. 'that his/her/their idea'. This construction was occasional in Old Spanish and is still found in Judaeo-Spanish, but its prevalence in Guatemalan and even Salvadoran Spanish is due to similar constructions appearing in several Mayan languages.

== Vocabulary ==
A number of words are widely used in Guatemala which have Mayan or other native origins such as names for flora, fauna and toponyms. Some of these words are used in most, or all, Spanish-speaking countries, such as chocolate and aguacate ("avocado"). However, some words are only used in Mexico and most Central American countries. The latter include guajolote "turkey" < Nahuatl huaxōlōtl [waˈʃoːloːt͡ɬ] (although chompipe can be used; pavo is also used as in other Spanish-speaking countries); papalote "kite" < Nahuatl pāpālōtl [paːˈpaːloːt͡ɬ] "butterfly"; and jitomate "tomato" < Nahuatl xītomatl [ʃiːˈtomat͡ɬ]. For a more complete list see List of Spanish words of Nahuatl origin. Local words include:

- chapín – Guatemalan
- chish - interjection signifying disgust
- cincho - belt
- chucho - dog
- chumpa - jacket
- canche – blond (not widespread)
- cabal – right on
- colocho - curly (usually when speaking of hair)
- ishto - kid (brat) (not widespread)
- mosh - oat porridge (more formally used is "avena")
- patojo – child (young people)
- pisto - money
- poporopos - popcorn
- shuco - Guatemalan-style hot dog; also means dirty
- sho - interjection for shut up

There are also many words unique to Central America, for example, chunche or chochadas or babosadas means "thing" or "stuff" in some places. The words used to describe children (or kids) vary among the countries in Central America; in Guatemala, they are often called patojos. In the eastern departments especially Jutiapa, cipotes is used to refer to children; meanwhile, in the western and northern departments, chamacos is used. In Guatemala, Nicaragua and Honduras, the word güiros is also used. In Guatemala as well as Honduras, Nicaragua, and El Salvador, people with money are said to have pisto, a term originally used by Maya peoples in Guatemala.

== See also ==
- Languages of Guatemala
- Central American Spanish
