= Central American Spanish =

Set of varieties of Spanish language

- Español centroamericano
- Pronunciation: [espaˈɲol sentɾoameɾiˈkano]
- Native to: Guatemala; El Salvador; Honduras; Nicaragua; Costa Rica; Belize; Chiapas (Mexico)
- Native speakers: Native: 42 million (2024); L2: 5 million (2024)
- Language family: Indo-European: Italic; Latino-Faliscan; Romance; Western; Ibero-Romance; West Iberian; Spanish; Latin American Spanish; Central American Spanish
- Early forms: Old Latin: Classical Latin; Vulgar Latin; Old Spanish; Early Modern Spanish
- Dialects: Guatemalan; Honduran; Salvadoran; Nicaraguan; Costa Rican; Belizean
- Writing system: Latin (Spanish alphabet)

Official status
- Official language in: Guatemala; El Salvador; Honduras; Nicaragua; Costa Rica
- Regulated by: Academia Guatemalteca de la Lengua; Academia Hondureña de la Lengua; Academia Salvadoreña de la Lengua; Academia Nicaragüense de la Lengua; Academia Costarricense de la Lengua

Language codes
- ISO 639-1: es
- ISO 639-2: spa
- ISO 639-3: –
- Glottolog: None
- IETF: es-GT es-BZ es-HN es-SV es-NI es-CR
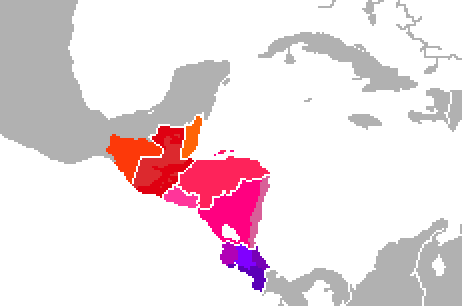
- Varieties of Central American Spanish

Central American Spanish (Spanish: español centroamericano or castellano centroamericano) is the general name of the Spanish language dialects spoken in Central America. More precisely, the term refers to the Spanish language as spoken in Costa Rica, El Salvador, Guatemala, Honduras and Nicaragua. Panamanian Spanish is considered a variety of Caribbean Spanish, it is transitional between Central American and Caribbean dialects.

== Phonetics and phonology ==
Some characteristics of Central American phonology include:

- /s/ at the end of a syllable or before a consonant is pronounced like [h] quite often in the three central nations of El Salvador, Honduras and Nicaragua. This is less frequent in formal speech, like TV broadcasts. In the casual speech of some Salvadoran and Honduran speakers, this may also occur syllable or even word-initially.
- j (/x/), is aspirated; it is soft as the /h/ in English (e.g.: Yahoo).
- /ʝ/ (⟨y⟩ or ⟨ll⟩) frequently disappears when in contact with /i/ or after /e/.
- Word final /n/ is velarized, being pronounced as a velar nasal [ŋ].
- Both central Guatemala and central Costa Rica have a tendency to assibilate /r/.
- Use of seseo.

Most phonological features of Central American Spanish are similar to Andalusian, Canarian, and Caribbean, and most other coastal Latin American Spanish dialects.

== Voseo ==
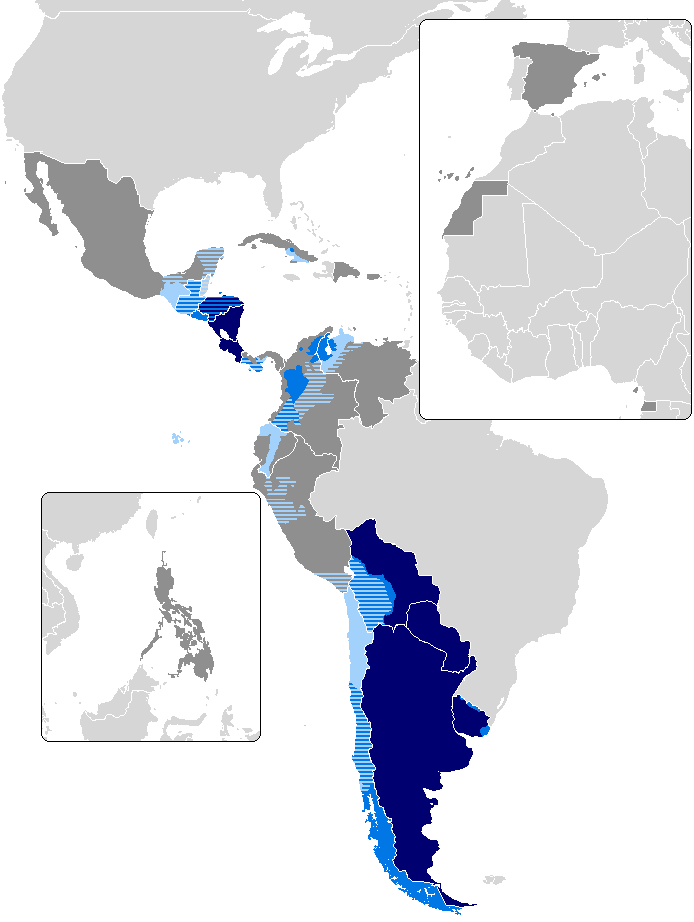
In this map of voseo countries, the spread of the pronoun in Central America is clearly illustrated.

The most common form for the second person singular in informal contexts in Central America is vos. usted is the dominant second person singular pronoun in formal or polite contexts. Vos is used in Spanish-speaking Central America, with the exception of Panama, among family members, close friends, and in other informal situations. When addressing strangers, usted is used. In a friendlier but still formal environment, tú might be appropriate, depending on the country. The Panamanian department of Chiriquí and the Mexican state of Chiapas are two regions where vos is commonly heard.

Voseo originates in a formal form of address (roughly equivalent to modern usted) that eventually began to be used among peers in Spain. While condemned by Antonio de Nebrija on the first Spanish language grammar in 1492, the change in usage was slower, as in the Americas it became associated with lower classes or in despective usage to servants and indigenous people. Scholar Carlos Gagini claims Spaniards that migrated kept the usage as to pretend noble origins.

The use of voseo enjoys low prestige in formal usage and is often considered incorrect. Officially, all of Central America is tuteante, however Sandinista Nicaragua adopted voseo as a symbol of nationalism. Educated Costa Ricans are also more comfortable using vos, and negative attitudes towards voseo have been changing as of late. Using vos between two acquainted males implies trust, while the usage of tú might be perceived as effeminate; conversely, in a male-female conversation, the usage of tú can be perceived as respectful and polite.

The imperative of verbs used with vos is formed by dropping the final -R of the infinitive, and then adding an acute accent to the final vowel to retain the stress:

Verb	Meaning	Vos
ser	"to be"	sé
ir	"to go"	andá
hablar	"to speak"	hablá
callar	"to become silent"	callá
soltar	"to release/let go"	soltá
comer	"to eat"	comé
mover	"to move"	mové
venir	"to come"	vení
poner	"to put"	poné
salir	"to leave"	salí
tener	"to have"	tené
decir	"to say"	decí
pedir	"to ask (for)/order"	pedí

The only irregular conjugation in the imperative is the verb ir and ser.

The conjugation of the present tense follows the pattern of replacing the final -R of the infinitive with an -S and adding an acute accent to the previous vowel:

Infinitive	Vos	Tú
oir	oís	oyes
venir	venís	vienes
decir	decís	dices
dormir	dormís	duermes
sentir	sentís	sientes
salir	salís	sales
concluir	concluís	concluyes
poder	podés	puedes
querer	querés	quieres
mover	movés	mueves
tener	tenés	tienes
pensar	pensás	piensas
contar	contás	cuentas
jugar	jugás	juegas
cantar	cantás	cantas
errar	errás	erras

Note how the conjugation of vos presents fewer irregularities compared to tú.

The main difference of the voseo in Argentina is the conjugation of the subjunctive. Rioplatense Spanish prefers the subjunctive forms of tú, whereas in Central America, the vos forms are retained.

The pronoun usted is used when addressing older, unfamiliar or respected persons, as it is in most Spanish-speaking countries; however, in Costa Rica, Guatemala, and Honduras it is frequently used with younger people, and in Honduras between husband and wife, and friends. In Nicaragua, the pronoun is only used among youth during special or formal occasions or when addressing unfamiliar individuals in a formal manner. It's also used with most, if not all, profanities familiar to the region.

=== Pronouns and verb conjugation ===
As previously mentioned, one of the features of the Central American speaking style is the voseo: the usage of the pronoun vos for the second person singular, instead of tú. In some Spanish-speaking regions where voseo is used, it is sometimes considered a non-standard lower-class or regional variant, whereas in other regions voseo is standard. Vos is used with forms of the verb that resemble those of the second person plural (vosotros) in Spanish from Spain.

Some people prefer to say "tú" instead of "vos" while conjugating the verbs using the vos forms; for instance: tú cantás, tú bailás, tú podés, etc. This is avoided in Southern Central America, especially in Costa Rica and Nicaragua where is associated with bad education by mixing 2 different pronouns (tú-vos).

The second person plural pronoun, which is vosotros in Spain, is replaced with ustedes in C. American Spanish, like most other Latin American dialects. While usted is the formal second person singular pronoun, its plural ustedes has a neutral connotation and can be used to address friends and acquaintances as well as in more formal occasions (see T-V distinction). Ustedes takes a grammatically third person plural verb. Usted is particularly used in Costa Rica between strangers, with foreign people and used by the vast majority of the population in Alajuela and rural areas of the country.

As an example, see the conjugation table for the verb amar in the present tense, indicative mode:

Inflection of amar
Person/Number	Peninsular	C. American
1st sing.	yo amo	yo amo
2nd sing.	tú amas	vos amás
3rd sing.	él ama	él ama
1st plural	nosotros amamos	nosotros amamos
2nd plural	vosotros amáis	²ustedes aman
3rd plural	ellos aman	ellos aman

(²) Ustedes is used throughout all of Latin America for both the familiar and formal. In Spain, it is used only in formal speech for the second person plural.

Although apparently there is just a stress shift (from amas to amás), the origin of such a stress is the loss of the diphthong of the ancient vos inflection from vos amáis to vos amás. This can be better seen with the verb "to be": from vos sois to vos sos. In vowel-alternating verbs like perder and morir, the stress shift also triggers a change of the vowel in the root:

Inflection of perder
Peninsular	C. American
yo pierdo	yo pierdo
tú pierdes	vos perdés
él pierde	él pierde
nosotros perdemos	nosotros perdemos
vosotros perdéis	ustedes pierden
ellos pierden	ellos pierden

For the -ir verbs, the Peninsular vosotros forms end in -ís, so there is no diphthong to simplify, and Central American vos employs the same form: instead of tú vives, vos vivís; instead of tú vienes, vos venís (note the alternation).

The imperative forms for vos are identical to the plural imperative forms in Peninsular minus the final -d (stress remains the same):

- Hablá más alto, por favor. "Speak louder, please." (hablad in Peninsular)
- Comé un poco de torta. "Eat some cake." (comed in Peninsular)
- Vení para acá. "Come over here." (venid in Peninsular)

The plural imperative uses the ustedes form (i. e. the third person plural subjunctive, as corresponding to ellos).

As for the subjunctive forms of vos verbs, most speakers use the classical vos conjugation, employing the vosotros form minus the i in the final diphthong. However, some prefer to use the tú subjunctive forms like in Paraguay.

- Espero que veas or Espero que veás "I hope you can see" (Peninsular veáis)
- Lo que quieras or (less used) Lo que querás "Whatever you want" (Peninsular queráis)

In the preterite form, an s is often added, for instance (vos) perdistes. This corresponds to the classical vos conjugation found in literature. Compare Iberian Spanish form vosotros perdisteis. However, the trailing 's' is deemed incorrect and a faux-pas in educated use of 'vos'.

Other verb forms coincide with tú after the i is omitted (the vos forms are the same as tú).

- Si salieras "If you went out" (Peninsular salierais)

=== Usage of tenses ===
Although literary works use the full spectrum of verb inflections, in colloquial Central American Spanish (as well as many other Spanish dialects), the future tense has been replaced by a verbal phrase (periphrasis) in the spoken language.

This verb phrase is formed by the verb ir ("go") followed by the preposition a and the main verb in the infinitive. This is akin to the English verbal phrase going to + infinitive verb. For example:

- Creo que descansaré un poco → Creo que voy a descansar un poco
- Mañana me visitará mi madre → Mañana me va a visitar mi madre
- Iré a visitarla mañana → Voy a ir a visitarla mañana

The present perfect (Spanish: Pretérito perfecto compuesto), just like pretérito anterior, is rarely used; so, it's replaced by simple past.

- Juan no ha llegado → Juan no llegó todavía
- El torneo ha comenzado → El torneo comenzó

== Lexicon ==
There are also many words unique to Central America.

For example, chunche or chochadas can be used to mean "thing" or "stuff."

In Guatemala, Honduras, and El Salvador, chucho means dog. In the same three countries, money is called pisto, a term derived from the Spanish dish pisto. However, plata (lit. "silver") is a common slang word used to mean "money" in all Central American countries except Belize.

Also, local words can vary by country and even department:

Colloquial Terms That Vary By Country
English term	Nicaragua	Guatemala	Jutiapa, Guatemala	El Salvador	Honduras	Costa Rica	Panama
children	chavalo/a, cipote/a, chigüín	patojos	cipotes		cipotes, güirros, chigüín	güilas, carajillos	pelaítos
corner store	venta, pulperia	tienda, bodega	tienda, bodega	tienda	pulpería (trucha in the north)	pulpería, abastecedor	tienda
soda / pop	gaseosa	agua	gaseosa	gaseosa, soda	fresco	gaseosa, refresco, fresco	soda

== See also ==
- Spanish dialects and varieties
- Guatemalan Spanish
- Salvadoran Spanish
- Honduran Spanish
- Nicaraguan Spanish
- Costa Rican Spanish
