= Nicaraguan Spanish =

Variety of Spanish language

- Español nicaragüense
- Pronunciation: [espaˈɲol nikaɾaˈɣwense]
- Native to: Nicaragua
- Region: Central American Spanish
- Native speakers: 5.3 million (2014); 577,000 in Nicaragua (2014)
- Language family: Indo-European: Italic; Latino-Faliscan; Romance; Western; Ibero-Romance; West Iberian; Castilian; Spanish; North American Spanish; Central American Spanish; Nicaraguan Spanish
- Early forms: Old Latin: Classical Latin; Vulgar Latin; Old Spanish; Early Modern Spanish
- Writing system: Latin (Spanish alphabet)

Official status
- Regulated by: Academia Nicaragüense de la Lengua

Language codes
- ISO 639-1: es
- ISO 639-2: spa
- ISO 639-3: –
- Glottolog: None
- IETF: es-NI

Spanish is the official language of Nicaragua. Nicaraguan Spanish (Spanish: español nicaragüense) is geographically defined as the form of Spanish spoken in Nicaragua. Affectionately, Nicaraguan Spanish is often called Nicañol.

The Spanish dialect in Nicaragua is heavily influenced by Nahuatl and Nawat in its vocabulary and substrate. The Nawat language was spoken by the Nicarao people who inhabit the western half of the country. Despite its extinction in Nicaragua, words of Nahuatl and Nawat origin can be seen and heard in daily Nicaraguan speech and literature.

Nicaragua has the highest frequency, among Central American countries, of the use of voseo—use of the pronoun vos and its verb forms for the familiar second-person singular ("you"), in place of the tú of Standard Spanish. In this regard it is similar to the usage of Argentina and Uruguay in the Río de la Plata region of South America. Vos is used frequently in colloquial and familiar settings, but Nicaraguans also understand tuteo. The use of "vos" can be heard in television programs and can be seen in written form in publications.

In the North Caribbean Coast Autonomous Region and the South Caribbean Coast Autonomous Region, language and pronunciation is strongly influenced by Indigenous and creole languages such as Miskito, Rama, Sumo, Miskito Coastal Creole, Jamaican Patois, Garifuna and Rama Cay Creole but Spanish has become the main language spoken.

== Origins ==
The Nicaraguan accent, like most New World Spanish, dates back to the 16th century in Andalusia. It shares later developments of Andalusian Spanish with that of Cuba, the Dominican Republic and the Caribbean/coastal regions of Venezuela, Colombia, Panama, and Puerto Rico. Nicaragua's relative isolation from Spain, however, and, to an extent, from other nations, fostered the development of the Nicaraguan accent, which did not change in the same ways that the Andalusian, Canarian, or other Spanish-American accents did.

Most Central American Dialects have their origins in Guatemala because most dialects grew in Captaincy General of Guatemala.

During its history, Nicaraguan Spanish has acquired many indigenous influences and several distinguishing characteristics. Until the 19th century, a hybrid form of Nahuat-Spanish was the common language of Nicaragua. Today, Nahuat, Mangue, Mayan and Chibcha words, along with their respective syntax, can be found in everyday speech. Also, as Nicaragua was a center-point of Mesoamerican and South American indigenous groups, there are a number of words widely used in Nicaragua which have Matagalpan, Chibcha, Miskito, Nahuatl, or other native origins, in particular names for flora, fauna and toponyms.

== Pronunciation ==
Notable characteristics of Nicaraguan phonology include the following:

- The presence of Seseo wherein /θ/ and /s/ are not distinguished. Seseo is common to Andalusian and Canarian Spanish varieties.
- Syllable-final /s/ is realized as glottal [h] (except in the southern departments of Rio San Juan and Rivas, and in the formal speech, like TV broadcasts).
  - Syllable final /s/-aspiration occurs to a greater extent in Nicaraguan Spanish than in the other Central American dialects. Nicaraguans retain phrase-final h more often than Caribbean speakers, and rarely fully elide pre-consonantal /s/.
- /x/ is realized as glottal [h].
- Intervocalic /d/ often disappears; the ending -ado is often [ao].
- There is no confusion between /l/ and /r/, as in the Caribbean.
- Word-final /n/ is pronounced velar [ŋ].
- Word-final voiceless stops (/p/, /t/, /k/—rare in native Spanish words, but occurring in many words borrowed from English) are often merged in pronunciation as [k]. The Costa Rican ice cream shop Pops, with franchises in other Central American countries, is pronounced in certain regions of Nicaragua as Pocs. Internet is sometimes pronounced * Internec; cenit is pronounced * cenic; laptop is pronounced * lactoc; and robot pronounced * roboc. This is sometimes extended to native Spanish words where such stops are found at the end of a syllable. For example, aceptar is sometimes pronounced * acectar.
- As Nicaragua was part of First Mexican Empire, Nicaraguan dialect adopted the voiceless alveolar affricate [t͡s] and the cluster [tl] (originally /tɬ/) represented by the respective digraphs <tz> and <tl> in loanwords of Nahuatl origin, like quetzal and tlapalería [t͡ɬapaleˈɾia] ('hardware store'). Even words of Greek and Latin origin with <tl>, such as Atlántico and atleta, are pronounced with /tl/: [aˈtlantiko], [aˈtleta] (compare [aðˈlantiko], [aðˈleta] in Spain and other dialects in Hispanic America).

== Second person singular pronouns ==
=== Vos ===
Vos is the predominant second person singular pronoun used by most speakers in familiar or informal contexts to address people in the same age group. Vos is also used by adults in addressing children or juveniles, but children address adults with usted, though this is changing in the 21st century.

==== Conjugations with the vos pronoun ====
Nicaraguan voseo is both pronominal and verbal; that is, speakers use the pronoun vos and the characteristic final-stressed verb forms. See Voseo

==== Affirmative Imperative ====
See Voseo Affirmative Imperative

The affirmative imperative in Nicaraguan voseo—like that of Rioplatense Spanish—places stress on the last syllable. For example, ¡Ven acá! or ¡Ven aquí! becomes ¡Vení!

Verb	Meaning	Tú	Vos	Vosotros
ser	"to be"	sé	sé	sed
ir	"to go"	ve	andá	id
hablar	"to speak"	habla	hablá	hablad
callar	"to become silent"	calla	callá	callad
soltar	"to release/let go"	suelta	soltá	soltad
comer	"to eat"	come	comé	comed
mover	"to move"	mueve	mové	moved
venir	"to come"	ven	vení	venid
poner	"to put"	pon	poné	poned
salir	"to leave"	sal	salí	salid
tener	"to have"	ten	tené	tened
decir	"to say"	di	decí	decid
pedir	"to ask/order"	pide	pedí	pedid

=== Usted ===
Usted is the formal second person singular pronoun in Nicaraguan Spanish, as in almost all modern varieties of Spanish. Usted is used in addressing elderly people, authorities, foreigners formally and in business settings. In contrast to neighboring Costa Rica, Nicaraguans are more inclined to address a casual acquaintance as vos, rather than usted.

=== Tú ===
Tú is hardly used in Nicaraguan Spanish, except in addressing foreigners familiarly, in speech or in writing. Due in part to the influence of Mexican, Colombian, and Venezuelan television programming, Nicaraguans are familiar with tuteo, and some television viewers, especially children, have begun to use it in limited contexts.

== Vocabulary ==
A number of words widely used in Nicaragua which have Nahuatl, Chibcha or other native origins, in particular names for flora, fauna and toponyms. Some of these words are used in most, or all, Spanish-speaking countries, like chocolate and aguacate ("avocado"). For a more complete list, see List of Spanish words of Nahuatl origin. Certain words that are ubiquitous in Nicaraguan Spanish may not be immediately recognizable to non-Nicaraguans:

- ahuevado: (adj.) It means to be worried, . Similar to "preocupado" or "afligido".
- boludo: lazy.
- bróder: friend, brother, companion.
- cachipil/cachimbo: a lot, a large quantity.
- caite: form of leather shoe typically worn and made by campesinos.
- caponera: auto rickshaw, motorized tricycles.
- chavalo/a: adolescent or young person; child.
- chayúl: gnat, fruit flies.
- chimbomba: balloon.
- chochada: something unimportant; nonsense (usually as a comment in regard to someone's words).
- chompipe: turkey.
- chunche: an all-purpose word that's loosely translated to mean "that" or "thing"
- cipote/chigüin: brat, punk; small child.
- cuecho: gossip.
- cumiche: baby of the family, the youngest son or daughter.
- encachimbado: angry, furious, disgusted. Angrier than "arrecho".
- enturcado: angry as well. In the same intensity of "encachimbado".
- goma: hangover (estar de goma).
- guaro: liquor, usually rum.
- ideay: expression of surprise; means: What's up?.
- ipegüe: baker's dozen (13 items) .
- maje: depending on context, it can refer to a friend, a third person (in a familiar manner).
- nica, nicoya}}: (noun, colloquial) Nicaraguan.
- pajilla/sorbete: drinking straw.
- pegue: workplace or any job.
- pinche: stingy, cheapskate
- pinolero/a: (noun, colloquial) a Nicaraguan person.
- pulpería: grocery store.
- salvaje: (colloquial) awesome, impressive.
- tamal: thief, crook.
- tapudo: liar or bigmouth.
- tuanis: very nice or pleasing, of high quality (often applied to clothing).
- zancudo: mosquito.
- mazorca: husk of corn

== See also ==
- Spanish language in the Americas
- Central American Spanish
- Seseo
- Voseo
