= Costa Rican Spanish =

Variety of Spanish language

- Español costarricense
- Pronunciation: [espaˈɲol kostariˈsense]
- Native to: Costa Rica
- Region: Central American Spanish
- Native speakers: 5,130,000 (2023)
- Language family: Indo-European: Italic; Latino-Faliscan; Romance; Western; Ibero-Romance; West Iberian; Castilian; Spanish; North American Spanish; Central American Spanish; Costa Rican Spanish
- Early forms: Old Latin: Classical Latin; Vulgar Latin; Old Spanish; Early Modern Spanish
- Writing system: Latin (Spanish alphabet)

Official status
- Regulated by: Academia Costarricense de la Lengua

Language codes
- ISO 639-1: es
- ISO 639-2: spa
- ISO 639-3: –
- Glottolog: None
- IETF: es-CR

Costa Rican Spanish (Spanish: español costarricense) is the form of the Spanish language spoken in Costa Rica. It is one of the dialects of Central American Spanish. Nevertheless, because the country was more remote than its neighbors, the development of this variety of Spanish followed a distinct path.

Today, despite the relatively small size of the country, each province maintains unique characteristics in pronunciation and lexicon. For instance, Guanacaste Province's variety bears similarity to that of Nicaragua, while the tú form can be found more toward the border with Panama.

== Phonetics and Phonology ==
The distinguishing characteristics of Costa Rican phonetics include the following:

- Assibilation of the "double-R" phoneme in some speakers (spelled ⟨r⟩ word-initially and ⟨rr⟩ intervocalically), especially in rural areas, resulting in a voiced alveolar approximant (/ɹ/)—thus ropa [ˈɹopa] ("clothing"), carro [ˈkaɹo] ("car"). Assibilation also affects the sequence /tɾ/, giving it a sound that is similar to [tɹ̝̥].
- The double-R phoneme and the single-R phoneme after a t, can also be realized as voiced alveolar approximant [ɹ] by the majority of speakers, with a sound similar to the /r/ of American English. Thus ropa [ˈɹopa] ("clothing"), carro [ˈkaɹo] ("car") and cuatro ['kwatɹo] ("four"). Except before a consonant (this does not apply to all speakers) in which case is pronounced as a voiced alveolar trill [r] . Thus puerta [ˈpwerta] ("door"), guardar [ɡwarˈðaɹ] ("to save").

Note: This does not apply to the single-R phoneme which is typically pronounced as an alveolar tap [ɾ] as in most varieties of Spanish.

- Velarization of word-final /n/ (before a pause or a vowel), i.e. pronunciation as the velar nasal [ŋ].
- /ʝ/ can be lost in contact with the front vowels /e/ and /i/.
- The Costa Rican dialect adopted the voiceless alveolar affricate [t͡s] and the cluster [tl] (originally /tɬ/) represented by the respective digraphs ⟨tz⟩ and ⟨tl⟩ in loanwords of Nahuatl origin, for example quetzal and tlapalería [t͡ɬapaleˈɾia] ('hardware store'). Even words of Greek and Latin origin with ⟨tl⟩, such as Atlántico and atleta, are pronounced with /tl/: [aˈtlantiko], [aˈtleta] (compare [aðˈlantiko], [aðˈleta] in Spain and other dialects in Hispanic America).
- Syllable-final /s/ is only infrequently aspirated, or pronounced as an [h], among middle-class speakers in central Costa Rica. It may be aspirated most often at the end of a word and before another word which begins in a vowel, but /s/ still occurs most of the time. Costa Rica's border regions with Panama show higher rates of /s/-reduction (syllable-final /s/ is pronounced in border regions of Costa Rica and Nicaragua).
- Between vowels, /s/ is frequently voiced. This is most common in faster, spontaneous speech, before unstressed vowels, and word-finally, and is also more common among men than women.
- The phoneme represented by ⟨j⟩, /x/, is typically just a weak aspiration, like [h]. In words like trabajo 'work', it can barely be heard.

== Second person singular pronouns ==
=== Usted ===
Usted is the predominant second person singular pronoun in Costa Rican Spanish. Young men have been leading a trend in addressing close friends and peers with usted, which is not typical of other Spanish dialects. Some speakers use only usted in addressing others, never vos or tú. Others use both usted and vos, according to the situation.

=== Vos ===
Vos is a second person singular pronoun used by many speakers in certain relationships of familiarity or informal contexts. Voseo is widely used between friends, family, people of the same age, etc. It is also commonly used in the university context between students. Some adults use vos to address children or juveniles, but other adults address everyone regardless of age or status with usted. Costa Ricans tend to use usted with foreigners. Vos has become less popular in adults below the age of thirty, as of 2016.

=== Tú ===
Tú is occasionally used in Costa Rican Spanish. However, due in part to the influence of Mexican television programming, Costa Ricans are familiar with tuteo, and some television viewers, especially children, have begun to use it in limited contexts. It used to be much rarer, and is often considered not really "Costa Rican." As of 2016, young adults use tú as infrequently as do older adults.

== Tiquismos ==
Costa Ricans are colloquially called "ticos" (based on the frequent use of the diminutive ending -ico following a /t/, as in momentico), and thus colloquial expressions characteristic of Costa Rica are called tiquismos. Tiquismos and pachuquismos are used frequently in Costa Rica. The latter are expressions of popular street Spanish which can be considered vulgar and offensive if used in the wrong context. Many of these words, even when found in a standard Spanish dictionary, do not have the same meaning there as in Costa Rica. Learning colloquial expressions can be a guide to understanding the humor and character of the Costa Rican culture.

Here are some examples of Costa Rican slang.

- Mae, ese chante es muy tuanis: "Dude, that house is pretty cool".
- Esta panta no me cuadra porque me chima las piernas: "I don’t like these shorts because they chafe my legs".
- ¡Qué taco me dio esa vara!: "That thing really scared me!"

== Bibliography ==
- Canfield, D. Lincoln (1981), Spanish Pronunciation in the Americas, Chicago: University of Chicago Press, ISBN 978-0-226-09262-1
- Howard, Christopher (2010), Christopher Howard's Official Guide to Costa Rican Spanish, Miami: Costa Rica Books, ISBN 978-1-881233-87-9
- Lipski, John M. (1994), Latin American Spanish, Longman, ISBN 978-0-582-08761-3
- Lipski, John M. (2008). "Central American Spanish in the United States". Varieties of Spanish in the United States. Washington, D.C.: Georgetown University Press. pp. 142–149. ISBN 9781589012134.
- Navarro Tomás, Tomás (2004). Manual de pronunciación española (24 ed.). Madrid: Consejo Superior de Investigaciones Científicas. ISBN 9788400070960.

== See also ==
- Latin American Spanish
