= Honduran Spanish =

Variety of Spanish language

- Español hondureño
- Pronunciation: [espaˈɲol onduˈɾeɲo]
- Native to: Honduras
- Region: Central American Spanish
- Native speakers: 10,637,827 (2023)
- Language family: Indo-European: Italic; Latino-Faliscan; Romance; Western; Ibero-Romance; West Iberian; Castilian; Spanish; North American Spanish; Central American Spanish; Honduran Spanish
- Early forms: Old Latin: Classical Latin; Vulgar Latin; Old Spanish; Early Modern Spanish
- Writing system: Latin (Spanish alphabet)

Official status
- Regulated by: Academia Hondureña de la Lengua

Language codes
- ISO 639-1: es
- ISO 639-2: spa
- ISO 639-3: –
- Glottolog: None
- IETF: es-HN

A Honduran woman discussing her country, Latin American identity, and different accents of the Spanish language, in Spanish.

Honduran Spanish is the Spanish language as spoken in the country of Honduras in Central America. Voseo is routinely used in Honduras.

== Phonology ==
- Honduran Spanish, as a Central American variety, pronounces the fricative /x/, written with ⟨j⟩ or ⟨g⟩, as a simple aspiration [h].
- /ʝ/ is at times elided in contact with front vowels.
- Word-final /n/ becomes velarized, as [ŋ].
- /s/ is often aspirated or elided in word- or syllable-final position. As an apparent extension of this, it may even be aspirated in word-initial or word-medial, syllable-initial environments. This word-medial aspiration is most common near morpheme boundaries, and in the pronoun nosotros, 'we'. S-reduction is most common in the north of Honduras. It is less common in areas of Copán Department near the Guatemalan border, in Comayagua, and among the upper classes of Tegucigalpa.

== Local words ==
These words are some slang words used in Honduras. Some may also be used in neighboring El Salvador and elsewhere.

Honduran Spanish	Gloss
bululo	bread roll
trucha	corner shop
pulpería	corner shop
relajo	mess
jura	police patrol
chepo	police patrol
posta	police station
maje	dude
cipote	boy
güirro	boy
cipota	girl
güirra	girl
juco	dirty man
juca	dirty woman
colocho	curls (in reference to hair)
chongo	bow (gift wrapping)
encachimbar	to annoy, to upset
bolo	drunk
goma	hangover
paila	bucket
carro paila	pick-up truck
pisto	money
billullo	money
chabacán	troublemaker
guachiman	security guard (from English 'watchman')
