= Caribbean Spanish =

Set of varieties of Spanish language

Varieties of Caribbean Spanish

Caribbean Spanish (Spanish: español caribeño [espaˈɲol kaɾiˈβeɲo], locally [ehpaˈɲol kaɾiˈβeɲo]) is the general name of the Spanish dialects spoken in the Caribbean region. The Spanish language was introduced to the Caribbean in 1492 with the voyages of Christopher Columbus. It resembles the Spanish spoken in the Canary Islands, and, more distantly, the Spanish of western Andalusia. With more than 25 million speakers, Spanish is the most widely spoken language in the Caribbean Islands.

More precisely, the term in its strictest sense however refers to the Spanish language as it is spoken on the Caribbean island nations of Cuba, the Dominican Republic, Antigua and Barbuda and Puerto Rico. In a much looser sense, it can also include Panama and the Caribbean coasts of Colombia and Venezuela; and on the widest application of the phrase, it includes the Caribbean coastal regions of Mexico, Guatemala, Belize, Honduras, Nicaragua, and Costa Rica.

== Phonology ==
- Seseo, where /θ/ and /s/ merge to /s/, as in the rest of the Americas, in the Canary Islands and in southern Spain.
- Yeísmo, where /ʎ/ and /ʝ/ merge to /ʝ/, as in many other Spanish dialects.
- /s/ is debuccalized to [h] at the end of syllables, as is common in the southern half of Spain, the Canaries and much of Spanish America: los amigos [lo(h) aˈmiɣo(h)] ('the friends'), dos [ˈdo(h)] ('two'). It may also be elided entirely. Syllable-final [s] is always or mostly pronounced in formal speech, like TV broadcasts.
- Syllable-initial /s/ is also sporadically debuccalized in unstressed syllables, although this process is documented only in certain areas, such as parts of Puerto Rico: cinco centavos [ˈsiŋkohenˈtaβo], la semana pasada [laheˈmanapaˈsaða].
- As a reaction to the stigmatization of s-debuccalization and elision, hypercorrections are frequent. For example, speakers may say catorces año for catorce años '14 years'. These hypercorrections are called hablar fisno 'speaking finely', with an extra, hypercorrect 's'.
- /x/ pronounced [h], as is common in Andalusia, the Canary Islands and various parts of South America.
- Occasional lenition of /tʃ/ to [ʃ] mucho [ˈmutʃo]→[ˈmuʃo], as in part of Andalusia or in Chile.
- Word-final /n/ is realized as a velar nasal [ŋ] (velarization). It can be elided, with backwards nasalization of the preceding vowel: [pan]→[pã]; as in part of Andalusia.
- Deletion of intervocalic and word final /d/, as in many Spanish dialects: cansado [kanˈsao] ('tired'), nada [ˈnaða]→[na] ('nothing'), and perdido [pelˈdi.o] ('lost'), mitad [miˈtað]→[miˈta]
- Syllable final 'r' has a variety of realisations:
  1. lambdacism /ɾ/→[l] porque [ˈpoɾke]→[ˈpolke]
  2. deletion of /ɾ/ hablar [aˈβlaɾ]→[aˈβla]
  3. assimilation to following consonant, causing gemination. carne [ˈkaɾne]→[ˈkanːe], verde [ˈbeɾðe]→[ˈbedːe]. Most notable of Spanish spoken in and around Havana.
  4. /ɹ/ is a common realization in the middle and upper classes in Puerto Rico under the influence of English.
  5. vocalization of /ɾ/ to /i/ hacer [aˈseɾ]→[aˈsej] in the Cibao region of the Dominican Republic.
  6. aspiration /ɾ/→[h] carne [ˈkaɾne]→[ˈkahne]
- /r/ is devoiced to [r̥] in the Dominican Republic and Puerto Rico: cotorra [koˈtora]→[koˈtor̥a] and realised as a uvular fricative [ʀ], [χ] (uvularization) in rural Puerto Rican dialects
- Several neutralizations also occur in the syllable coda. The liquids /l/ and /ɾ/ may neutralize to [j] (Cibaeño Dominican celda/cerda [ˈsejða] 'cell'/'bristle'), [l] (alma/arma [ˈalma] 'soul'/'weapon', comer [koˈme(l)] 'to eat'), or as complete regressive assimilation (pulga/purga [ˈpuɡːa] 'flea'/'purge'). The deletions and neutralizations (/ɾ/→/l/→/i/→∅) show variability in their occurrence, even with the same speaker in the same utterance, which implies that nondeleted forms exist in the underlying structure. That is not to say that these dialects are on the path to eliminating coda consonants since such processes have existed for more than four centuries in these dialects. Guitart (1997) argues that it is the result of speakers acquiring multiple phonological systems with uneven control, like that of second language learners.
- In Caribbean Spanish, there are geminated consonants when /l/ and /ɾ/ in syllabic coda are assimilated to the following consonant. Examples of Cuban Spanish:

/l/ or /ɾ/ + /f/	>	/d/ + /f/:	[ff]	a[ff]iler, hue[ff]ano	(Sp. ‘alfiler’, ‘huérfano’)
/l/ or /ɾ/ + /s/	>	/d/ + /s/:	[ds]	fa[ds]a), du[ds]e	(Sp. ‘falsa or farsa’, ‘dulce’)
/l/ or /ɾ/ + /h/	>	/d/ + /h/:	[ɦh]	ana[ɦh]ésico, vi[ɦh]en	(Sp. ‘analgésico’, ‘virgen’)
/l/ or /ɾ/ + /b/	>	/d/ + /b/:	[b˺b]	si[b˺b]a, cu[b˺b]a	(Sp. ‘silba or sirva’, ‘curva’)
/l/ or /ɾ/ + /d/	>	/d/ + /d/:	[d˺d]	ce[d˺d]a, acue[d˺d]o	(Sp. ‘celda or cerda’, ‘acuerdo’)
/l/ or /ɾ/ + /ɡ/	>	/d/ + /ɡ/:	[ɡ˺ɡ]	pu[ɡ˺ɡ]a, la[ɡ˺ɡ]a	(Sp. ‘pulga or purga’, ‘larga’)
/l/ or /ɾ/ + /p/	>	/d/ + /p/:	[b˺p]	cu[b˺p]a, cue[b˺p]o	(Sp. ‘culpa’, ‘cuerpo’)
/l/ or /ɾ/ + /t/	>	/d/ + /t/:	[d˺t]	sue[d˺t]e, co[d˺t]a	(Sp. ‘suelte o suerte’, ‘corta’)
/l/ or /ɾ/ + /tʃ/	>	/d/ + /tʃ/:	[d˺tʃ]	co[d˺tʃ]a, ma[d˺tʃ]arse	(Sp. ‘colcha o corcha’, ‘marcharse’)
/l/ or /ɾ/ + /k/	>	/d/ + /k/:	[ɡ˺k]	vo[ɡ˺k]ar, ba[ɡ˺k]o	(Sp. ‘volcar’, ‘barco’)
/l/ or /ɾ/ + /m/	>	/d/ + /m/:	[mm]	ca[mm]a, a[mm]a	(Sp. ‘calma’, ‘alma o arma’)
/l/ or /ɾ/ + /n/	>	/d/ + /n/:	[nn]	pie[nn]a, ba[nn]eario	(Sp. ‘pierna’, ‘balneario’)
/ɾ/ + /l/	>	/d/ + /l/:	[ll]	bu[ll]a, cha[ll]a	(Sp. ‘burla’, ‘charla’)
/l/ + /r/	>	/d/ + /r/:	[r]	a[r]ededor	(Sp. ‘alrededor’)

== Morphology ==
- As in all American variants of Spanish the third person plural pronoun ustedes has supplanted the pronoun vosotros/vosotras.
- Voseo is now completely absent from insular Caribbean Spanish. Contemporary commentators such as the Cuban Esteban Pichardo speak of its survival as late as the 1830s (see López Morales 1970:136‑142) but by the 1870s it appears to have become confined to a small number of speakers from the lowest social strata. In addition to most of Central America, voseo is used in the northwest of Venezuela (states of Falcón and Zulia), in the north of the Colombian department of Cesar, in the south of La Guajira department on Colombia's Atlantic coast, and in the Azuero Peninsula in Panama.
- The diminutive (ito, ita) takes the form (ico, ica) after /t/: pato becomes patico instead of patito and pregunta becomes preguntica instead of preguntita. However, perro still becomes perrito.
- Possibly as a result of the routine elision of word-final [s], some speakers may use [se] as a plural marker, but generally this tendency is limited to words with singular forms that end in a stressed vowel: [kaˈfe] café 'coffee' → [kaˈfese] 'coffees', [soˈfa] sofá 'sofa' → [soˈfase] 'sofas'.

== Vocabulary ==
- The second-person subject pronouns, tú (or vos in Central America) and usted, are used more frequently than in other varieties of Spanish, contrary to the general Spanish tendency to omit them when meaning is clear from the context (see pro-drop language). Thus, tú estás hablando instead of estás hablando. The tendency is strongest in the island countries and, on the mainland, in Nicaragua, where voseo (rather than the use of tú for the second person singular familiar) is predominant.
- So-called "wh-questions", which in standard Spanish are marked by subject/verb inversion, often appear without the inversion in Caribbean Spanish: "¿Qué tú quieres?" for standard "¿Qué quieres (tú)?" ("What do you want?").

== See also ==
- Andalusian Spanish
- Belizean Spanish
- Canarian Spanish
- Colombian Spanish
- Costa Rican Spanish
- Cuban Spanish
- Dominican Spanish
- Guatemalan Spanish
- Honduran Spanish
- Mexican Spanish
- Nicaraguan Spanish
- Panamanian Spanish
- Puerto Rican Spanish
- Trinidadian Spanish
- Venezuelan Spanish
  - Maracucho Spanish
- Languages of the Caribbean
- Isleño Spanish

== Bibliography ==
- Arias, Álvaro (2019). "Fonética y fonología de las consonantes geminadas en el español de Cuba". Moenia. 25: 465–497. 25, 465-497.
- Boyd-Bowman, Peter (1975), "A sample of Sixteenth Century 'Caribbean' Spanish Phonology.", in Milán, William G.; Staczek, John J.; Zamora, Juan C. (eds.), 1974 Colloquium on Spanish and Portuguese Linguistics, Washington, D.C.: Georgetown University Press, pp. 1–11
- Guitart, Jorge M. (1997), "Variability, multilectalism, and the organization of phonology in Caribbean Spanish dialects", in Martínez-Gil, Fernando; Morales-Front, Alfonso (eds.), Issues in the Phonology and Morphology of the Major Iberian Languages, Georgetown University Press, pp. 515–536
- Gutiérrez-Bravo, Rodrigo (2008), "Topicalization and Preverbal Subjects in Spanish wh-interrogatives", in Bruhn de Garavito, Joyce; Valenzuela, Elena (eds.), Selected Proceedings of the 10th Hispanic Linguistics Symposium, Somerville, MA: Cascadilla, pp. 225–236
- Labov, William (1994), Principles of Linguistic Change: Volume I: Internal Factors, Cambridge, MA: Blackwell Publishers
- Lipski, John M. (1977), "Preposed Subjects in Questions: Some Considerations", Hispania, 60 (1): 61–67, doi:10.2307/340393, JSTOR 340393
- Lipski, John M. (1993). On the Non-Creole Basis for Afro-Caribbean Spanish.
- Lipski, John M. (1997). "En busca de las normas fonéticas del español" (PDF). In Colombi, M. Cecilia; Alarconi, Francisco X. (eds.). La enseñanza del español a hispanohablantes : praxis y teoría (in Spanish). Boston: Houghton Mifflin. pp. 121–132. ISBN 9780669398441.
