= Assibilation =

Phonological sound change

In linguistics, assibilation is a sound change resulting in a sibilant consonant. It is a form of spirantization and is commonly the final phase of palatalization.

== Arabic ==
A characteristic of Mashreqi varieties of Arabic (particularly Levantine and Egyptian) is to assibilate the interdental consonants of Modern Standard Arabic (MSA) in certain contexts (defined more culturally than phonotactically). Thus, ṯāʾ, pronounced [θ] in MSA, becomes [s] (as MSA /θaqaːfah/ → Levantine /saqaːfeh/ "culture"); ḏāl, pronounced [ð] in MSA, becomes [z] (as MSA /ðanb/ → Levantine /zamb/ "guilt"); and ẓāʾ, pronounced [ðˤ] in MSA, becomes [zˤ] (as MSA /maħðˤuːðˤ/ → Levantine /maħzˤuːzˤ/ "lucky").

Diachronically, the phoneme represented by the letter ǧīm has, in some dialects, experienced assibilation as well. The pronunciation in Classical Arabic is reconstructed to have been [ɡʲ] or [ɟ] (or perhaps both dialectically); it is cognate to [ɡ] in most other Semitic languages, and it is understood to be derived from that sound in Proto-Semitic. It has experienced extensive change in pronunciation over the centuries and is pronounced at least six different ways across the assorted varieties of Arabic. A common one is [ʒ], the result of a process of palatalization starting with Proto-West Semitic [ɡ], then [ɡʲ] or [ɟ], then [d͡ʒ] (a pronunciation still current) and finally [ʒ] (in Levantine and non-Algerian Maghrebi). The last pronunciation is considered acceptable for use in MSA, along with [ɡ] and [d͡ʒ].

== Bantu languages ==
In the history of several Bantu groups, including the Southern Bantu languages, the Proto-Bantu consonant *k was palatalised before a close or near-close vowel. Thus, the class 7 noun prefix *kɪ̀- appears in e.g. Zulu as isi-, Sotho as se-, Venda as tshi- and Shona as chi-.

== Finnic languages ==
Finnic languages (Finnish, Estonian and their closest relatives) had *ti changed to /si/. The alternation can be seen in dialectal and inflected word forms: Finnish kieltää "to deny" → kielti ~ kielsi "s/he denied"; vesi "water" vs. vete-nä "as water".

An intermediate stage /ts/ is preserved in South Estonian in certain cases: tsiga "pig", vs. Finnish sika, Standard (North) Estonian siga.

== Germanic languages ==
In the High German consonant shift, voiceless stops /p, t, k/ spirantized to /f, s, x/ at the end of a syllable. The shift of /t/ to /s/ (as in English water, German Wasser) is assibilation.

Assibilation occurs without palatalization for some speakers of African American Vernacular English in which /θ/ is alveolarized to /s/ when it occurs at the end of a syllable and within a word before another consonant, leading to such pronunciations as the following:

bathroom	/ˈbæs.ruːm/
birthday	/ˈbɝs.deɪ/

The slang zaddy in African-American Vernacular English popularized to American English by Ty Dolla Sign's eponymous song may have been formed by analysis of an assibilated /d/ phoneme preceding /æ/ in the first syllable of daddy by the subject girl in question who "wanna come to Cali / brown skin, from Miami".

== Greek ==
In Proto-Greek, the earlier combinations *ty, *t^{h}y and *dy assibilated to become alveolar affricates, *ts and *dz, in what is called the first palatalization. Later, a second round of palatalization occurred and initially produced geminate palatal *ťť and *ďď from various consonants, followed by *y. The former was depalatalised to plain geminate tt in some dialects and was assibilated to ss in others. The latter evolved into an affricate dz in all Greek dialects:

- *tot-yos -> PG *totsos > Homeric tóssos > Attic tósos "this much" (Latin tot)
- *medʰ-yos > PG *metsos > Homeric méssos > Attic mésos "middle" (Latin medius)

Some Greek dialects later underwent yet another round of assibilation. *ti shifted to /si/ finally in Attic and Ionic but not in Doric.

- Doric títhēti – Attic-Ionic títhēsi "he/she places"

== Romance languages ==
The word "assibilation" itself contains an example of the phenomenon, as it is pronounced /əˌsɪbɪˈleɪʃən/. The Classical Latin -tio was pronounced /tioː/ (for example, assibilatio was pronounced /asːiːbilaːtioː/ and attentio /atːentioː/). However, in Vulgar Latin, it assibilated to /tsioː/, which can still be seen in Italian: attenzione.

In French, lenition then gave /sj/ (like attention modern /a.tɑ̃.sjɔ̃/)., which was further palatalized in the English derived words to /ʃ/ (like attention /əˈtɛn.ʃən/).

Most dialects of Quebec French apply a more recent assibilation to all dental plosive consonants immediately before high front vowels and associated semivowels, so that the sequences /di dj dy dɥ ti tj ty tɥ/ become pronounced /dzi dzj dzy dzɥ tsi tsj tsy tsɥ/ respectively.

Assibilation can occur in some varieties of Spanish such as in Ecuador and Mexico. It is closely related to the phonetic term sibilation.

== Slavic languages ==
Palatalization effects were widespread in the history of Proto-Slavic. In the first palatalization, various consonants were converted into postalveolar fricatives and affricates, while in the second and third palatalizations, the results were alveolar.

Some Slavic languages underwent yet another round of palatalisation. In Polish, in particular, dental consonants became alveolo-palatal fricatives and affricates when followed by a front vowel.

== Reverse process ==
In Gorontalo, the reverse of assibilation occurred, when the instances of *s became t (*siku → ti'u "elbow"). However, its sister language Mongondow still partially retains it (siku).

== See also ==
- Assimilation (linguistics)
