= North American Spanish =

North-American Spanish (Spanish: español norteamericano) is the name of the Spanish dialects spoken in North America, and includes:

- Caribbean Spanish
- Central American Spanish
  - List of colloquial expressions in Honduras
- Mexican Spanish
- United States Spanish
  - Californian Spanish
  - Isleño Spanish
  - New Mexican Spanish
  - Puerto Rican Spanish
