= Canarian Spanish =

Dialect of Spanish in the Canary Islands

- español canario
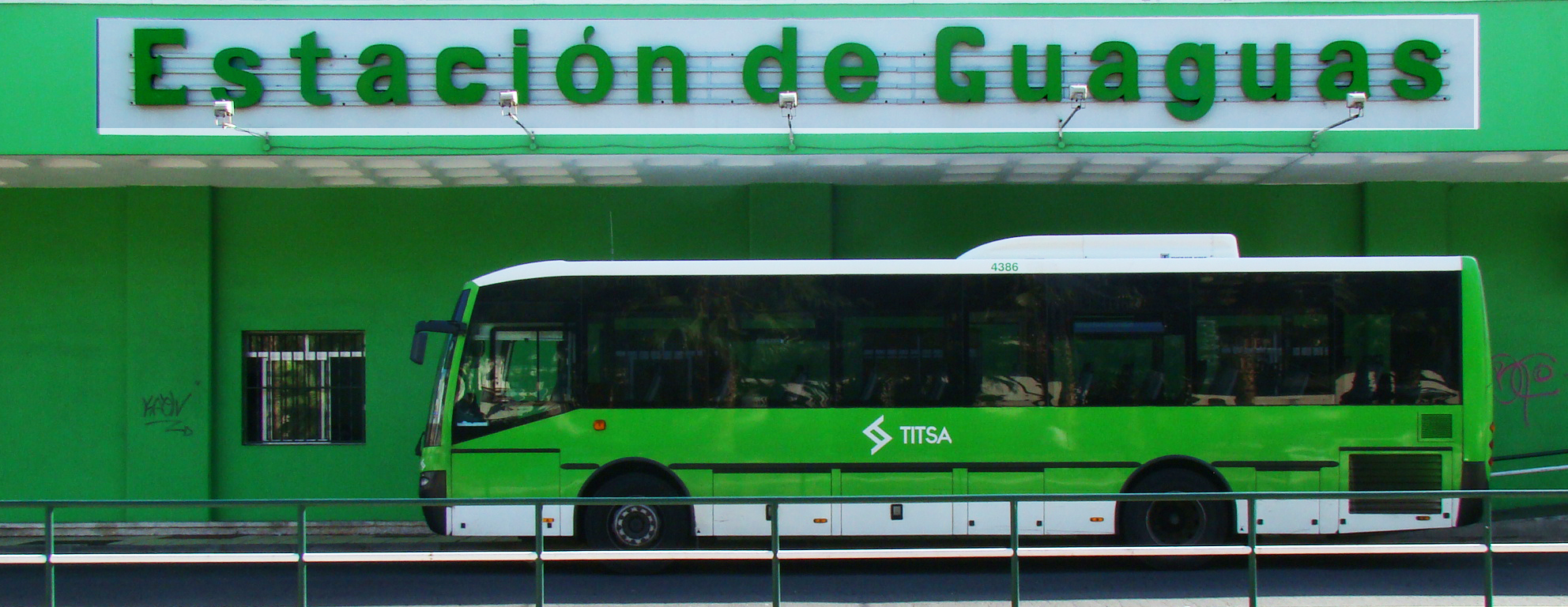
- Estación de guaguas ("Bus station") at Puerto de la Cruz, Tenerife
- Pronunciation: [espaˈɲol kaˈnaɾjo]
- Native to: Spain
- Region: Canary Islands
- Ethnicity: Canary Islanders, Isleños
- Native speakers: (undated figure of 2 million)
- Language family: Indo-European: Italic; Latino-Faliscan; Romance; Italo-Western; Western Romance; Ibero-Romance; West Iberian; Castilian; Spanish; Peninsular Spanish; Canarian Spanish
- Dialects: Isleño; Silbo Gomero
- Writing system: Latin (Spanish alphabet)

Official status
- Regulated by: Real Academia Española; Academia Canaria de la Lengua

Language codes
- ISO 639-3: –
- Glottolog: cana1269
- Linguasphere: 51-AAA-be
- IETF: es-IC
- Map of the Canary Islands, where Canarian Spanish is spoken

Canarian Spanish or Canary Island Spanish (Spanish terms in descending order of frequency: español de Canarias, español canario, habla canaria, or dialecto canario) is the variety of the Spanish language as spoken in the Canary Islands by the Canary Islanders.

Canarian Spanish heavily influenced the development of Caribbean Spanish and other Latin American Spanish vernaculars because Hispanic America was originally largely settled by colonists from the Canary Islands and Andalusia; those dialects, including the standard language, were already quite close to Canarian and Andalusian speech. In the Caribbean, Canarian speech patterns were never regarded as either foreign or very different from the local accent.

The incorporation of the Canary Islands into the Crown of Castile began with Henry III (1402) and was completed under the Catholic Monarchs. The expeditions for their conquest started off mainly from ports of Andalusia, which is why the Andalusians predominated in the Canaries. There was also an important colonising contingent from Portugal in the early conquest of the Canaries, along with the Andalusians and the Castilians from mainland Spain. In earlier times, Portuguese settled alongside the Spanish in the north of Gran Canaria, but they were assimilated by the Spanish. The population that inhabited the islands before the conquest, the Guanches, spoke a variety of Berber (also called Amazigh) dialects. After the conquest, the indigenous Guanche language was rapidly and almost completely eradicated in the archipelago. Only some names of plants and animals, terms related to cattle ranching and numerous island placenames survive.

Their geography made the Canary Islands receive much outside influence, with drastic cultural and linguistic changes. As a result of heavy Canarian emigration to the Caribbean, particularly during colonial times, Caribbean Spanish is strikingly similar to Canarian Spanish.

== Grammar ==
- As with most other varieties of Spanish outside Mainland Spain, the preterite is generally used instead of the perfect: hoy visité a Juan ("today I visited Juan") for hoy he visitado a Juan ("today I have visited Juan").
- Like most other varieties of Spanish outside central and northern Spain, ustedes is used for all second-person plurals: ustedes están is used for vosotros estáis. Other usages include also the use of the third-person plural pronouns su and sus to refer the second-person instead of vuestro and vuestros as in Latin American Spanish, and thus, the use of third-person plural verb conjugations. Example : ¿Ustedes recuerdan dónde quedaba su casa? (Do you remember where your house was?) for Canarian Spanish while being ¿Vosotros recordáis dónde quedaba vuestra casa? for Iberian Spanish.
- Speakers in the Canary Islands typically use third-person object pronouns in the same way as speakers from Andalusia and the Americas; that is, without leísmo, using the older, case-determined system of reference.
- Diminutive forms are typically shorter than in Peninsular Spanish, though the peninsular forms are used as a result of influence from the mainland: bailito for bailecito 'little dance' and pueblito for pueblecito 'little town'.

== Pronunciation ==
Sample of Canarian Spanish pronunciation

- Seseo, the lack of distinction between the pronunciation of the letters ⟨s⟩ and ⟨z⟩ or "soft" ⟨c⟩, is the most distinctive non-mainland characteristic; caza ('hunt') is pronounced exactly like casa ('house'), which occurs in some parts of Andalusia as well. The feature is common to most parts of the Spanish-speaking world outside of the northern three quarters of Mainland Spain (Castile and the surrounding provinces have adopted the feature).
- /s/ is debuccalized to [h] at the end of syllables, as is common in Andalusia, Extremadura, Murcia, the Caribbean, and much of lowland Latin America. This results in a phonetic merger with /x/. The frequency of s-aspiration has generally increased over the last few decades, as part of the formation of new regional norms. Syllable-final [s] is always or mostly pronounced in formal speech, like TV broadcasts.
- /x/ (spelled as ⟨j⟩ or, before ⟨e⟩ or ⟨i⟩, as ⟨g⟩) is usually aspirated (pronounced [h]), as is common in Andalusia (especially in its west) as well as the Caribbean and some other parts of Latin America.
- The same [h] sound is used in colloquial speech for the sound historically derived from Latin f-. It is also preserved, chiefly among rural speakers, in many parts of Peninsular Spain and Latin America.
- Word-final /n/ is realized as a velar nasal [ŋ].
- Yeísmo has become almost universal throughout the archipelago. Currently the palatal lateral approximant /ʎ/ formerly represented by ⟨ll⟩ has been relegated to the speech of the most elderly, generally with low education and living in rural zones.
- The stops /p, t, tʃ, k/ can all become voiced when between vowels, whether between words as in la pata [la ˈbata] or within a word as in deporte [deˈboɾte]. This does not cause a merger with Spanish's voiced stops, since those are pronounced as approximants when between vowels. In addition, a weakened final -/s/ can block this voicing, leading to alternations like la pata [la ˈbata] and las patas [la ˈpata].
- /tʃ/, the phoneme represented by ⟨ch⟩, is traditionally pronounced as voiceless palatal plosive rather than an affricate. The plosive pronunciation is still widespread.

== Vocabulary ==
Comparison between peninsular, Canarian and Latin American Spanish dialects
Spanish			English
Peninsular	Canarian	Latin American	English
vale		bien, dale, ya	okay
anteojos, gafas		espejuelos, anteojos, lentes	glasses
patata	papa		potato
Bizcochón, bizcocho, tarta, pastel	queque	bizcocho, ponqué, queque, pastel, torta	cake
palomitas	cotufas, roscas	pochoclos, crispetas, palomitas, cotufas, cabritas, canguil, canchita	popcorn
judía, alubia	judía, habichuela	frijol, frejol, caraota, habichuela, poroto	bean
cacahuete	maníz	maní, cacahuate	peanut
coche		auto, carro	car
conducir		conducir, guiar, manejar	to drive
habitación, alcoba, dormitorio, cuarto	cuarto	pieza, cuarto, habitación	bedroom
autobús	guagua	colectivo, buseta, autobús, guagua, buses	bus
aparcar		estacionar, parquear	to park
zumo	jugo		juice
guay, chulo		chévere, chido, piola, copado, bacán, bacano	cool
vosotros	ustedes		you (informal plural)

Canarian vocabulary has its own regionalisms different from standard Castilian Spanish vocabulary. For example, guagua ("bus") differs from standard Spanish autobús. The word guagua is an onomatopoeia stemming from the sound of a Klaxon horn ("wawa"). An example of Canarian usage for a Spanish word is the verb fajarse ("to fight"). In standard Castilian Spanish, the verb would be pelearse, while fajar exists as a non-reflexive verb related to the hemming of a skirt. The term of endearment socio is a very popular Canarian term.

The Canarian vocabulary has a notable influence from the Guanche language, especially in the toponymy. In addition, many Canarian personal names come from the Guanche language, such as Gara, Acerina, Aydan, Beneharo, Jonay, Tanausú, Chaxiraxi, Ayoze, Yaiza and Zebenzuí.

As Canarian Spanish was influenced by Andalusian Spanish, a few words of Andalusi Arabic origin are found, and there are some doublets of Arabic-Latinate synonyms with the Arabic form being more common in Canarian, such as cuarto or alcoba for standard habitación or dormitorio ("bedroom"), alhaja for standard joya ("jewel"), or alacrán for standard escorpión ("scorpion"); Arabic influence in Canarian Spanish was also brought by returning Canarian settlers and their children from Spanish Sahara after its independence. Other examples include guayete ("child") or jaique ("poorly made and loosely fitting dress"). There are also numerous words of Arabic origin to designate different plants (aciba, ahulaga, albohol, alcatripa, algafita, algahuero, almácigo, alpispillo, almulei, bahaza, orijama, tarahal, aliacán...). These words may have come directly from North Africa, favored by the presence of many common plants, or they may have naturalized first in the peninsula and then come to the Canary Islands (this seems to be the case of the words ahulaga and tarahal), so they are also rooted in peninsular Castilian Spanish.

=== Loanwords from other languages ===
These, due to their origin and nature, can be classified into three large groups, depending on whether they come from current Spanish and its dialects, from old Castilian or if, finally, they come from languages other than Spanish. Thus, the words "formed" in the Canary Islands from other words of the Spanish language, the close influence of Portuguese, or the many terms that came to the Canary Islands from dialectal variants such as Latin American Spanish, the result of the historical links between both shores of the Atlantic. Thus, the Canarian lexicon is the reflection of centuries of island history, cultural miscegenation and adaptation of the language to the unique conditions that existed on the islands.

==== Canarismos from Spanish and its dialects ====
The Canarian voices that come from the Hispanic language itself or from its dialects are framed here. In this group, it would be necessary to distinguish between canarisms originating from some dialect of Spanish and those that derive from a pan- Hispanic voice, but which in the Canary Islands have undergone some linguistic process (derivation, simplification, formal change, metonymic displacement, etc.), giving rise to a new or modified voice. Thus, the word «allege» means in Castilian to adduce merits to substantiate some request, while in the Canary Islands it is used as a synonym for conversing . There are also canarisms formed by derivation of words from general Spanish, such as "bizcochón" (cylindrical cake made from eggs, flour and sugar), or "fragilón" (stupid, presumptuous, vain), which come from the Pan-Hispanic terms "biscuit" and "fragile", respectively, to which they have been added in the Canary Islands the suffix "-on".

==== Canarismos from old Castilian ====
On the other hand, among the canarismos coming from dialectal forms of Castilian, the following stand out:

- Terms of Latin American origin: They come mainly from the Caribbean area (Cuba, Puerto Rico, Dominican Republic) and were introduced in the Canary Islands as a result of the emigration link that for centuries united the islands with America. They are terms linked to any area of traditional island culture and are more deeply rooted in the western islands than in the eastern ones, due to their more continuous link with the New World. Examples of this are the words:
  - guagua (bus)
  - fotingo (jalopy/dilapidated car)

In other words, its origin is indeterminate, possibly engineered on the spot. For example, pollaboba, is a special case, because it went from being an insult (with a pejorative meaning similar to impotent or celibate ) to even being used in common speech, sometimes losing the initial meaning.

==== Canarismos from other languages ====
- Terms of Andalusian origin: It is a group of voices introduced by the Andalusians from the beginning of the repopulation of the archipelago. Examples of Andalusianisms in Canarian speech are:
  - "embelesar" ( to fall asleep )
  - "bocinegro" ( kind of pagel )
  - "chocho" ( Lupinus albus )
- Terms of Portuguese origin: Portuguese is the foreign language that has given the most voices to the Spanish spoken in the Canary Islands, due to the huge mass of Portuguese who settled on the islands during the 15th, 16th and 17th centuries. It is a large number of words from all grammatical categories and linked to most spheres of life,
  - Linked to agriculture ("millo", corn; "batata", sweet potato; "apañar batatas", from the Portuguese apanhar, pick potatoes) and livestock (terms such as "bosta", cattle excrement ).
  - To the sea and fishing : as «cambullón», buying, selling and exchanging on board ships, from cambulhão, 'set of things, string'; "margullar" swim underwater or “burgao” small sea snail, “engodar” attract fish by baiting them, “cardume” small school of fish, “pardela" shearwater/sea bird, "liña" string used for fishing and the ichthyonyms "caboso", "bicuda" and "quelme". Also "furnia" from the Portuguese furna, sea cave.
  - In the home environment, words like «gaveta», sliding furniture drawer; "fechar", to close in Portuguese; "fechillo", latch; "fechadura", lock, "fonil" (funnel), funil in Portuguese; "traza" (moth), traça in Portuguese; “trancar”, lock in the peninsular Spanish.
  - In the personal sphere, words such as “petudo”, from the Portuguese peitudo (big-chested), but which in the Canary Islands takes the meaning of hunchback; "jeito", movement, skill; "long", meaning wide or loose; "cañoto", from the Portuguese canhoto, left-handed.
  - Numerous trees and plants in the laurel forest have obvious Portuguese roots in their names: viñátigo, acebiño, faya, sanguino, follodo, aderno, coderno, malfurada, gibalbera, til or tilo, norza, pampillo, sao ... This is due to that the laurel forest of the Canary Islands and that of Madeira, they share many species, and many others have great similarities. Sometimes we can find that a word that in Portuguese describes a plant in the Canary Islands describes another similar or from the same family. A particular case is that of the word parrot, which is used in the Canary Islands to designate the laurel ( Laurus azorica ) but which in Portuguese refers to Prunus lusitanica, which also exists in the Canary Islands and is known as daughter.
  - Also taken from the Portuguese are the suffix -ero in the name of the plants, instead of the Castilian -o (naranjero instead of naranjo [orange tree], almendrero instead of almendro [almond tree], castañero instead of castaño [chestnut tree], manzanero instead of manzano [apple tree]) and the suffix -ento, which gives the meaning of "in abundance" (for example, "aguachento" is used to say that a fruit has lost its flavor due to having an excess of water, or that a stew has a consistency that is too soupy).
  - The substitution of the preposition towards by para: (Voy para allá (I'm going there))
  - The substitution of prepositional phrases by adverbs of place ("arriba" instead of "encima" (above), "atrás" instead of detrás (behind)).
  - Pronunciation of the words padre (father) and madre (mother) closer to the Portuguese pai and mãe respectively.
  - Other words and expressions: “rente” (flush), “de cangallas” (legs up), “escarrancharse” (spreading your legs excessively), atillo (string), “pegar a” (start to), “en peso” (in its entirety or together), “magua” (longing), "amularse" (get angry), “jeitoso” (skillful), “agonia” (nausea), “arrullar” (rock), “fañoso” (that speaks with nasal resonance due to some transient respiratory disease), "picar el ojo" (winking).
- Terms of English origin: These are surely the most recently incorporated voices from other languages into Canarian speech, the result of commercial links with England and the establishment of British merchants on the islands, especially in the 18th, 19th and 20th centuries. And one of the most discussed about its origin.
  - Terms such as "queque" ( sweet made in the oven based on eggs, sugar, raisins and other ingredients, from English cake ), "quinegua" ( type of potato, from English King Edward ) or "naife" ( name of the typical Canarian knife used in banana cultivation, comes from the English word knife ), "pulover" ( jersey, comes from pull over ), "suéter" (comes from sweater).
  - Brand terms such as "flis" (from the trademark Flit, to refer to an aerosol or spray), "flash" ( pole wrapped in plastic, comes from flash which was its trademark ).
  - Terms like “chercha/e” ( messy, dirty place, pigsty ). Its origin is located in the English word "church" and in reference to the cemetery where non-Catholics were buried.
  - And others not only typical in the Canary Islands such as "tenis" (from the English "tennis shoes" for sports shoes, any kind of shoes), “ticket” or “parking” (words added before general Spanish).
- Terms of French origin: Of the French spoken by the first Norman conquerors, a small number of words have been preserved, with a rather testimonial value. Examples of this are the terms:
  - "malpaís" ( unproductive land, in the Canary Islands used to designate lava fields, seems to come from the Old French male pays )
  - "cardón" ( type of autochthonous plant, which could come from the French chardon, plant with thorns )
  - "wadding" ( cotton sheet, comes from ouate )
  - "creyón" ( colored pencil, comes from crayon ).
  - Although currently in disuse, on the island of El Hierro it is customary to say "o" ( où, in French) for "dónde está", "¿o las llaves?" instead of "¿dónde están las llaves?" (Where are the keys?)
- Terms of Catalan origin:
  - "alfábega" (it is an Arabism that is only preserved in Catalonia and the Canary Islands, where the Castilian basil is also used, which is also of Arab origin)
  - "seba" (in Catalan it means onion, but in the Canary Islands it is used to designate the marine plant whose leaves are reminiscent of these)
  - "lletera" (derived from the Catalan llet which means milk, and is used to name some species of the genus Euphorbia . This voice is also found in Valencian speech )
  - "tonina" (Tuna Thunnus thynnus is named like this and sometimes also to dolphins, it has given rise to the expression "Being fat like a tonina")
  - "bufo" (fart, in Catalan it is used in feminine) .
- Terms of Guanche origin:
  - "ajinajo" (Echium aculeatum, a plant in the borage family)
  - "amagante" (Cistus symphytifolius, a plant in the rockrose family)
  - "mol" (Artemisia thuscula, a plant in the aster family)
  - "perenquén" (gecko)
  - "sarantontón" (ladybug)
  - "tagasaste" (Chamaecytisus proliferus, a shrub of the legume family)

=== Similarities in languages ===
The chart shows the similarities and differences in the dialects of Canarian Spanish, Andalusian Spanish, Castilian Spanish, and Caribbean Spanish.

	Canarian (Note: Canarian words are sometimes used interchangebly with Castilian words.)	Andalusian (Note: Andalusian words are sometimes used interchangebly with Castilian words.)	Castilian	Dominican	Puerto Rican	Cuban	Colombian	Venezuelan	Panamanian
banana	plátano	plátano	plátano	guineo	guineo	plátano	banano	cambur	guineo
bean	judía	habichuela	judía	habichuela	habichuela	frijol	frijol	caraota	frijol
clothes hanger	percha	percha	percha	percha	gancho	perchero	gancho	gancho	gancho
green bean	habichuela	judía verde	judía verde	vainita	habichuela tierna	habichuela	habichuela	vainita	habichuela
papaya	papaya	papaya	papaya	lechosa	papaya/ lechosa	fruta bomba	papaya	lechosa	papaya
passion fruit	parchita	maracuyá	maracuyá	chinola	parcha	maracuyá	maracuyá	parchita	maracuyá
peanut	manís	cacahuete	cacahuete	maní	maní	maní	maní	maní	maní
popcorn	cotufas/ roscas	palomitas	palomitas	palomitas de maíz	popcorn	rositas de maíz	crispetas/ maíz pira	cotufas	popcorn
postage stamp	sello	sello	sello	sello	sello	sello	estampilla	estampilla	estampilla
potato	papa	papa	patata	papa	papa	papa	papa	papa	papa
soft drink	refresco	refresco	refresco	refresco	refresco	refresco	gaseosa	refresco	soda
sweet potato	batata	batata	boniato	batata	batata	boniato	batata	batata	camote
transit bus	guagua	autobús	autobús	guagua	guagua	guagua	autobús	autobús	autobús
watermelon	sandía	sandía	sandía	sandía	melón de agua	melón de agua	sandía	patilla	sandía

=== Canarian loans in other languages ===
The word caldera/caldero means "cooking pot" in Spanish (compare "cauldron"). In the Canary Islands, it was also applied to several volcanic places. The term caldera was introduced into the geological vocabulary by the German geologist Leopold von Buch when he published his memoirs of his 1815 visit to the Canary Islands, (Note: Leopold von Buch's book Physical Description of the Canary Isles was published in 1825) where he first saw the Las Cañadas caldera on Tenerife, with Mount Teide dominating the landscape, and then the Caldera de Taburiente on La Palma.

== See also ==
- Nationalisms and regionalisms of Spain
- Silbo gomero – Whistled language
- Isleño Spanish

== Bibliography ==
- Herrera Santana, Juana (2007). "Variación dialectal: procesos de convergencia y divergencia en el español de Canarias". Revista de Filología de la Universidad de la Laguna (in Spanish) (25): 337–346. ISSN 0212-4130.
- Navarro Carrasco, Ana Isabel (2003), El atlas de Canarias y el diccionario académico, Publicaciones Universidad de Alicante, ISBN 978-8479082864
- Penny, Ralph J. (2000). Variation and change in Spanish. Cambridge: Cambridge University Press. doi:10.1017/CBO9781139164566. ISBN 0521780454.
