= Early Modern Spanish =

Variety of Spanish used in the sixteenth and seventeenth centuries

- Early Modern Castilian
- español; castellano
- Pronunciation: [espaˈɲol] [kasteˈʎano] (Note: In yeísmo dialects, castellano is pronounced [kasteˈʝano].)
- Native to: Spain
- Region: Iberian Peninsula
- Ethnicity: Spaniards
- Era: 15th–17th century
- Language family: Indo-European: Italic; Latino-Faliscan; Latin; Romance; Italo-Western; Western Romance; Ibero-Romance; West Iberian; Castilian; Early Modern Spanish
- Early forms: Proto-Indo-European: Proto-Italic; Old Latin; Vulgar Latin; Proto-Romance; Old Spanish
- Writing system: Latin; Aljamía (marginal)

Language codes
- ISO 639-3: –
- Glottolog: stan1288

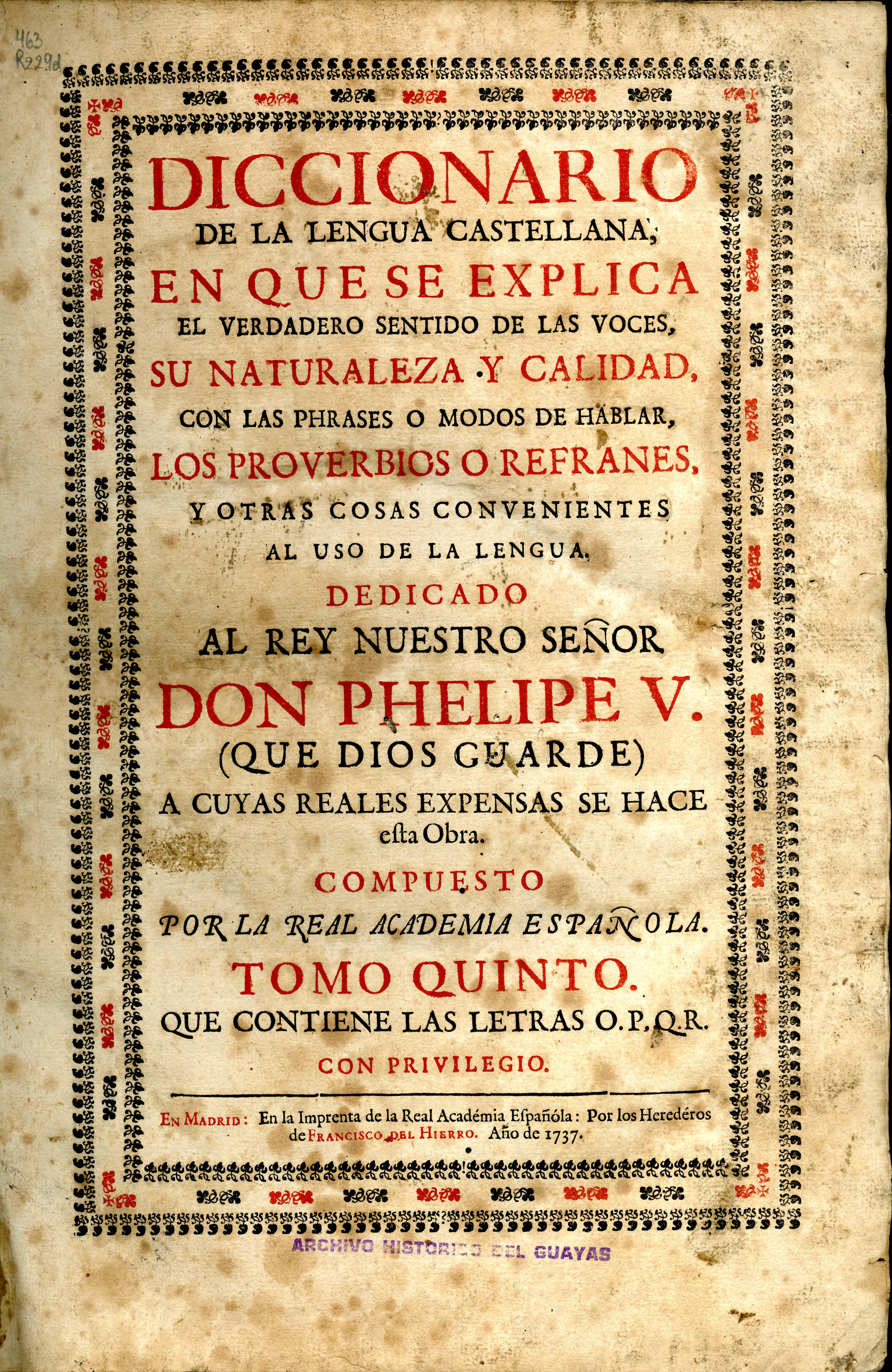
Cover of an Early Modern Spanish Dictionary made by the Printing House of Francisco del Hierro, Printer to the Royal Spanish Academy in 1737.

Early Modern Spanish (also called Classical Spanish or Golden Age Spanish, especially in literary contexts) is the variant of Spanish used between the end of the 15th century and the end of the 17th century, marked by a series of phonological and grammatical changes that transformed Old Spanish into Modern Spanish.

Notable changes from Old Spanish to Early Modern Spanish include: (1) a readjustment of the sibilants (including their devoicing and changes in their place of articulation, wherein voicing remains before voiced consonants, such as mismo, desde, and rasgo, but only allophonically), (2) the phonemic merger known as yeísmo, (3) the rise of new second-person pronouns, (4) the emergence of the "se lo" construction for the sequence of third-person indirect and direct object pronouns, and (5) new restrictions on the order of clitic pronouns.

Early Modern Spanish corresponds to the period of Spanish colonization of the Americas, and thus it forms the historical basis of all varieties of New World Spanish. Meanwhile, Judaeo-Spanish preserves some archaisms of Old Spanish that disappeared from the rest of the variants, such as the presence of voiced sibilants and the maintenance of the phonemes /ʃ/ and /ʒ/.

Early Modern Spanish, however, was not uniform throughout the Spanish-speaking regions of Spain. Each change has its own chronology and, in some cases, geography. Slightly different pronunciations existed simultaneously. The Spanish spoken in Toledo was taken as the "best" variety and was different from that of Madrid.

== Phonology ==
From the late 16th century to the mid-17th century, the voiced sibilants /z/, /z̺/, /ʒ/ lost their voicing and merged with their respective voiceless counterparts: laminal /s/, apical /s̺/, and palatal /ʃ/, resulting in the phonemic inventory shown below:

Consonants in Northern Spain
		Labial	Alveolar		Palatal	Velar	Glottal
		Labial	Laminal	Apical	Palatal	Velar	Glottal
Obstruent	Voiceless	p	t		t͡ʃ	k	
Obstruent	Voiced	b	d			g	
Voiceless fricative		f	s̻	s̺	ʃ		(h)
Nasal		m		n	ɲ		
Tap				ɾ			
Trill				r			
Approximant	Median				ʝ		
Approximant	Lateral			l	ʎ		

Consonants in Southern Spain
		Labial	Alveolar	Palatal	Velar	Glottal
Obstruent	Voiceless	p	t	t͡ʃ	k	
Obstruent	Voiced	b	d		g	
Fricative	Voiceless	f	s̻	ʃ		(h)
Fricative	Voiced		z̻	ʒ		
Nasal		m	n	ɲ		
Tap			ɾ			
Trill			r			
Approximant	Median			ʝ		
Approximant	Lateral		l	ʎ		

- The phoneme /h/ (from Old Spanish initial /f/) progressively became silent in most areas, though it still exists for some words in varieties of Andalusia and Extremadura. In several modern dialects, the sound [h] is the realization of the phoneme /x/; additionally, in many dialects it exists as a result of the debuccalization of /s/ in syllabic coda (a process commonly termed aspiration in Hispanic linguistics).
- In the Americas, the Canary Islands, and almost all of Andalusia, the apical /s̺/ merged with laminal /s/ (the resulting phoneme is represented as /s/). In central and northern Spain, /s/ shifted to /θ/, and the apicoalveolar sibilant /s̺/ was preserved without change and so it can be represented phonemically as /s/). Some authors use the transcription /s̪/ and /s̻/ for /s/ or /s̠/ for /s̺/ (or both).
- Many dialects have lost the distinction between the phonemes /ʎ/ and /ʝ/ in a merger, called yeísmo. Both phonemes have remained separate in parts of the Iberian Peninsula and in parts of South America, mainly in Bolivia, Paraguay, and Peru.

== Grammar ==
- A readjustment of the second-person pronouns differentiates Modern Spanish from Old Spanish. To eliminate the ambiguity of the form vos, which served for both the second-person singular formal and the second-person plural, two alternative forms were created:
  - The form usted (< vuesarced < vuestra merced, 'your grace') as a form of respect in the second-person singular.
  - The form vosotros (< vos otros, "you others") as a usual form of second-person plural. In parts of Andalusia, in the Canary Islands, and in the Americas, however, the form did not take hold, and the form ustedes came to be used for both the formal and the informal second-person plural.
- The loss of the phoneme /ʒ/—through a merger with /ʃ/—caused the medieval forms gelo, gela, gelos, gelas (consisting of an indirect object followed by a direct object) to be reinterpreted as se lo, se la, se los, se las, as in digelo 'I gave it to him/her' > Early Modern Spanish díselo > Modern Spanish se lo di.
- In Early Modern Spanish, clitic pronouns were still often suffixed to a finite verb form, as in Portuguese, but they began to alternate with preverbal forms, which became the norm in Modern Spanish: enfermose and muriose > se enfermó ("he/she/it got ill") and se murió ("he/she/it died").

== Spelling ==
Spelling in Early Modern Spanish was anarchic, unlike the Spanish of today, which is governed and standardized by the Real Academia Española, a semi-governmental body. There was no reference book or other authority writers or compositors could turn to, to find the "correct" spelling of a word. In fact, spelling was not considered very important. Sometimes words were spelled according to their Latin origin, rather than their actual pronunciation (trasumpto instead of trasunto). That presents a challenge to modern editors of texts from the period, who are forced to choose what spelling(s) to use. The radical proposals of Gonzalo Correas were not adopted.

== Sources ==
- Eberhard, David M.; Simons, Gary F.; Fennig, Charles D. (2020). Ethnologue: Languages of the World (23rd ed.). Dallas, Texas: SIL International. Archived from the original on 6 April 2006.
