= Voseo =

Use in Spanish of the pronoun 'vos' for the second-person familiar singular

In Spanish grammar, voseo (pronounced [boˈseo]) is the use of vos as a second-person singular pronoun, along with its associated verbal forms, in certain regions where the language is spoken. In most of those regions it replaces tuteo, i.e. the use of the pronoun tú and its verbal forms. Voseo can also be found in the context of using verb conjugations for vos with tú as the subject pronoun (verbal voseo).

In all regions with voseo, the corresponding unstressed object pronoun is te and the corresponding possessive is tu/tuyo.

Vos is used extensively as the second-person singular in Rioplatense Spanish (Argentina and Uruguay), Paraguayan Spanish, Eastern Bolivia, Chilean Spanish, and much of Central America (El Salvador, Guatemala, Honduras, Nicaragua); in Mexico, in the southern regions of Chiapas and parts of Oaxaca. It is rarely used, if at all, in places such as Cuba and Puerto Rico.

In the Rioplatense dialect, the usage of vos is prevalent, even in mainstream film, media and music. In Argentina, particularly from the second half of the 20th century, it has become very common to see billboards and other advertising campaigns using voseo.

Vos is present in some regions of other countries, for instance in the Maracucho Spanish of Zulia State, Venezuela (see Venezuelan Spanish), the Azuero Peninsula of Panama, in a few departments in Colombia, and in parts of Ecuador (Sierra down to Esmeraldas). In Peru, voseo is present in certain Andean regions and Cajamarca, but the younger generations have ceased to use it. It is also present in Judaeo-Spanish, spoken by Sephardic Jews, where it is the archaic plural form that vosotros replaced.

Voseo is seldom taught to students of Spanish as a second language, and its precise usage varies across different regions. Nevertheless, in recent years, it has become more commonly accepted across the Hispanophone world as a valid part of regional dialects.

== Attitudes ==
In some countries, the pronoun vos is used with family and friends (T-form), like tú in other varieties of Spanish, and contrasts with the respectful usted (V-form used with third person) which is used with strangers, elderly, and people of higher socioeconomic status; appropriate usage varies by dialect. In Central America, vos can be used among those considered equals, while usted maintains its respectful usage. In Ladino, the pronoun usted is completely absent, so the use of vos with strangers and elders is the standard.

Voseo was long considered a backward or uneducated usage by prescriptivist grammarians. Many Central American intellectuals, themselves from voseante nations, have condemned the usage of vos in the past. With the changing mentalities in the Hispanic world, and with the development of descriptive as opposed to prescriptive linguistics, it has become simply a local variant of Spanish. In some places it has become symbolically important and is pointed to with pride as a local defining characteristic.

== History ==
Classical Latin, and the Vulgar Latin from which Romance languages such as Spanish are descended, had only two second-person pronouns – the singular tu and the plural vos. Starting in the early Middle Ages, however, languages such as French and Spanish began to attach honorary significance to these pronouns beyond literal number. Plural pronouns were often used to refer to a person of respect to aggrandize them. Vos, the second-person plural inherited from Latin, came to be used in this manner.

Already by the late 18th century, however, vos itself was restricted to politeness among one's familiar friends. The following extract from a textbook is illustrative of usage at the time:

We seldom make use in Spanish of the second Person Singular or Plural, but when through a great familiarity among friends, or speaking to God, or a wife and husband to themselves, or a father and mother to their children, or to servants.

Examples.

O Dios, sois vos mi Padre verdadéro, O God, thou art my true Father; Tú eres un buen amígo, Thou art a good friend.

— Raymundo del Pueyo, A New Spanish Grammar, or the Elements of the Spanish Language

The standard formal way to address a person one was not on familiar terms with was to address such a person as vuestra merced ("your grace", originally abbreviated as v.m.) in the singular and vuestras mercedes in the plural. Because of the literal meaning of these forms, they were accompanied by the corresponding third-person verb forms. Other formal forms of address included vuestra excelencia ("your excellence", contracted phonetically to ussencia) and vuestra señoría ("your lordship/ladyship", contracted to ussía). Today, both vos and tú are considered to be informal pronouns, with vos being somewhat synonymous with tú in regions where both are used. This was the situation when the Spanish language was brought to the Río de la Plata area (around Buenos Aires and Montevideo) and to Chile.

In time, vos lost currency in Spain but survived in a number of areas in Spanish-speaking America: Argentina, Paraguay, Bolivia (east), Uruguay, El Salvador, Honduras, Costa Rica, Guatemala, Nicaragua, and some smaller areas. The use of tú rather than vos is most associated with areas that were in regular contact with the Iberian Peninsula: Mexico, Panama, Cuba, the Dominican Republic, Venezuela, Colombia, Peru and Equatorial Guinea. Vuestra merced was used as a noun phrase until the late 17th century, when it pronomialized into usted (vuestra merced > usarced > usted). Note that the second person plural pronoun vosotros is a combined form of vos otros (meaning literally 'ye/you others'), while the first person plural nosotros comes from nos otros ("we/us others").

In the first half of the 19th century, the use of vos was as prevalent in Chile as it was in Argentina. The current limitation of the use of vos in Chile is attributed to a campaign to eradicate it by the Chilean education system. The campaign was initiated by Andrés Bello who considered the use of vos a manifestation of lack of education.

== Usage ==
=== Vos in relation to other forms of tú ===
The independent disjunctive pronoun vos also replaces ti, from the tuteo set of forms. That is, vos is both nominative and the form to use after prepositions. Therefore, para vos ("for you") corresponds to the tuteo form para ti, etc.

The preposition-pronoun combination con vos ("with you") is used for the tuteo form contigo.
The direct and indirect object form te is used in both voseo and tuteo.

Nominative	Oblique				Reflexive		
subject	direct object	indirect object	prepositional object	fused with con	direct/indirect object	prepositional object	fused with con
vos	te	te	vos	con vos	te	vos	con vos
usted	lo/la	le	usted	con usted	se	sí	consigo
tú	te	te	ti	contigo	te	ti	contigo
vosotros	os	os	vosotros	con vosotros	os	vosotros	con vosotros

The possessive pronouns of vos also coincide with tú <tu(s), tuyo(s), tuya(s)> rather than with vosotros <vuestro(s), vuestra(s)>.

=== Voseo in Chavacano ===
Chavacano, a Spanish-based creole spoken in the Philippines, employs voseo, while the standard Spanish spoken in the country does not. The Chavacano language below in comparison of other Chavacano dialects and level of formality with Voseo in both subject and possessive pronouns. Note the mixed and co-existing usages of vos, tú, usted, and vosotros.

	Zamboangueño	Caviteño	Bahra	Davaoeño (Castellano Abakay)
2nd person singular	vos/vo/evo/evos (common/informal) tú (familiar) usted (formal)	vo/bo (common) tu (familiar) usté (formal)	vo/bo (common/informal) usté (formal)	usted (formal) vos (informal)
2nd person plural	kamó (common) vosotros (familiar) ustedes (formal)	vusos busos	buhotro bujotro ustedi tedi	ustedes vosotros

	Zamboangueño	Davaoeño (Castellano Abakay)
2nd person singular	de vos (common) de tu (familiar) tuyo (familiar) de tuyo/di tuyo (familiar) de usted (formal)	de tu
2nd person plural	de iño/di inyo (common) de vosotros (familiar) de ustedes (formal)	(de) vos

=== Papiamento ===
Papiamento is a creole with Spanish, Portuguese and African influences. Its pronouns bo (singular) and abo (singular emphatic) are derived from Spanish vos, Portuguese vós and Cape Verdean bo.

=== Conjugation with vos ===
All modern voseo conjugations derive from Old Spanish second person plural -ades, -edes, -ides, and -odes (as in sodes, 'you are'). The 14th and 15th centuries saw an evolution of these conjugations, with -ades originally giving -áis, -edes giving -és (or -ís), -ides giving -ís, and -odes giving -óis. Soon analogous forms -ás and -éis appeared. Hence the variety of forms the contemporary American voseo adopts, some varieties featuring a generalized monophthong (most of them), some a generalized diphthong (e.g. Venezuela), and some combining monophthongs and diphthongs, depending on the conjugation (e.g. Chile). In the most general, monophthongized, conjugation paradigm, a difference between voseo forms and respective tuteo forms is visible exclusively in the present indicative, imperative and subjunctive, and, most of the time, in the preterite. Below is a comparison table of the conjugation of several verbs for tú and for vos, and next to them the one for vosotros, the informal second person plural currently used orally only in Spain; in oratory or legal language (highly formal forms of Spanish) it is used outside of Spain. Verb forms that agree with vos are stressed on the last syllable, causing the loss of the stem diphthong in those verbs, such as poder and venir, which are stem-changing.

A synchronic analysis of voseo verbal forms. Baquero and Westphal (2014) propose an alternative to the traditional account of Chilean and Rioplatense voseo verb forms as deriving from second-person plural (vosotros) forms. Within a generative phonological framework, they argue that the underlying representations of these forms coincide with those of non-honorific second-person singular (tú) forms, with the surface voseo forms resulting from stress assignment and other phonological processes. Their analysis seeks to account for the observed forms without positing certain otherwise unmotivated monophthongization processes. This proposal distinguishes the synchronic representation of voseo forms from their traditional historical derivation.

Verb	Tú: 2. Sg.	Vos General	Tú/Vos Chile^{1}	Vos Southeastern Cuba, Northeastern Colombia^{1, 2}, Venezuela^{3} and Panama^{4}	Vosotros: 2. Pl.; in Spain	Vosotros – בֿוֹזוֹטרוֹז general 2.Pl And Vos – בֿוֹז formal 2.Sg Ladino	Ustedes: 2. Pl	Meaning
ser	eres	sos	erís/sois	sois		sosh סוֹש /soʃ/	son	you are
comer	comes	comés	comís	coméis		komesh קוֹמֵיש /koˈmeʃ/	comen	you eat
poder	puedes	podés	podís	podéis		podesh פּוֹדֵיש /poˈdeʃ/	pueden	you can/may
hablar	hablas	hablás	hablái	habláis		favlash פֿאבֿלאשׁ /faˈvlaʃ/	hablan	you speak
recordar	recuerdas	recordás	recordái	recordáis		recordash רֵיקוֹרדאשׁ /rekorˈdaʃ/	recuerdan	you remember
vivir	vives	vivís				bivish בִּיבִֿיש /biˈviʃ/	viven	you live
venir	vienes	venís				venish בֵֿינִיש /veˈniʃ/	vienen	you come
^{1} Because of the general aspiration of syllable-final [s], the -s of this ending is usually heard as [h] or not pronounced.^{2} In Colombia, the rest of the country that uses vos follows the General Conjugation.^{3} In the state of Zulia^{4} in Azuero

General conjugation is the one that is most widely accepted and used in various countries such as Argentina, Uruguay, Paraguay, parts of Bolivia, Ecuador, and Colombia, as well as Central American countries.

Some Uruguayan speakers combine the pronoun tú with the vos conjugation (for example, tú sabés). Conversely, speakers in some other places where both tú and vos are used combine vos with the tú conjugation (for example, vos sabes). This is a frequent occurrence in the Argentine province of Santiago del Estero.

The verb forms employed with vos are also different in Chilean Spanish: Chileans use -ái and soi 'you are' instead of -áis or -ás and sois or sos. Chileans never pronounce these conjugations with a final -s. The forms erís for 'you are', and habís and hai for 'you have' are also found in Chilean Spanish.

In the case of the ending -ís (such as in comís, podís, vivís, erís, venís), the final -s is pronounced like any other final /s/ in Chilean Spanish. It is most often pronounced as an aspiration similar to the 'h' sound in English. It can also be pronounced as a fricative [s], or be dropped completely. Its variable pronunciation is a phonological rather than a morphological phenomenon.

Venezuelan Maracucho Spanish is notable in that they preserve the diphthongized plural verb forms in all tenses, as still used with vosotros in Spain. Chilean Spanish also notably uses the diphthong -ái.

In Ladino, the -áis, -éis, -ís, & -ois endings are pronounced /aʃ/, /eʃ/, /iʃ/, & /oʃ/.

In Chile, it is much more usual to use tú + vos verb conjugation (tú sabís). The use of pronominal vos (vos sabís) is reserved for very informal situations and may even be considered vulgar in some cases.

==== Present indicative ====
1. General conjugation: the final -r of the infinitive is replaced by -s; in writing, an acute accent is added to the last vowel (i.e. the one preceding the final -s) to indicate stress position.
2. Chilean:
  1. the -ar ending of the infinitive is replaced by -ái
  2. both -er and -ir are replaced by -ís, which sounds more like -íh.
3. Venezuelan (Zulian): practically the same ending as modern Spanish vosotros, yet with the final -s being aspirated so that: -áis, -éis, -ís sound like -áih, -éih, -íh (phonetically resembling Chilean).

VOSEO
Infinitive	Present Indicative		
Infinitive	General	Venezuelan^{1}	Chilean
oír	oís		
venir	venís		
decir	decís		
dormir	dormís		
sentir	sentís		
escribir	escribís		
concluir	concluís		
ir	vas	vais	vai(s)
pensar	pensás	pensáis	pensái
contar	contás	contáis	contái
jugar	jugás	jugáis	jugái
errar	errás	erráis	errái
poder	podés	podéis	podís
querer	querés	queréis	querís
mover	movés	movéis	movís
saber	sabés	sabéis	sabís
ser	sos	sois	soi/erís
haber	has	habéis	habís/hai
^{1} in Zulia; identical ending to modern vosotros

Unlike tú, which has many irregular forms, the only voseo verbs that are conjugated irregularly in the indicative present are ser, ir and haber. However, haber is seldom used in the indicative present, since there is a strong tendency to use preterite instead of present perfect.

==== Affirmative imperative ====
Vos also differs in its affirmative imperative conjugation from both tú and vosotros. Specifically, the vos imperative is formed by dropping the final -r from the infinitive, but keeping the stress on the last syllable. The only verb that is irregular in this regard is ir; its vos imperative is not usually used, with andá (the vos imperative of andar, which is denoted by *) being generally used instead; except for the Argentine province of Tucumán, where the imperative ite is used. For most regular verbs ending in -ir, the vos imperatives use the same conjugations as the yo form in the preterite; almost all verbs that are irregular in the preterite (which are denoted by ‡) retain the regular vos imperative forms.

Verb	Meaning	Tú	Vos	Vosotros (written)
ser	to be	sé	sé	sed
estar	to be	está/estate	está/estate	estad
ir	to go	ve	i/ite *(andá/andate)	id
hablar	to speak	habla	hablá	hablad
callar	to become silent	calla	callá	callad
soltar	to release/let go	suelta	soltá	soltad
comer	to eat	come	comé	comed
mover	to move	mueve	mové	moved
venir	to come	ven	vení ‡	venid
poner	to put	pon	poné	poned
salir	to leave	sal	salí	salid
tener	to have	ten	tené	tened
decir	to say	di	decí ‡	decid
pedir	to ask/order	pide	pedí	pedid

Again, the conjugation of tú has far more irregularities, whereas vos has only one irregular verb in the affirmative imperative.

In Chile, the general vos conjugation is not used in the affirmative imperative.

==== Subjunctive ====
In most places where voseo is used, it is applied also in the subjunctive. In the Río de la Plata region, both the tú-conjugation and the voseo conjugation are found, the tú-form being more common. In this variety, some studies have shown a difference in practice between the tú-form and the vos-form, such that the vos form carries information about the speaker's belief state, and can be stigmatized. For example, in Central America the subjunctive and negative command form is no mintás, and in Chile it is no mintái; however, in Río de la Plata both no mientas and no mintás are found. Real Academia Española models its voseo conjugation tables on the most frequent, unstigmatized Río de la Plata usage and therefore omits the subjunctive voseo.

Central America^{1} Bolivia	Río de la Plata region	Chile	Venezuela (Zulia) Panama (Azuero)	meaning
No quiero que mintás.	No quiero que mientas.	No quiero que mintái.	No quiero que mintáis.	I don't want you to lie.
No temás.	No temas.	No temái.	No temáis.	Do not fear.
Que durmás bien	Que duermas bien.	Que durmái bien.	Que durmáis bien.	Sleep well.
No te preocupés.	No te preocupes.	No te preocupís.	No te preocupéis.	Don't worry.
^{1}including areas in Colombia with voseo, e.g. the Paisa region.

=== Verbal voseo and pronominal voseo ===
- 'Verbal voseo' refers to the use of the verb conjugation of vos regardless of which pronoun is used.

Verbal voseo with a pronoun other than vos is widespread in Chile, in which case one would use the pronoun tú and the verb conjugation of vos at the same time. E.g.: tú venís, tú escribís, tú podís, tú sabís, tú vai, tú estái.
There are some partially rare cases of a similar sort of verbal voseo in Uruguay where one would say for example tú podés or tú sabés.

- 'Pronominal voseo' is the use of the pronoun vos regardless of verb conjugation.

== Geographical distribution ==
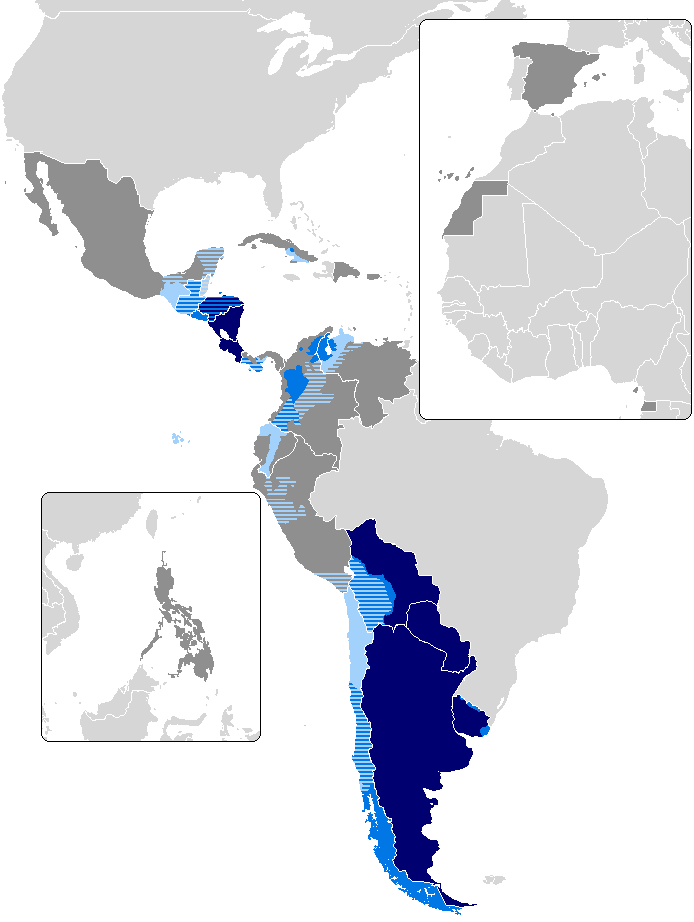
Distribution of voseo: primarily spoken + written primarily spoken spoken, alternating with tuteo absent

=== Countries where voseo is predominant ===
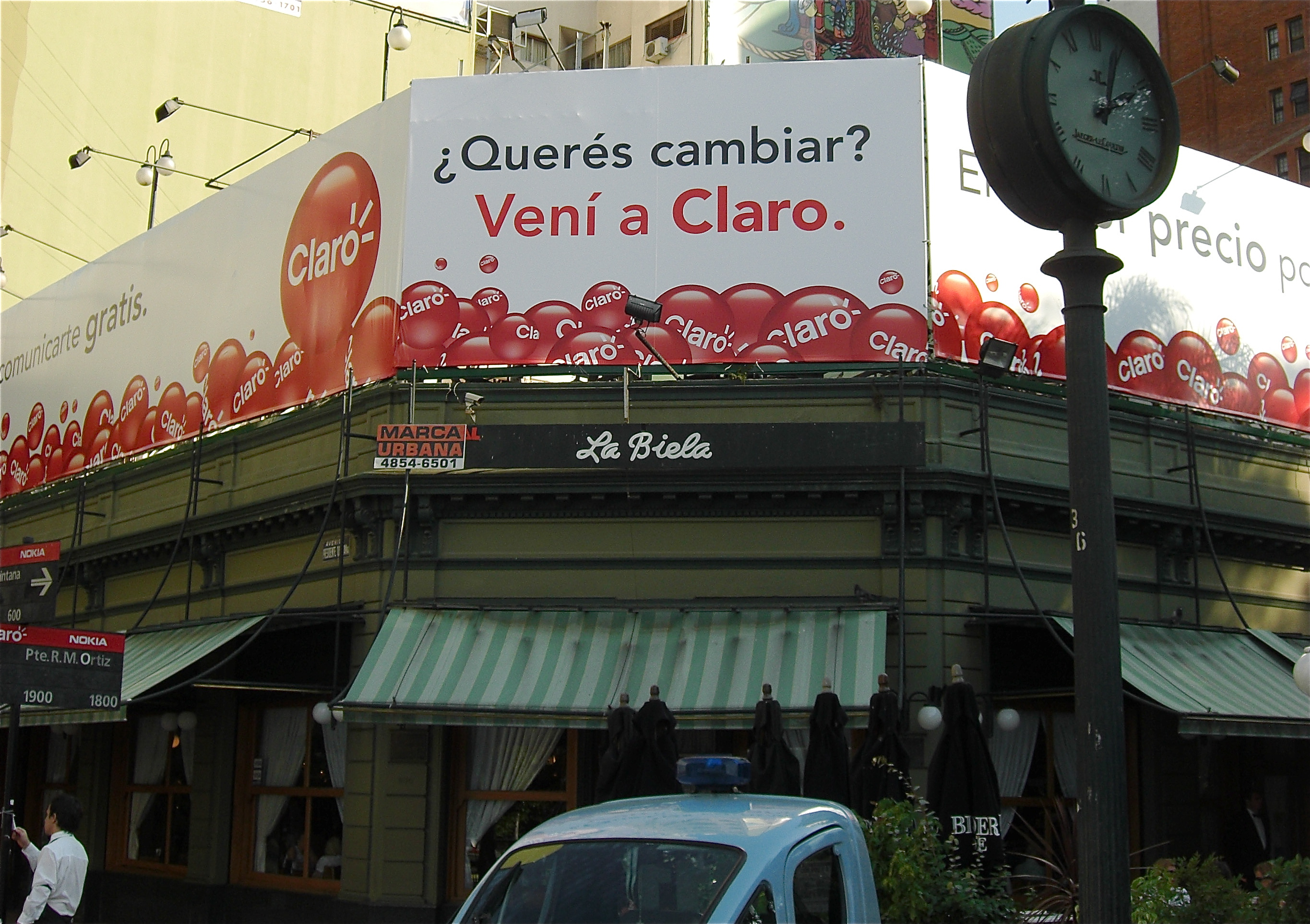
Voseo used on a billboard in Buenos Aires, Argentina: ¿Querés cambiar? Vení a Claro ("Do you want to change? Come to Claro."). In tuteo, it would have been ¿Quieres cambiar? Ven a Claro.

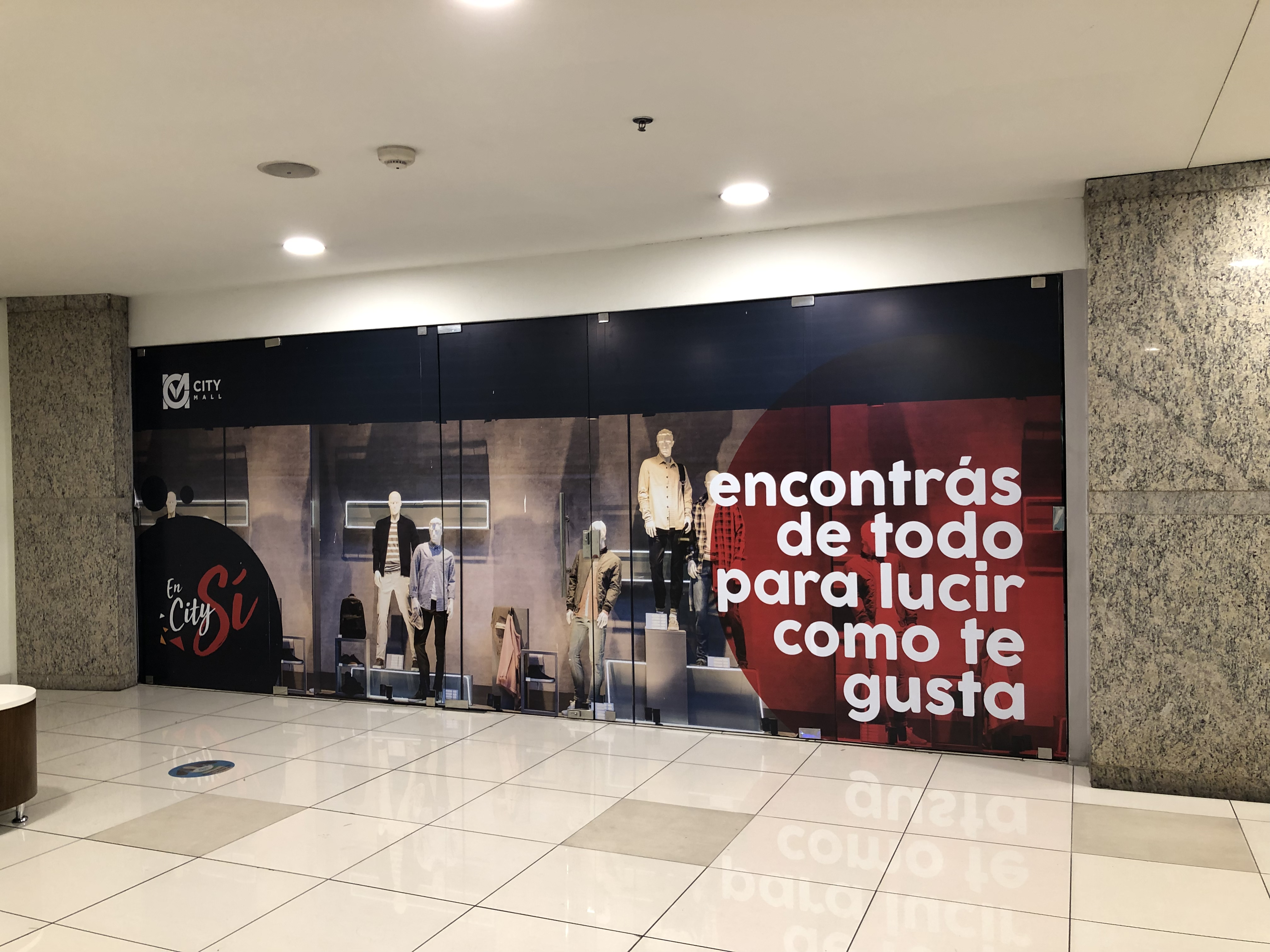
Voseo used on signage inside a shopping mall in Tegucigalpa, Honduras: Encontrás de todo para lucir como te gusta ("You find everything to look how you like"). The tuteo equivalent would have been Encuentras de todo para lucir como te gusta

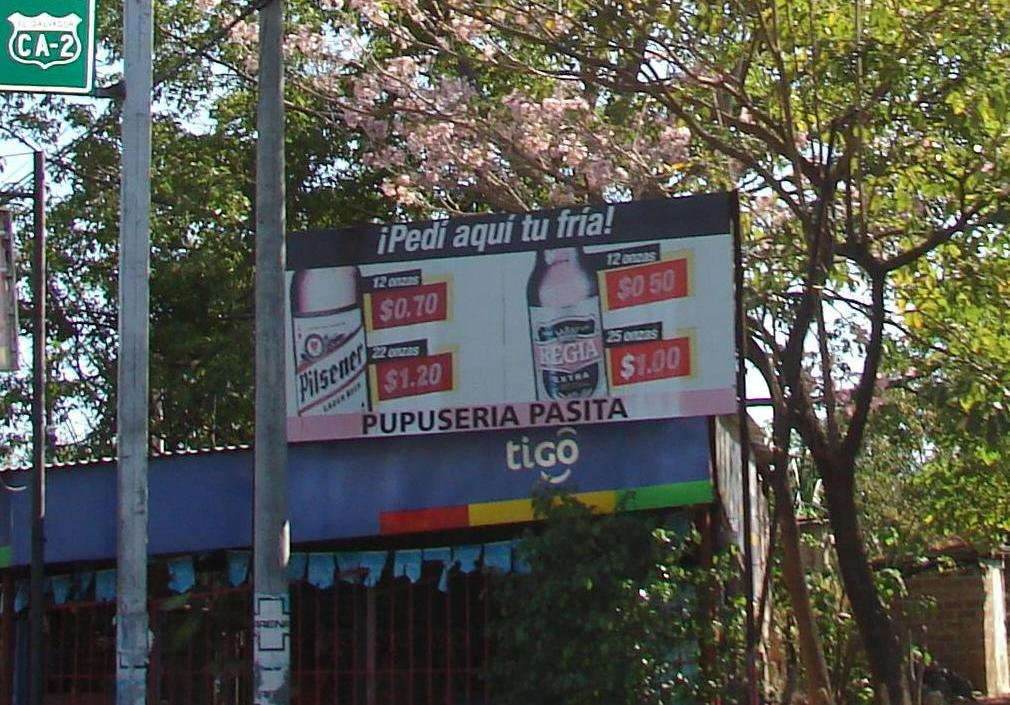
Voseo used on a billboard in El Salvador: ¡Pedí aquí tu fría! ("Order your cold one here!"). The tuteo equivalent would have been ¡Pide aquí tu fría!

In South America:

1. Aruba, Bonaire and Curaçao – Papiamento pronouns bo and abo. There is no reflex for tú. The verbs are not inflected for person.
2. Argentina – both pronominal and verbal voseo, the pronoun tú is not preferred.
3. Paraguay – both pronominal and verbal voseo, the pronoun tú is uncommon in most of the country.
4. Uruguay – dual-usage of both pronominal and verbal voseo and a combination of the pronoun tú + verb conjugated in the vos form, except near the Brazilian border, where only pronominal and verbal tuteo is common.

In Central America:

1. Guatemala – three-tiered system is used to indicate the degree of respect or familiarity: usted, tú, vos. Usted expresses distance and respect; tú corresponds to an intermediate level of familiarity, but not deep trust; vos is the pronoun of maximum familiarity and solidarity. Pronominal tú is frequent with verbal voseo.
2. Honduras – three-tiered system is used to indicate the degree of respect or familiarity: usted, tú, vos. Usted expresses distance and respect; tú corresponds to an intermediate level of familiarity, but not deep trust; vos is the pronoun of maximum familiarity and solidarity.
3. Nicaragua – both pronominal and verbal voseo throughout all social classes; tú is mostly used in writing. Tuteo is increasingly common in tourist areas.
4. Costa Rica – voseo has historically been used, back in the 2000s it was losing ground to ustedeo and tuteo, especially among younger speakers. Vos is now primarily used orally with friends and family in Cartago, Guanacaste province, the San José metropolitan area and near the Nicaraguan border and in advertising signage. Usted is the primary form in other areas and with strangers. Tuteo is rarely used, but when it is used in speech by a Costa Rican, it is commonly considered fake and effeminate.
5. El Salvador – three-tiered system is used to indicate the degree of respect or familiarity: usted, tú, vos. Usted expresses distance and respect; tú corresponds to an intermediate level of familiarity, but not deep trust; vos is the pronoun of maximum familiarity and solidarity and also lack of respect.

=== Countries where voseo is extensive, but not predominant ===
In South America:

1. Bolivia – in the Lowlands of Eastern Bolivia—with mestizo, Criollo and German descendants majority—(Santa Cruz, Beni, Pando, Tarija and the Lowlands of La Paz) voseo is used universally; while in the Highlands of Western Bolivia—with indigenous peoples majority—(highlands of La Paz, Oruro, Potosí, Chuquisaca and Cochabamba) tú is predominant, but there is still a strong use of voseo, especially in verb forms.
2. Chile – verbal voseo and pronominal tú is used in informal situations, whereas pronominal voseo is reserved only for very intimate situations or to offend someone. In every other situation and in writing, the normal tú or usted pronouns are used.

=== Countries where voseo occurs in some areas ===
In the following countries, voseo is used only in certain areas:

- Colombia – in the following departments:
  - In the west (along the Pacific coast):
    - Chocó
    - Valle del Cauca
    - Cauca
    - Nariño
  - In the center – primarily the Paisa region (Antioquia, Risaralda, Quindío, and Caldas Departments).
  - In the (north)east:
    - Norte de Santander – Ocaña region
    - La Guajira
    - Cesar
- Cuba – in Camagüey Province, often used alongside tú.
- Ecuador – in the Sierra, the center, and Esmeraldas.
- Mexico – widely used in the countryside of the state of Chiapas by indigenous populations and becoming rare among the same groups in the state of Tabasco.
- Panama – in the west along the border with Costa Rica.
- Peru – in some areas in both the Northern and Southern ends of the country.
- Puerto Rico – At the eastern end of the island in Fajardo.
- The Philippines – among Chavacano speakers in Mindanao and Luzon, but otherwise absent in standard Spanish.
- Spain – in La Gomera island, in The Canaries, often used alongside tú.
- The United States – Found among speakers with origins in countries where voseo is predominant—for instance, among Honduran Americans. In other circumstances, tú is used by default.
- Venezuela – in the northwest (primarily in Zulia State).

=== Countries where voseo is virtually absent ===
In the following countries, voseo has disappeared completely among the native population:

- Dominican Republic
- Peninsular Spain

== See also ==
- Portuguese personal pronouns § Colloquial usage – Similar trends
- Spanish dialects and varieties
- Spanish verbs
- T–V distinction
- T–V distinction in the world's languages § Romance languages

== Sources ==
- (in Spanish) Díaz Collazos, Ana María. Desarrollo sociolingüístico del voseo en la región andina de Colombia (1555–1976)
- (in Spanish) El voseo at Spanish Wikibooks
- (in French) Le Voseo
- (in Spanish) Voseo Spanish Site dedicated to teaching Argentine Voseo usage
- (in Spanish) Carricaburo. Norma Beatriz (2003). El voseo en la historia y en la lengua de hoy – Las fórmulas de tratamiento en el español actual
- (in Spanish) Hotta. Hideo (2000). La estandarización y el regionalismo en el voseo del español argentino
- (in Spanish) Roca, Luis Alberto (2007). Breve historia del habla cruceña y su mestizaje
- (in Spanish) Rosenblat, Ángel (2000). El castellano en Venezuela
- (in Spanish) Toursinov, Antón (2005). Formas pronominales de tratamiento en el español actual de Guatemala
- (in English) Posta: Argentinian Spanish voseo from Argentina
