= West Iberian languages =

Branch of the Iberian Romance languages

West Iberian
- Common Western Iberian Romance, Western Iberian Romance, Southwestern Shifted Romance (Note: If Pyrenean–Mozarabic isn't included in either Iberian or Gallo-Romance)
- Geographic distribution: Iberian Peninsula, Latin America, Latin Africa, Argentine Antarctica, Israel, Philippines, East Timor, Easter Island, Goa, Macau
- Linguistic classification: Indo-European: Italic; Latino-Faliscan; Latinic; Romance; Italo-Western; Western Romance; Gallo-Iberian?; Iberian Romance; West Iberian
- Subdivisions: Asturleonese • Asturian • Cantabrian • Leonese • Mirandese • Palra d'El Rebollal (Note: Palra d'El Rebollal is considered either a Leonese dialect or an Extremaduran dialect which didn't undergo Castilianization.); Castilian • Spanish • Judaeo-Spanish • Extremaduran (Note: Extremaduran is sometimes considered a Castilianized Asturleonese dialect.); Galician–Portuguese • Portuguese • Judaeo-Portuguese • Galician • Fala

Language codes
- Glottolog: west2838
- Languages of the Iberian Peninsula; West Iberian Romance: Aragonese Asturleonese (incl. Mirandese) Galician Portuguese Fala Extremaduran Barranquenho Spanish Occitano-Romance: Catalan (incl. Valencian) Occitan Non-Indo-European: Basque (language isolate)

West Iberian is a branch of the Ibero-Romance languages that includes the Castilian languages (Spanish, Judaeo-Spanish), Astur-Leonese (Asturian, Leonese, Mirandese, Extremaduran (sometimes), Cantabrian), and Galician-Portuguese.

Until a few centuries ago, they formed a dialect continuum covering the western, central and southern parts of the Iberian Peninsula—excepting the Basque and Catalan-speaking territories. This is still the situation in a few regions, particularly in the northern part of the peninsula, but due to the differing sociopolitical histories of these languages (independence of Portugal since the early 12th century, unification of Spain in the late 15th century under the Catholic Monarchs, who privileged Castilian Spanish over the other Iberian languages), Spanish and Portuguese have tended to overtake and to a large extent absorb their sister languages while they kept diverging from each other.

There is controversy over whether the members of the modern Galician-Portuguese and Astur-Leonese sub-groups are languages or dialects. A common, though disputed, classification is to state that Portuguese and Galician are separate languages, as are Asturian, Leonese, and Mirandese. Cantabrian and Extremaduran are considered codialects of the Leonese language for UNESCO, whereas the latter is a Castilian dialect in the ISO codes.

Papiamento is a West Iberian creole language spoken in the Dutch West Indies and believed to be derived from Portuguese, Judaeo-Portuguese and Spanish.

== Classification ==
Bold indicates language families. Daggers indicate extinct languages.

- **West Iberian**
  - **Asturleonese**
    - Asturian
    - Leonese
    - Mirandese
    - Extremaduran
      - Palra d'El Rebollal
    - Cantabrian
  - **Castilian**
    - Extremaduran
    - Judaeo-Spanish
    - Spanish
      - Loreto-Ucayali
  - **Galician-Portuguese**
    - Galician
      - Galician-Asturian
    - Portuguese
    - Fala
    - † Judaeo-Portuguese
