= Maria Josefa Canellada =

Spanish philologist, dialectologist, folklorist and writer (1912–1995)

María Josefa Canellada
- María Josefa Canellada
- Born: María Josefa Canellada Llavona; 12 November 1913; Infiesto, Asturias, Spain
- Died: 7 May 1995; Madrid, Spain
- Education: Central University of Madrid
- Occupations: Philologist, dialectologist, folklorist, writer
- Known for: Asturian dialectology, Spanish phonetics
- Spouse: Alonso Zamora Vicente

María Josefa Canellada Llavona (12 November 1913 – 7 May 1995) was a Spanish philologist, Romance scholar, dialectologist, folklorist and writer. Born in Asturias, she specialised in the study of the Asturian language, Spanish phonetics and dialectology, while also producing fiction and children's literature in Spanish and Asturian.

Canellada studied at the Central University of Madrid and received her doctorate in 1943 with a dissertation on the Asturian dialect spoken in Cabranes, published as El bable de Cabranes (1944). She trained in phonetics at the Centre for Historical Studies under Tomás Navarro Tomás and later conducted research and taught at institutions in Spain and abroad. Her academic work encompassed phonetic description, dialectological research, folklore, literary editing and lexicography. Between 1979 and 1988, she was principal editor of the Diccionario de la lengua española of the Royal Spanish Academy.

Alongside her scholarly activities, Canellada wrote works of fiction, notably the novel Penal de Ocaña, based on experiences connected with the Spanish Civil War. Its publication was initially prevented by Francoist censorship. She also contributed to the development of written children's literature in Asturian through Montesín (1980). She was a founding member of the Academia de la Llingua Asturiana in 1981.

== Personal life and education ==
Canellada was born on 12 November 1913 in Infiesto, in the Asturian municipality of Piloña. Her family had close ties to Torazo, in the neighbouring municipality of Cabranes, where she spent part of her childhood. The area subsequently became the subject of her doctoral research.

She moved to Madrid while young and attended the Instituto San Isidro before entering the Faculty of Philosophy and Letters of the Central University of Madrid in 1933. Her teachers included Tomás Navarro Tomás, Pedro Salinas, Xavier Zubiri, Rafael Lapesa, José Fernández Montesinos, Américo Castro and Ramón Menéndez Pidal. Between 1933 and 1936 she collaborated with Salinas on the literary journal Índice and worked with Navarro Tomás in the phonetics laboratory. She also trained within the philological school of Ramón Menéndez Pidal, collaborating with him on research concerning the traditional Spanish folk ballads (the Romancero).

The outbreak of the Spanish Civil War in 1936 interrupted her studies. During the conflict, she worked as a volunteer nurse at a field hospital established by the Spanish Republican Army in the Casino de Madrid. As the building came under repeated artillery bombardment, the hospital was transferred at the beginning of 1937 to a former prison in Ocaña, which had been converted into a hospital. Her experiences during this period later provided material for her novel Penal de Ocaña.

After the war, Canellada finished her university education. Under the supervision of Dámaso Alonso, she prepared a doctoral dissertation on the Asturian dialect spoken in Cabranes. Completed in 1943, it was published the following year as El bable de Cabranes.

Canellada married the philologist Alonso Zamora Vicente in 1946 and had two sons. Both worked in Spanish philology and literary studies, and their professional careers involved research, teaching and editorial work in Spain and abroad. Canellada died in Madrid on 7 May 1995.

== Academic career ==
=== Early research ===
Canellada began her academic career in philology and phonetic research. Between 1940 and 1946, Canellada was affiliated with the Menéndez y Pelayo Institute of the Spanish National Research Council (CSIC). She undertook further phonetics training at the University of Coimbra, where she worked with the Portuguese phonetician Armando de Lacerda. Her collaboration with Lacerda resulted in Comportamientos tonales vocálicos en español y portugués (1945), a comparative study of vocalic tonal behaviour in Spanish and Portuguese. The publication formed part of her continuing research into the phonetic description of Romance languages.

Canellada also contributed to the scholarly editing of Spanish literature. In 1947, she collaborated with her husband, Alonso Zamora Vicente, on the second volume of Comedias by the seventeenth-century playwright Tirso de Molina.

=== Teaching and international appointments ===
Canellada's academic activities extended beyond Spain through teaching appointments and research collaborations in Europe and the Americas. Phonetics and Spanish language teaching remained recurring areas of her professional activity. From 1946 to 1948 Canellada taught in the Faculty of Philosophy and Letters at the University of Salamanca. Between 1948 and 1952 she lived with her husband Zamora Vicente in Buenos Aires, where he directed the Institute of Philology at the Faculty of Philosophy and Letters. She later returned to the University of Salamanca as a teacher in courses for foreign students between 1952 and 1958. In 1960 she worked with the philology section of El Colegio de México. In 1964 she taught Spanish phonetics at Middlebury College, and between 1966 and 1974 she taught in New York University programmes in Spain. She also taught at the Complutense University of Madrid between 1970 and 1973. In 1974 and 1975, she taught Spanish language and Spanish literature to teachers from English-speaking Caribbean countries. In 1981, she was a visiting professor at the Romance Languages Institute of the University of Copenhagen. From 1976 to 1983, she gave Hispano-Philippine courses for Spanish teachers.

=== Lexicography and later research ===
Canellada continued to collaborate with scientific institutions in Spain. Many lexical data collected by Canellada were later integrated in the 1953 monograph of her husband, Zamora Vicente, Léxico rural asturiano: palabras y cosas de Libardón (Colunga). From 1958 to 1962 she worked at the Menéndez Pidal Seminary, particularly on research relating to the Spanish Romancero, a corpus of traditional folk ballads.

Between 1979 and 1988 she served as principal editor of the fourth edition of the Diccionario de la lengua española of the Royal Spanish Academy.

== Linguistic and folkloric research ==
=== Asturian dialectology ===
Canellada's doctoral dissertation, published as El bable de Cabranes (1944), examined the variety of Asturian spoken in Cabranes, the district from which her family originated. Drawing on her familiarity with the region and her training in phonetics and dialectology, she documented its pronunciation, grammatical features and vocabulary.

Canellada's 1944 study is considered among the pioneering monographs of Asturian dialectology. The study attracted scholarly attention beyond Spain. In a detailed review published in the American journal Language in 1947, the linguist Yakov Malkiel praised the accuracy of Canellada's field observations, her phonetic transcriptions and the extensive linguistic material she had collected. He particularly valued the vocabulary of approximately 3,500 entries. Canellada's findings also attracted attention of Romance linguists. In his 1950 study of Proto-Romance reconstruction, the linguist Robert A. Hall cited Malkiel's examination of the Cabranes dialect in connection with the historical development of final vowels in Romance languages.

Canellada's interest in Asturian extended beyond linguistic description to the collection and study of regional oral traditions, including folktales and other traditional narratives. This work was reflected in her publications Cuentos populares asturianos (1978) and Leyendas, cuentos y tradiciones (1983).

=== Phonetics and language studies ===
Phonetics remained a central concern throughout Canellada's career, beginning with her work under Navarro Tomás and continuing through her collaboration with Lacerda, her teaching appointments and her later publications.

In 1950, Canellada collaborated with Dámaso Alonso and Alonso Zamora Vicente on "Vocales andaluzas: Contribución al estudio de la fonología peninsular", published in the Nueva Revista de Filología Hispánica. The study examined vowel pronunciation in eastern Andalusian Spanish, particularly the phonetic distinctions associated with the loss of final consonants. This work subsequently became a reference point in research on Andalusian phonetics and phonology.

Her phonetic publications included Comportamientos tonales vocálicos en español y portugués (1945) and Antología de textos fonéticos (1965). She also collaborated with John Kuhlmann Madsen on Pronunciación del español: lengua hablada y literaria (1987).

== Literary work ==
Although Canellada pursued an academic career in philology, she also wrote fiction throughout her life. Her literary work included novels, short narratives and children's stories, published in both Spanish and Asturian.

=== Penal de Ocaña ===
Canellada's novel Penal de Ocaña (lit. 'The Prison of Ocaña') drew on her experiences as a nurse during the Spanish Civil War. Its central character, a young philology student who volunteers in wartime hospitals, shares elements of her educational background and wartime experience.

The novel was a finalist for the Café Gijón Prize in 1954. However, its publication was delayed by the censorship system of Francoist Spain. In 1955, after the text had reached an advanced stage of preparation for publication, the authorities prohibited its release. Excerpts appeared in literary periodicals during the late 1950s, and a shorter edition was published in 1964 by Editorial Bullón. The expanded text was finally published in 1985.

The novel's publication history is used as an example of the effect of Francoist censorship on literary production and of woman's account of the Spanish civil war.

=== Children's literature ===
Canellada also wrote for children and contributed to the development of published literature for young readers in Asturian. Her works in Spanish included Suca y el oso and El tío Tanón, la tía Tana y la historia de Tanín. In 1972, she published La verdadera historia de Montesín (The True Story of Montesín) in Spanish. This work would become the basis for the first children's book in Asturian.

Published in Asturian in 1980, Montesín occupies a significant place in the history of Asturian-language children's literature. It is considered as a starting point for the development of a modern written tradition for young readers. The book's position in Asturian literary history is also recognised by the Government of Asturias, which identifies it as a foundational work of children's and young-adult fiction in the language. Ten years later, she published another work in Asturian, Malia, Mariantia y yo (1990).

== Institutional activities and recognition ==
Canellada participated in the institutional development of Asturian-language scholarship and culture during the later decades of her life. Her involvement in the academy linked her earlier dialectological work with contemporary efforts to study, document and develop the written use of Asturian. In April 1981 she was appointed to the first governing board of the newly established Academia de la Llingua Asturiana, alongside Ana María Cano, José Luis García Arias, Josefa Martínez de Alarcos, Lorenzo Novo Mier and Xuan Xosé Sánchez Vicente.

In 1986 she became a corresponding member of the Royal Spanish Academy.

== Legacy ==
Canellada's work has been studied in relation to several fields: Asturian dialectology, Romance phonetics, Spanish lexicography, folklore and twentieth-century Spanish literature. Her career connected the philological research tradition of Menéndez Pidal and Navarro Tomás with later developments in the study and institutional recognition of Asturian.

In 2002, Asturias's annual Selmana de les Lletres Asturianes (Week of the Asturian Letters) was dedicated to her and a commemorative volume examining her life and work was published for the occasion. Her contribution to children's literature is commemorated by the Premiu María Josefa Canellada de Lliteratura Infantil y Xuvenil, awarded since 2008 by the Government of Asturias for works of children's and young-adult literature in Asturian.

== Selected works, ==
=== Linguistics and philology ===
- Canellada, María Josefa (1944). El bable de Cabranes (in Spanish). Madrid: Consejo Superior de Investigaciones Científicas.
- Canellada, María Josefa; Lacerda, Armando de (1945). Comportamientos tonales vocálicos en español y portugués (in Spanish). Madrid.
- Canellada, María Josefa (1965). Antología de textos fonéticos (in Spanish). Madrid.
- Canellada, María Josefa; Madsen, John Kuhlmann (1987). Pronunciación del español: lengua hablada y literaria (in Spanish). Madrid. ISBN 978-84-7039-483-6.

=== Fiction and children's literature ===
- Canellada, María Josefa (1944). Suca y el oso (in Spanish).
- Canellada, María Josefa (1944). El tío Tanón, la tía Tana y la historia de Tanín (in Spanish).
- Canellada, María Josefa (1964). Penal de Ocaña (in Spanish). Madrid: Editorial Bullón.
- Canellada, María Josefa (1980). Montesín (in Asturian). Salinas: Ayalga Ediciones. ISBN 9788474110869.
- Canellada, María Josefa (1985). Penal de Ocaña. Colección Austral (in Spanish). Madrid: Espasa-Calpe. ISBN 9788423916535.
- Canellada, María Josefa (1990). Malia, Mariantia y yo (in Asturian).

=== Folklore ===
- Canellada, María Josefa (1978). Cuentos populares asturianos. Biblioteca Popular Asturiana (in Spanish). Salinas: Ayalga. ISBN 9788474110593.
- Canellada, María Josefa (1983). Leyendas, cuentos y tradiciones (in Spanish). Gijón: Ayalga. ISBN 8474111250.

=== Edited works ===
- Lucas Fernández (1976). Canellada, María Josefa (ed.). Farsas y églogas (in Spanish). Madrid.
- Íñigo López de Mendoza (1980). Canellada, María Josefa (ed.). Refranero (in Spanish). Madrid.

== Sources ==
- Busto Cortina, Xuan Carlos, ed. (2002). María Josefa Canellada (1913–1995): un volume conmemorativu [María Josefa Canellada (1913–1995): A commemorative volume] (in Asturian). Uviéu: Gobiernu del Principáu d'Asturies, Conseyería d'Educación y Cultura. ISBN 9788478475438.
- Bleorțu, Cristina; Cuevas Alonso, Miguel (2025). "Review of Estudiu llingüísticu nel centru-occidente asturianu (ELCOA): Pequeñu Atles Dialectográficu, by Miguel Rodríguez Monteavaro". Vox Romanica (in Spanish). 84: 309–311. doi:10.24053/VOX-2025-028.
- "Canellada Llavona, María Josefa". Memoria del CSIC (in Spanish). Consejo Superior de Investigaciones Científicas.
- García Oliva, Vicente (2010). "Apuntes pa una Historia de la Lliteratura Infantil y Xuvenil (LLIX) n'asturianu" [Notes Towards a History of Children's and Young Adult Literature in Asturian] (PDF). Lletres Asturianes (in Asturian). 103. Academia de la Llingua Asturiana: 85–92. ISSN 0212-0534.
- Navas Sánchez-Élez, María Victoria; Ribera Llopis, Juan M. (2017). "La obra narrativa de Alonso Zamora Vicente y María Josefa Canellada bajo la mirada del censor" [The Narrative Work of Alonso Zamora Vicente and María Josefa Canellada under the Censor's Scrutiny]. Revista de Filología Románica (in Spanish). 34 (Special issue). Universidad Complutense de Madrid: 89–99. doi:10.5209/RFRM.58158. ISSN 0212-999X.
- Prendes Guardiola, Manuel (3 March 2010). "Mujer en la guerra: Sobre "Penal de Ocaña", de María Josefa Canellada" [Woman at War: On "Penal de Ocaña" by María Josefa Canellada]. Literarias (in Spanish). Escritores de Asturias. Archived from the original on 24 March 2014.
- "María Josefa Canellada Llavona". Historia Hispánica – Diccionario biográfico español (in Spanish). Real Academia de la Historia.
- "Premiu María Josefa Canellada de Lliteratura Infantil y Xuvenil" [María Josefa Canellada Prize for Children's and Young Adult Literature]. Política Llingüística (in Asturian). Gobierno del Principado de Asturias.
- Vaquero, José Manuel (14 April 1981). "Creada en Oviedo la Academia de la Lengua Asturiana" [Academy of the Asturian Language Established in Oviedo]. El País (in Spanish).
- Zuleta, Emilia de (1994). "María Josefa Canellada, narradora" [María Josefa Canellada as a Fiction Writer]. In Pallares, Berta; Peira, Pedro; Sánchez Lobato, Jesús (eds.). Sin fronteras: homenaje a María Josefa Canellada (in Spanish). Madrid: Editorial Complutense. pp. 599–611. ISBN 8474914833.
- Fernández González, María del Pilar (2002). "María Josefa Canellada: un esbozu biográficu" [María Josefa Canellada: A Biographical Sketch]. In Busto Cortina, Xuan Carlos (ed.). María Josefa Canellada (1913–1995): un volume conmemorativu (in Asturian). Uviéu: Gobiernu del Principáu d'Asturies, Conseyería d'Educación y Cultura. pp. 11–25. ISBN 9788478475438.
- Viejo Fernández, Xulio (2002). "María Josefa Canellada y la Filoloxía Asturiana: del trabayu, la llucidez y la ética científica" [María Josefa Canellada and Asturian Philology: Work, Insight and Scientific Ethics]. In Busto Cortina, Xuan Carlos (ed.). María Josefa Canellada (1913–1995): un volume conmemorativu (in Asturian). Uviéu: Gobiernu del Principáu d'Asturies, Conseyería d'Educación y Cultura. pp. 53–64. ISBN 9788478475438.
- Fernández González, María del Pilar (2002). "Una güeyada a la obra n'asturianu de Mª Josefa Canellada nel so contestu lliterariu" [A Look at María Josefa Canellada's Works in Asturian within Their Literary Context]. In Busto Cortina, Xuan Carlos (ed.). María Josefa Canellada (1913–1995): un volume conmemorativu (in Asturian). Uviéu: Gobiernu del Principáu d'Asturies, Conseyería d'Educación y Cultura. pp. 137–145. ISBN 9788478475438.
- Martínez, Pilar (1994). "Interpretaciones de "La verdadera historia de Montesín" de María Josefa Canellada" [Interpretations of "The True Story of Montesín" by María Josefa Canellada]. In Pallares, Berta; Peira, Pedro; Sánchez Lobato, Jesús (eds.). Sin fronteras: homenaje a María Josefa Canellada (in Spanish). Madrid: Editorial Complutense. pp. 395–402. ISBN 8474914833.
- Malkiel, Yakov (1947). "El bable de Cabranes. By María Josefa Canellada". Language. 23 (1). Linguistic Society of America: 60–66. doi:10.2307/409711. JSTOR 409711.
- Malkiel, Yakov (1970). Patterns of Derivational Affixation in the Cabraniego Dialect of East-Central Asturian. University of California Publications in Linguistics. Vol. 64. Berkeley and Los Angeles: University of California Press. pp. 1–95.
- Pallares, Berta; Peira, Pedro; Sánchez Lobato, Jesús, eds. (1994). Sin fronteras: homenaje a María Josefa Canellada [Without Borders: A Tribute to María Josefa Canellada] (in Spanish). Madrid: Editorial Complutense. ISBN 8474914833. OCLC 32732107.
- Hall, Robert A. Jr. (1950). "The Reconstruction of Proto-Romance". Language. 26 (1). Linguistic Society of America: 6–27. doi:10.2307/410406. JSTOR 410406.
- Alonso, Dámaso; Zamora Vicente, Alonso; Canellada, María Josefa (1950). "Vocales andaluzas: Contribución al estudio de la fonología peninsular" [Andalusian Vowels: A Contribution to the Study of Peninsular Phonology]. Nueva Revista de Filología Hispánica (in Spanish). 4 (3). El Colegio de México: 209–230. doi:10.24201/nrfh.v4i3.159.
- Herrero de Haro, Alfredo (2017). "The phonetics and phonology of Eastern Andalusian Spanish: A review of literature from 1881 to 2016". Íkala, Revista de Lenguaje y Cultura. 22 (2): 313–357. doi:10.17533/udea.ikala.v22n02a09.
- Tirso de Molina (1947). Comedias (in Spanish). Vol. 2. Prologue and notes by María Josefa Canellada and Alonso Zamora Vicente. Espasa-Calpe.
- Gasnier, Juliette (2025). "Le pénitencier d'Ocaña de María Josefa Canellada". Atlante. Revue d'études romanes (in French). 22 (22). Université de Lille. doi:10.4000/143ey. ISSN 2426-394X.
- Popeanga Chelaru, Eugenia (1984). "María Josefa Canellada, Leyendas, cuentos y tradiciones". Revista de Filología Románica (in Spanish). 2. Universidad Complutense de Madrid: 306-307.
- Zamora Vicente, Alonso (1953). Léxico rural asturiano: Palabras y cosas de Libardón (Colunga) [Asturian Rural Vocabulary: Words and Things of Libardón (Colunga)] (in Spanish). Granada: Universidad de Granada.
- "María Josefa Canellada Llavona". Biblioteca Virtual María Josefa Canellada (in Asturian). Archived from the original on 28 March 2012.
- Ramírez Carrasco, Miguel Ángel (2023). "El Casino de Madrid durante la guerra civil española (I)" [The Casino de Madrid during the Spanish Civil War (I)]. Real Casino de Madrid (in Spanish). No. 108. Real Casino de Madrid. pp. 52–66.
