= Aníbal Otero =

Aníbal Otero Álvarez (21 January 1911 – 1 March 1974) was a Spanish linguist, philologist and writer, who wrote in both Galician and Spanish. In 1936, after the beginning of the Spanish Civil War, he was mistaken for a spy and given a death penalty by Francoist authorities, which was commuted to life imprisonment; he remained in prison until 1941.

== Biography ==
Otero Álvarez studied philosophy and literature in Madrid. He participated in the elaboration of the Atlas Lingüístico de la Península Ibérica promoted by Ramón Menéndez Pidal and directed by the phonetician Tomás Navarro Tomás, with the gathering of material in Galicia and the north of Portugal, where he was caught by surprise by the nationalist uprising in 1936. Turned in by Salazarist authorities to the Francoists on 5 August 1936, his notes with phonetic transcriptions were considered proof of spying in favor of the Republic. Despite the fact that people such as Ramón Menéndez Pidal, Rafael Lapesa and the priest Jesús Carro pled on his behalf, Otero was sentenced to death. After the sentence was commuted to life imprisonment, he remained in prison until 1941.

== Works ==
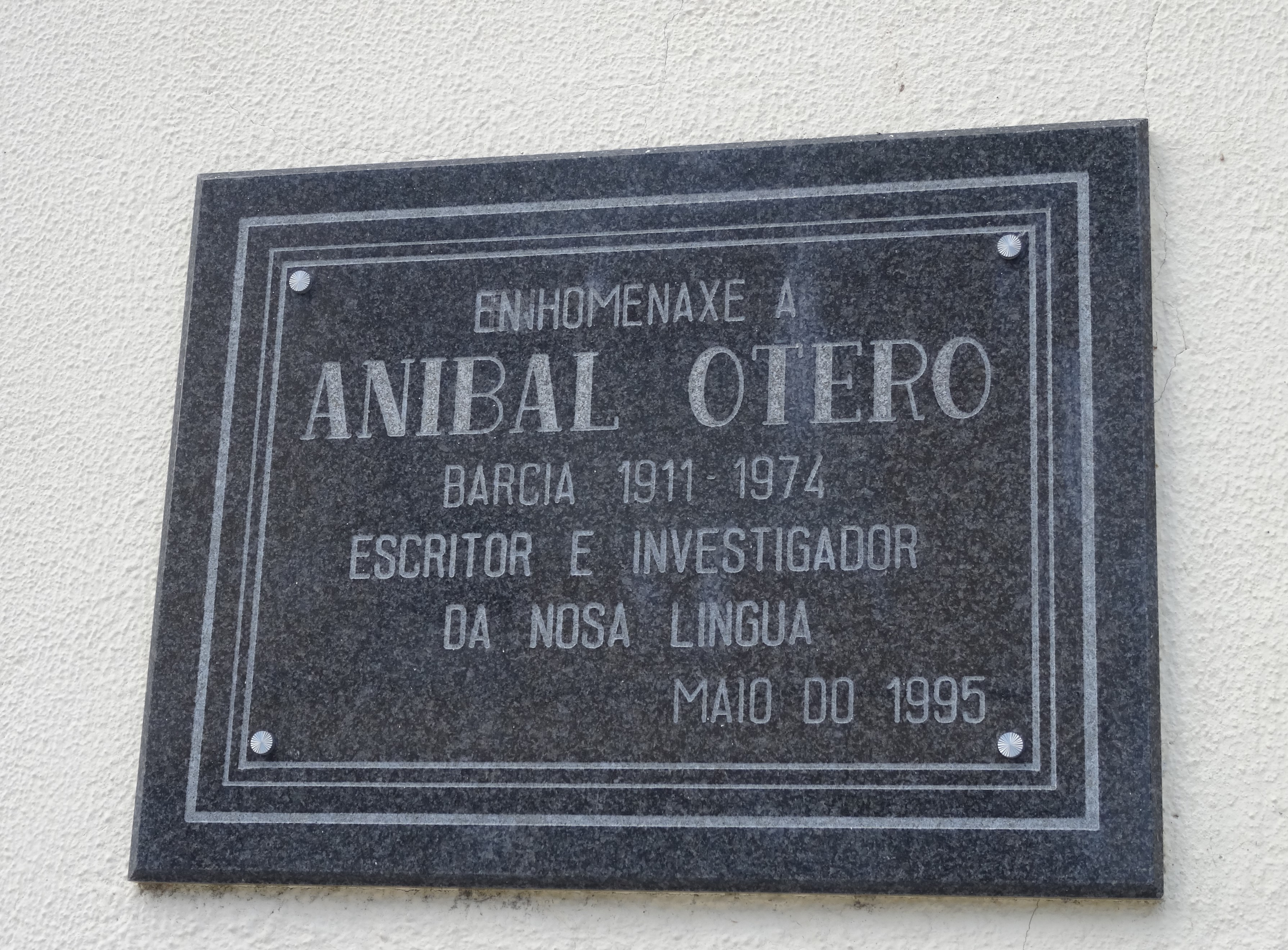
Commemorative plaque

=== Linguistics ===
- 1955 – "Hipótesis etimológicas referentes al gallego-portugués" in Cuadernos de Estudios Gallegos n°32 (1955)
- 1967 – Contribución al diccionario gallego.
- 1977 – Vocabulario de San Jorge de Piquín.

=== Literature ===
- 1994 – Esmoriz, autobiographic novel published posthumously
