= Linguistic Atlas of the Iberian Peninsula =

Project conceived by Ramón Menéndez Pidal

The Linguistic Atlas of the Iberian Peninsula (Spanish: Atlas Lingüístico de la península ibérica; ALPI) is a project aimed at creating a linguistic atlas of the Iberian Romance languages. It was conceived by Ramón Menéndez Pidal (1869–1968), directed by his student, Tomás Navarro Tomás, and notable in part for its long and troubled history which included being interrupted by the Spanish Civil War.

Navarro Tomás directed its work from the Center for Historic Studies, part of the Junta para la Ampliación de Estudios which was the precursor to the modern Spanish National Research Council. Three different teams of interviewers took on the job of collecting the data corresponding to hundreds of different questions in 527 survey points, generally small towns, previously selected in order to cover in the most complete way all the Romance-speaking areas of the Iberian Peninsula, Roussillon, and the Balearic Islands. Neither the Canary Islands, nor the Azores nor Madeira were included. The greater part of this survey work was realized between 1931 and 1936, and the rest was completed between 1947 and 1956. The material was published on the Internet, beginning in 2002.

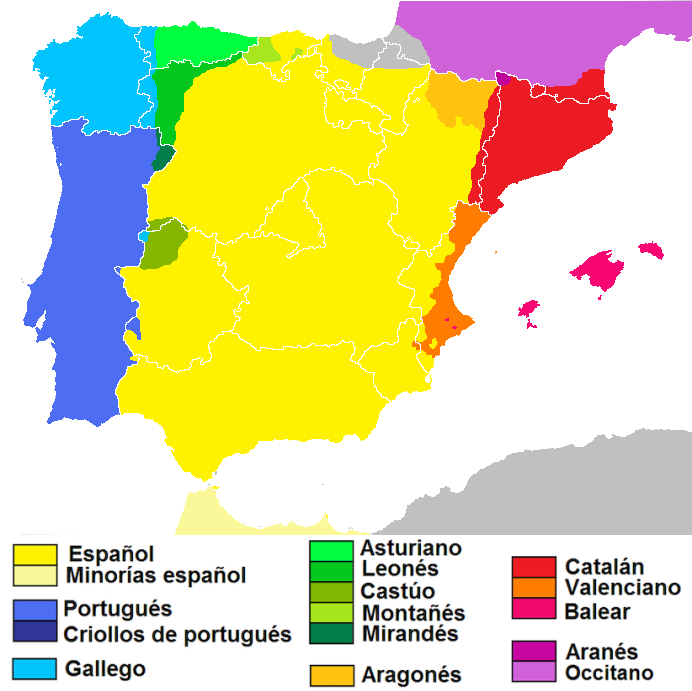
Color-coded map of the Iberian Romance languages, roughly as spoken in rural areas around the mid-20th century

The ALPI aimed at following the traditional methodology of the first linguistic atlases. In each survey point (town or village) two informants were typically chosen, one for the study of phonetics and morphosyntax and the other for the part involving lexicon. These informants were, in general, non-mobile older rural males, or NORMS, although the ALPI did interview a greater number of women informants than later linguistic atlases. By selecting informants with these characteristics, the linguists aimed at studying the most genuine traits of the popular speech of each location. The informants were asked to give the typical form in each place for a series of words and phrases, defined in the survey, and their answer was copied by way of phonetic transcription using the RFE Phonetic Alphabet.

The survey-takers were the following:

- Francesc de Borja Moll.
- Aurelio Macedonio Espinosa Jr.
- Luís Lindley Cintra, who was involved in the second phase of the surveying, substituting Armando Nobre de Gusmão in the Portuguese territory.
- Armando Nobre de Gusmão. Initially the Portuguese interviewer was to be Rodrigo de Sá Nogueira, but he abandoned the project short after starting and was replaced by Nobre de Gusmão, who realized the first phase of the interviews, but could not be involved after the Civil War due to sickness.
- Aníbal Otero.
- Lorenzo Rodríguez-Castellano.
- Manuel Sanchis i Guarner.

Following from the results of the surveys, the atlas proper was planned to be published, in 10 volumes, but only the first volume came to light.

== Mishaps ==
The linguistic interviews had to be interrupted due to the Spanish Civil War from 1936-39. Tomás Navarro Tomás had to go into exile, and he took with him the materials from the ALPI.

One of the interviewers, Aníbal Otero, was accused of spying by Polícia de Vigilância e Defesa do Estado of Estado Novo Portugal, apparently for the fact that he used phonetic transcription symbols in his survey notebooks, and was arrested, handed in to Francoist authorities, and condemned to death. Later the penalty was commuted, and he remained in prison until 1941.

In 1951 Tomás Navarro Tomás sent the materials to Spain, to the Spanish National Research Council, after making an agreement that the remaining interviews would be completed and the atlas would be published.

In 1962 the first volume out of ten planned was published, but immediately after the work was stopped, and no volumes have been published since. The survey notebooks remained stored in various public and private locations.

== Online publication ==
Starting in 1999, David Heap, professor at the University of Western Ontario, made photocopies of the notebooks and published them online (see External links). Then, in 2007, motivated by the centenary of the Junta para Ampliación de Estudios, the CSIC decided to publish the unpublished materials of the ALPI. This task was entrusted to Pilar García Mouton, research professor of the CSIC and specialist in geolinguistics. The team she works with is made up of Inés Fernández-Ordóñez (Autonomous University of Madrid), David Heap (University of Western Ontario), María Pilar Perea (University of Barcelona), João Saramago (Center of Linguistics of the University of Lisbon) and Xulio Sousa Fernández (Instituto da Lingua Galega of the University of Santiago de Compostela). In 2016 the online publication of the ALPI from the CSIC began.

The ALPI's web page presents the history of the project, describes its methodology and online publication, and includes easy access to data from the linguistic surveys. It also includes an image gallery, The website also describes in detail the steps of the current publishing process, the criteria followed, and includes a Publications section which gives access to the first volume of the ALPI (CSIC, 1962), to the studies related to the atlas published by its authors and those that have been published by the team that is currently working on its elaboration and digital publishing.

== Bibliography ==
- Águila Escobar, Gonzalo (2017). "Presente y futuro del Atlas Lingüístico de la Península Ibérica: de la versión impresa a la plataforma electrónica". La corónica: A Journal of Medieval Hispanic Languages, Literatures, and Cultures (in Spanish). 46 (1): 185–205. doi:10.1353/cor.2017.0029. S2CID 165688660.
- Álvarez Pérez, Xosé Afonso (1 December 2016). "Consideraciones sobre la imagen lingüística transmitida por los atlas tradicionales: el caso del Atlas Lingüístico de la Península Ibérica en Portugal". Géolinguistique (in Spanish) (16): 131–160. doi:10.4000/geolinguistique.528.
- Cortés, Santi (2009). La historia interna del Atlas Lingúístico de la Península Ibérica, ALPI: correspondencia, 1910-1976 (in Spanish) (Digital ed.). Valencia. ISBN 978-8437074788.
- Pérez Pascual, José Ignacio (31 December 2022). "Las encuestas del Atlas Lingüístico de la Península Ibérica en Galicia". Revista de Investigación Lingüística (in Spanish). 25: 155–183. doi:10.6018/ril.512431. hdl:2183/38084.
- Navarro Tomás, Tomás (1962). Atlas Lingüístico de la península ibérica, I: Fonética. Madrid: CSIC.
- Pérez Pascual, José Ignacio (2016). Los primeros pasos de un largo caminar. Los comienzos del "Atlas Lingüístico de la Península Ibérica" (in Spanish). ISBN 978-84-17107-64-2. Archived from the original on 12 March 2023.
- Viudas Camarasa, Antonio (2003) "El Atlas Lingüístico de la Península Ibérica y el dialectólogo Alonso Zamora Vicente", Actas del Congreso Internacional "La lengua, la Academia, lo Popular, los Clásicos, los Contemporáneos...", coord. por José Carlos Rovira Soler, Vol. 1, 2003, págs.285-300. ( Bienvenido a dialectus Archived 12 March 2023 at the Wayback Machine ).
