= History of the Spanish language =

The language known today as Spanish is derived from spoken Latin, which was brought to the Iberian Peninsula by the Romans after their occupation of the peninsula that started in the late 3rd century BC. Today it is the world's 4th most widely spoken language, after English, Mandarin Chinese and Hindi. Influenced by the peninsular hegemony of Al-Andalus in the early middle ages, Hispano-Romance varieties borrowed substantial lexicon from Arabic. Upon the southward territorial expansion of the Kingdom of Castile, Hispano-Romance norms associated to this polity displaced both Arabic and the Mozarabic romance varieties in the conquered territories, even though the resulting speech also assimilated features from the latter in the process. The first standard written norm of Spanish was brought forward in the 13th century by Alfonso X the Wise (who used Castilian, i.e. Spanish, along with Latin as languages of the administration), probably drawing from the speech of the upper classes of Toledo. Features associated with the Castilian patterns of Hispano-Romance also spread west and east to the kingdoms of León and Aragón for the rest of the middle ages, owing to the political prestige achieved by the Kingdom of Castile in the peninsular context and to the lesser literary development of their vernacular norms. From the 1560s onward the standard written form followed Madrid's.

The Spanish language expanded overseas in the Early Modern period in the wake of the Spanish conquests in the Americas (as well as the Canary Islands). Besides the Caribbean, the colonial administration in the new territories had its main centres of power located in Mexico City and Lima, which retained more features from the central peninsular norm than other more peripheral territories of the Spanish Empire, where adoption of patterns from the southern peninsular norm of Seville (the largest city of the Crown in the 16th century and the port linking to the Americas) was more pervasive, even though in other regards the influence from the latter norm (associated to Andalusian Spanish) came to be preponderant in the entire Americas. Spanish varieties henceforth borrowed influence from Amerindian languages, primarily coming from the Caribbean, the Central-Andean and Mesoamerican regions. Today it is the official language of 20 countries, as well as an official language of numerous international organizations, including the United Nations.

== Main distinguishing features ==
The development of Spanish phonology is distinguished from those of other nearby Romance languages (e.g. Portuguese, Catalan) by several features:

- diphthongization of Latin stressed short E and O in closed syllables as well as open (tiempo, puerta vs. Portuguese tempo, porta)
- devoicing and further development of the medieval Spanish sibilants, producing (1) the velar fricative [x] in words such as caja, hijo, gente, and (2)—in many dialects of Spain, including the prestige varieties of Madrid, Toledo, etc.—the interdental [θ] in words such as cinco, hacer, and lazo
- debuccalization and eventual loss of Latin initial /f/ in most contexts, marked in modern spelling by the silent ⟨h⟩ of words such as hablar, hilo, hoja (from Latin fabulare, filum, and folia respectively. Also in Gascon: hilh, huelha)
- early fricativization of palatal /ʎ/ (from Vulgar Latin -LJ-, -CL-, -GL-), first into palatal /ʒ/ and ultimately into velar /x/, e.g., filius →hijo, *oc'lu → ojo, *coag'lare → cuajar; cf. Portuguese filho, olho, coalhar)
- development of initial PL-, CL-, FL- into palatal /ʎ/ in many words, e.g., plorare → llorar, clamare → llamar, flamma → llama; cf. Portuguese chorar, chamar, chama, Catalan plorar, clamar, flama)
- Vulgar Latin initial /j/ (from J-, DJ-, G(E)-, G(I)-) remains before /a/, /e/ and /i/, subsequently disappearing in an unstressed syllable (iaceō→yace, gypsum→yeso, ienuārius→enero, *iectāre→echar, gelāre→helar, *genuclum→hinojo vs. Portuguese jaz, gesso, janeiro, jeitar, gelar, joelho)

The following features are characteristic of Spanish phonology and also of some other Ibero-Romance languages, but not the Romance languages as a whole:

- palatalization of Latin -NN- and -LL- into /ɲ/ and /ʎ/ (año, caballo) (also in Catalan: any, cavall).
- the phonemic merger of /b/ and /v/, making, for example, the noun tubo and the verb tuvo phonetically equivalent (in all contexts except those of hypercorrection or spelling pronunciation) (also in Galician, Northern European Portuguese and some Catalan and Occitan varieties)
- spirantization of /b/, /d/, and /ɡ/ → [β̞], [ð̞] and [ɣ̞]—not only from original Latin B, D, and G (as in Sp. probar, sudar, legumbre), but also from Latin *V, P, T, and C (as in Sp. tuvo, sabe, vida, lago) (also in Galician, European Portuguese, Catalan and parts of Occitan)

The Latin system of four verb conjugations (form classes) is reduced to three in Spanish. The Latin infinitives with the endings -ĀRE, -ĒRE, and -ĪRE become Spanish infinitives in -ar, -er, and -ir respectively. The Latin third conjugation—infinitives ending in -ĔRE—are redistributed between the Spanish -er and -ir classes (e.g. facere → hacer, dicere → decir). Spanish verbal morphology continues the use of some Latin synthetic forms that were replaced by analytic ones in spoken French and (partly) Italian (cf. Sp. lavó, Fr. il a lavé), and the Spanish subjunctive mood maintains separate present and past-tense forms.

Spanish syntax provides overt marking for some direct objects (the so-called "personal a", see differential object marking for the general phenomenon), and uses clitic doubling with indirect objects, in which a "redundant" pronoun (le, les) appears even in the presence of an explicit noun phrase. (Neither feature occurs in other Western Romance languages, but both are features of Romanian, with pe < PER corresponding to Spanish a.) With regard to subject pronouns, Spanish is a pro-drop language, meaning that the verb phrase can often stand alone without the use of a subject pronoun (or a subject noun phrase). In some cases, such as with impersonal verbs referring to meteorological (llover "to rain", nevar "to snow") or other natural phenomena (amanecer "to get light out", anochecer "to get dark out"), it is ungrammatical to include a subject. Compared to other Romance languages, Spanish has a somewhat freer syntax with relatively fewer restrictions on subject-verb-object word order.

Due to prolonged language contact with other languages, the Spanish lexicon contains loanwords from Basque, Hispano-Celtic (Celtiberian and Gallaecian), Iberian, Germanic (Gothic), Arabic and indigenous languages of the Americas.

Accents—used in Modern Spanish to mark the vowel of the stressed syllable in words where stress is not predictable from rules—came into use sporadically in the 15th century, and massively in the 16th century. Their use began to be standardized with the advent of the Spanish Royal Academy in the 18th century. See also Spanish orthography.

== External history ==
With the Reconquista in Iberia, various Vulgar Latin language groups ended up mixing (along with Basque). The largest such group was the Castilians, whose language became Spanish.

The standard Spanish language is also called Castilian in its original variant, and in order to distinguish it from other languages native to parts of Spain, such as Galician, Catalan, Basque, etc. In its earliest documented form, and up through approximately the 15th century, the language is customarily called Old Spanish. From approximately the 16th century on, it is called Modern Spanish. Spanish of the 16th and 17th centuries is sometimes called "classical" Spanish, referring to the literary accomplishments of that period. Unlike English and French, it is not customary to speak of a "middle" stage in the development of Spanish.

=== Origins ===
Castilian Spanish originated (after the decline of the Roman Empire) as a continuation of spoken Latin in several areas of northern and central Spain. Eventually, the variety spoken in the city of Toledo around the 13th century became the basis for the written standard. With the Reconquista, this northern dialect spread to the south, where it almost entirely replaced or absorbed the local Romance dialects, at the same time as it borrowed many words from Andalusi Arabic and was influenced by Mozarabic (the Romance speech of Christians living in Moorish territory) and medieval Judaeo-Spanish (Ladino). These languages had vanished in the Iberian Peninsula by the late 16th century.

The prestige of Castile and its language was propagated partly by the exploits of Castilian heroes in the battles of the Reconquista—among them Fernán González and Rodrigo Díaz de Vivar (El Cid)—and by the narrative poems about them that were recited in Castilian even outside the original territory of that dialect.

The "first written Spanish" was traditionally considered to have appeared in the Glosas Emilianenses located in San Millán de la Cogolla, La Rioja. These are "glosses" (translations of isolated words and phrases in a form more like Hispanic Romance than Latin) added between the lines of a manuscript that was written earlier in Latin. Nowadays the language of the Glosas Emilianenses is considered to be closer to the Navarro-Aragonese language than to Spanish proper. Estimates of their date vary from the late 10th to the early 11th century.

The first steps toward standardization of written Castilian were taken in the 13th century by King Alfonso X of Castile, known as Alfonso el Sabio (Alfonso the Wise), in his court in Toledo. He assembled scribes at his court and supervised their writing, in Castilian, of extensive works on history, astronomy, law, and other fields of knowledge.

Antonio de Nebrija wrote the first grammar of Spanish, Gramática de la lengua castellana, and presented it, in 1492, to Queen Isabella, who is said to have had an early appreciation of the usefulness of the language as a tool of hegemony, as if anticipating the empire that was about to be founded with the voyages of Columbus.

Because Old Spanish resembles the modern written language to a relatively high degree, a reader of Modern Spanish can learn to read medieval documents without much difficulty.

The Spanish Royal Academy was founded in 1713, largely with the purpose of standardizing the language. The Academy published its first dictionary in six volumes over the period 1726–1739, and its first grammar in 1771, and it continues to produce new editions of both from time to time. (The Academy's dictionary is now accessible on the Internet.) Today, each of the Spanish-speaking countries has an analogous language academy, and an Association of Spanish Language Academies was created in 1951.

=== America ===
Beginning in the late fifteenth century, the discovery and colonization of the Americas by Spanish colonizers brought the language across the Atlantic and to Mexico, Central America, and western and southern South America. Under the Spanish Crown, the language was used as a tool for colonization by Spanish soldiers, missionaries, conquistadors, and entrepreneurs. In the coming centuries, their descendants continued to spread the language.

Use of the language in the Americas was continued by descendants of the Spaniards: Spanish criollos and Mestizos. After the wars of independence fought by these colonies in the 19th century, the new ruling elites extended their Spanish to the whole population, including the Amerindian majority, to strengthen national unity, and nowadays it is the first and official language of the resulting republics, except in very isolated parts of the former Spanish colonies.

In the late 19th century, the still-Spanish colonies of Cuba and Puerto Rico encouraged more immigrants from Spain, and similarly other Spanish-speaking countries such as Argentina, Uruguay, and to a lesser extent Chile, Colombia, Mexico, Panama and Venezuela, attracted waves of European immigration, Spanish and non-Spanish, in the late 19th and early 20th centuries. There, the countries' large (or sizable minority) population groups of second- and third-generation descendants adopted the Spanish language as part of their governments' official assimilation policies to include Europeans. In some countries, they had to be Catholics and agreed to take an oath of allegiance to their chosen nation's government.

When Puerto Rico became a possession of the United States as a consequence of the Spanish–American War, its population—almost entirely of Spanish and mixed Afro-Caribbean/Spanish (mulatto and mestizo) descent—retained its inherited Spanish language as a mother tongue, in co-existence with the American-imposed English as co-official. In the 20th century, more than a million Puerto Ricans migrated to the mainland U.S. (see Puerto Ricans in the United States).

A similar situation occurred in the American Southwest, including California, Arizona, New Mexico and Texas, where Spaniards, then criollos (Tejanos, Californios, etc.) followed by Chicanos (Mexican Americans) and later Mexican immigrants, kept the Spanish language alive before, during and after the American appropriation of those territories following the Mexican–American War. Spanish continues to be used by millions of citizens and immigrants to the United States from Spanish-speaking countries of the Americas (for example, many Cubans arrived in Miami, Florida, beginning with the Cuban Revolution in 1959, and followed by other Latin American groups; the local majority is now Spanish-speaking). Spanish is now treated as the country's "second language," and over 5 percent of the U.S. population are Spanish-speaking, but most Latino/Hispanic Americans are bilingual or also regularly speak English.

=== Africa ===
The presence of Spanish in Equatorial Guinea dates from the late 18th century, and it was adopted as the official language when independence was granted in 1968.

Spanish is widely spoken in Western Sahara, which was a protectorate/colony of Spain from the 1880s to the 1970s.

=== Judaeo-Spanish ===
In 1492 Spain expelled its Jewish population. Their Judaeo-Spanish language, called Ladino, developed along its own lines and continues to be spoken by a dwindling number of speakers, mainly in Israel, Turkey, and Greece.

=== In the Pacific ===
In the Marianas, the Spanish language was retained until the Pacific War, but is no longer spoken there by any significant number of people. As part of Chile since 1888, Spanish is spoken by most people in Easter Island along with Rapa Nui language.

=== Spain ===
Language politics in Francoist Spain declared Spanish as the only official language in Spain, and to this day it is the most widely used language in government, business, public education, the workplace, cultural arts, and the media. But in the 1960s and 1970s, the Spanish parliament agreed to allow provinces to use, speak, and print official documents in three other languages: Catalan for Catalonia, Balearic Islands and Valencia; Basque for the Basque provinces and Navarre, and Galician for Galicia. Since 1975, following the death of Franco, Spain has become a multi-party democracy and decentralized country, constituted in autonomous communities. Under this system, some languages of Spain—such as Aranese (an Occitan language of northwestern Catalonia), Basque, Catalan/Valencian, and Galician—have gained co-official status in their respective geographical areas. Others—such as Aragonese, Asturian and Leonese—have been recognized by regional governments.

=== International projection ===
When the United Nations organization was founded in 1945, Spanish was designated one of its five official languages (along with Chinese, English, French, and Russian; a sixth language, Arabic, was added in 1973).

The list of Nobel laureates in Literature includes eleven authors who wrote in Spanish (José Echegaray, Jacinto Benavente, Gabriela Mistral, Juan Ramón Jiménez, Miguel Ángel Asturias, Pablo Neruda, Vicente Aleixandre, Gabriel García Márquez, Camilo José Cela, Octavio Paz, and Mario Vargas Llosa).

== Influences ==
The mention of "influences" on the Spanish language refers primarily to lexical borrowing. Throughout its history, Spanish has accepted loanwords, first from pre-Roman languages (including Basque, Iberian, Celtiberian and Gallaecian), and later from Greek, from Germanic languages, from Arabic, from neighboring Romance languages, from Native American languages, and from English.

The most frequently used word that entered Spanish from (or through) Basque is izquierda "left". Basque is perhaps most evident in some common Spanish surnames, including García and Echeverría. Basque place names also are prominent throughout Spain, because many Castilians who took part in the Reconquista and repopulation of Moorish Iberia by Christians were of Basque lineage. Iberian and Celtiberian likewise are thought to have contributed place names to Spain. Words of everyday use that are attributed to Celtic sources include camino "road", carro "cart", colmena "hive", and cerveza "beer". Suffixes such as -iego: mujeriego "womanizer" and -ego: gallego "Galician" are also attributed to Celtic sources.

Influence of Basque phonology is credited by some researchers with softening the Spanish labiodentals: turning labiodental [v] to bilabial [β], and ultimately deleting labiodental [f]. Others negate or downplay Basque phonological influence, claiming that these changes occurred in the affected dialects wholly as a result of factors internal to the language, not outside influence. It is also possible that the two forces, internal and external, worked in concert and reinforced each other.

Some words of Greek origin were already present in the spoken Latin that became Spanish. Additionally, many Greek words formed part of the language of the Church. Spanish also borrowed Ancient Greek vocabulary in the areas of medical, technical, and scientific language, beginning as early as the 13th century.

The influence of Germanic languages is very little on phonological development, but rather is found mainly in the Spanish lexicon. Words of Germanic origin are common in all varieties of Spanish. The modern words for the cardinal directions (norte, este, sur, oeste), for example, are all taken from Germanic words (compare north, east, south and west in Modern English), after contact with Atlantic sailors. These words did not exist in Spanish prior to the 15th century. Instead, "north" and "south" were septentrion and meridion respectively (both virtually obsolete in Modern Spanish as nouns, unlike their not uncommon adjectival counterparts septentrional and meridional), while "east" was oriente (or levante), and "west" was occidente (or poniente). These older words for "east" and "west" continue to have some use in Modern Spanish.

In 711 the Iberian Peninsula was conquered by Moors, who brought in the Arabic language. For about eight hundred years, until the fall of the Emirate of Granada (1492), Spanish borrowed thousands of words from Andalusi Arabic and Andalusi Romance, such as alcalde "mayor", álgebra "algebra", aceite "oil", zanahoria "carrot", alquiler "rent", achacar "to blame", adelfa "oleander", barrio "neighbourhood", chaleco "vest", to name just a few; making up 8% of the Spanish dictionary—the second largest lexical influence on Spanish after Latin. It is thought that the bilingualism of the Mozarabs facilitated the large transfer of vocabulary from Arabic to Castilian.

The neighboring Romance languages—such as Andalusi Romance, Galician/Portuguese, Catalan, French, and Occitan—contributed greatly to the Spanish lexicon throughout the Middle Ages and into the modern era. Borrowing from Italian occurred most frequently in the 16th and 17th centuries, due largely to the influence of the Italian Renaissance.

The creation of the Spanish Empire in the New World led to lexical borrowing from indigenous languages of the Americas, especially vocabulary dealing with flora, fauna, and cultural concepts unique to the Americas.

Borrowing from English has become especially strong, beginning in the 20th century, with words borrowed from many fields of activity, including sports, technology, and commerce.

The incorporation into Spanish of learned, or "bookish" words from its own ancestor language, Latin, is arguably another form of lexical borrowing through the influence of written language and the liturgical language of the Church. Throughout the Middle Ages and into the early modern period, most literate Spanish-speakers were also literate in Latin; and thus they easily adopted Latin words into their writing—and eventually speech—in Spanish. The form of Latin that Spaniards spoke and the loanwords came from was Classical Latin, but also Renaissance Latin, the form of Latin used in original works of the time.

== Internal history ==
Spanish shares with other Romance languages most of the phonological and grammatical changes that characterized Vulgar Latin, such as the abandonment of distinctive vowel length, the loss of the case system for nouns, and the loss of deponent verbs.

=== Syncope ===
Syncope in the history of Spanish refers to the loss of an unstressed vowel from the syllable immediately preceding or following the stressed syllable. Early in its history, Spanish lost such vowels where they preceded or followed R or L, and between S and T.

Early syncope in Spanish
Environment	Latin words	Spanish words
_r	aperīre, humerum, litteram, operam, honorāre	abrir, hombro, letra, obra, honrar
r_	eremum, viridem	yermo, verde
_l	acūculam, fabulam, insulam, populum	aguja, habla, isla, pueblo
l_	sōlitārium	soltero
s_t	positum, consūtūram	puesto, costura

*Solitario, which is derived from sōlitārium, is a learned word; cf. the alternate form soltero. As also fábula from fabulam, although this last one has a different meaning in Spanish.

Later, after the time of intervocalic voicing, unstressed vowels were lost between other combinations of consonants:

Later syncope in Spanish
Environment	Latin words	Spanish words
b_t	cubitum, dēbitam, dūbitam	codo, deuda, duda
c_m, c_p, c_t	decimum, acceptōre, recitāre	diezmo, azor, rezar
d_c	undecim, vindicāre	once, vengar
f_c	advērificāre	averiguar
m_c, m_n, m_t	hāmiceolum, hominem, comitem	anzuelo, hombre, conde
n_c, n_t	dominicum, bonitāte, cuminitiāre	domingo, bondad, comenzar
p_t	capitālem, computāre, hospitālem	caudal, contar, hostal
s_c, s_n	quassicāre, rassicāre, asinum, fraxinum	cascar, rascar, asno, fresno
t_c, t_n	masticāre, portaticum, trīticum, retinam	mascar/masticar, portazgo, trigo, rienda

Words capital, computar, hospital, recitar and vindicar are learned words; cf. capitālem, computāre, hospitālem, recitāre and vindicāre and alternate forms caudal, contar, hostal, rezar and vengar.

=== Elision ===
While voiceless intervocalic consonants regularly became voiced, many voiced intervocalic stops (d, g, and occasionally b) were dropped from words altogether through a process called elision. Latin /b/ between vowels usually changed to /v/ in Old Spanish (e.g. habēre > aver), while Latin /p/ became /b/ (sapere > saber). In modern times the two phonemes merged into /b/ (haber, saber), realized as [β] between vowels (see Betacism). Latin voiced stops—/b/, /d/, and /ɡ/, which are represented orthographically as B, D, and G respectively—and also occurred in intervocalic positions also underwent lenition: [β], [ð], and [ɣ], but appeared in Spanish also through learned words from Classical Latin.

Examples of elision in Spanish
Consonant	Latin word	Spanish word
b → ∅	vendēbat	vendía
d → ∅	comedere, vidēre, hodie, cadēre, pede, quō modō	comer, ver, hoy, caer, pie, cómo
g → ∅	cōgitāre, digitum, legere, ligāre, lēgāle	cuidar, dedo, leer, liar, leal

Many forms with d and g preserved, e.g. ligar, legal, dígito, crudo, are learned words (Latinisms); cf. the alternate forms liar, leal, dedo and Old Spanish cruo and its Latin origin crūdus.

An exemption to the rule: The retention of the d and g is due to the invalidity of the -ao, -aa, -oo, and -oa hiatuses in Old Spanish that would result from dropping it.

Consonant	Latin word	Spanish word
d → [ð]	gradus, vadum, modus	grado, vado, modo
g → [ɣ]	sparagus, agustus, plāga, magus	espárrago, agosto, llaga, mago

=== Voicing and spirantization ===
In virtually all the Western Romance languages, the Latin voiceless stops—/p/, /t/, and /k/, which are represented orthographically as P, T, and C (including Q) respectively—where they occurred in an "intervocalic" environment (qualified below), underwent one, two, or three successive stages of lenition, from voicing to spirantization to, in some cases, elision (deletion). In Spanish these three consonants generally undergo both voicing and spirantization, resulting in voiced fricatives: [β], [ð], and [ɣ], respectively. Although it was once speculated that this change came about as a transfer of phonological features from substrate Celtic and Basque languages, which were in geographical proximity to Iberian Vulgar Latin (see Sprachbund), it is now widely recognized that such change is a natural internal development. Intervocalic /p/, /t/, and /k/ reappeared in Spanish through learned words from Classical Latin and also appeared in Spanish through consonant cluster simplification from Vulgar Latin (see below), and Latin voiced stops—/b/, /d/, and /ɡ/, which are represented orthographically as B, D, and G respectively—and also occurred in intervocalic positions also underwent lenition: [β], [ð], and [ɣ], but appeared in Spanish also through learned words from Classical Latin and also appeared in Spanish through consonant cluster simplification from Vulgar Latin.

The phonological environment of these changes is not only between vowels but also after a vowel and before a sonorant consonant such as /r/ (Latin patrem > Spanish padre)—but not the reverse (Latin partem > Spanish parte, not *parde).

Examples of voicing and spirantization in Spanish
Consonants	Latin word	Spanish word
p → b [β]	aperīre, cooperīre, lupum, operam, populum, capram, superāre^{1}	abrir [aˈβɾir], cubrir [kuˈβɾir], lobo [ˈloβo], obra [ˈoβɾa], pueblo [ˈpweβlo], cabra [ˈkaβɾa], sobrar [soβˈɾar]
t → d [ð]	cīvitātem, cubitum, latum, mūtāre, scūtum, stātus, petram	ciudad [θjuˈðað], codo [ˈkoðo], lado [ˈlaðo], mudar [muˈðar], escudo [esˈkuðo], estado [esˈtaðo], piedra [ˈpjeðra]
c → g [ɣ]	focum, lacum, locum, pacāre, sacrātum, aqua, lucrum^{2}	fuego [ˈfweɣo], lago [ˈlaɣo], luego [ˈlweɣo], pagar [paˈɣar], sagrado [saˈɣɾaðo], agua [ˈaɣwa], logro [ˈloɣɾo]

^{1}Latin superāre produced both sobrar and its learned doublet superar.

^{2}Latin lucrum produced both logro and its learned doublet lucro.

The verb decir, in its various conjugated forms, exemplifies different phonetic changes, depending on whether the letter <c> (Latin /k/) was followed by a front vowel or not. The Latin /k/ changes ultimately to Spanish /θ/ when followed by the front vowels (/i/ or /e/—thus dice, decimos, etc.), but in other forms, before a back vowel, /k/ is voiced to /ɡ/ and, in the modern language, realized as a spirant [ɣ] (as in digo, diga). This also is the pattern of a few other Spanish verbs ending in -cer or -cir, as in the table below:

Forms with /k/ → /θ/,/s/ (before front vowels)			Forms with /k/ → /ɡ/ (before back vowels)		
English	Latin	Spanish	English	Latin	Spanish
To say, to tell It says, it tells	dīcere /ˈdiːkere/ dīcit /ˈdiːkit/	decir /deˈθiɾ/,/deˈsiɾ/ dice /ˈdiθe/,/ˈdise/	I say, I tell May it tell	dīcō /ˈdiːkoː/ dīcat /ˈdiːkat/	digo /ˈdiɡo/ diga /ˈdiɡa/
To do, to make It does, it makes	facere /ˈfakere/ facit /ˈfakit/	hacer /aˈθeɾ/,/aˈseɾ/ hace /ˈaθe/,/ˈase/	I do, I make May it make	faciō > *facō /ˈfakoː/ faciat > *facat /ˈfakat/	hago /ˈaɡo/ haga /ˈaɡa/

=== Vowel raising ===
Stressed vowels were raised when followed by [j] in the same or next syllable (except when the [j] had fused with earlier preceding /t/ or /k/, e.g. fortia → fuerza with diphthongization). This blocked the later process of diphthongization.

Examples of raising in Spanish
Change	Latin	Spanish	Change	Latin	Spanish
/e/ → /i/	vitreum, vindēmia	vidrio, vendimia	/o/ → /u/	lucta *[loi̯ta]	lucha
/a, ɛ/ → /e/	bāsium, praemium	beso, premio	/ɔ/ → /o/	octō *[ɔi̯to]	ocho

=== Apocope of -e ===
A word-final unstressed /e/ is lost when following a dental or alveolar consonant other than /t/ and preceded by a vowel. This happened after the voicing described above, as e.g. parietem → pared.

Examples of apocope of -e in Spanish
Latin	Spanish	Latin	Spanish
parietem	pared	mercēdem	merced
pānem	pan	mare	mar
fidēlem	fiel	mēnsem	mes
pācem	paz		

=== Diphthongization in open and closed syllables ===
It is commonly thought that the reflexes of stressed short E and O of Latin were realised, after the loss of phonemic quantity, as the low-mid vowels /ɛ/ and /ɔ/ respectively in the Western Romance languages, contrasting with close-mid /e/ and /o/, which would have originated from the mergers between long E and short I and between long O and short U, respectively; this change would explain the similarity of the vowel systems in modern Romance languages such as Portuguese, Catalan and Italian. These low-mid vowels subsequently would have undergone diphthongization in many of the Western Romance languages. In Spanish this change occurs regardless of syllable shape (open or closed), in contrast to French and Italian, where it takes place only in open syllables, and in greater contrast to Portuguese where this diphthongization does not occur at all. As a result, Spanish phonology exhibits a five-vowel system, not the seven-vowel system that is typical of many other Western Romance languages. The stressed short [e] and [o] reappeared in Spanish through learned words from Classical Latin and also evolved from short vowels /i/ and /u/ from Vulgar Latin, and was retained from long vowels [eː] and [oː] from Vulgar Latin.

Spanish diphthongization in open and closed syllables
Syllable shape	Latin	Spanish	French	Italian	Portuguese	Catalan
Open	petram, focus	piedra, fuego	pierre, feu	pietra, fuoco	pedra, fogo	pedra, foc
Closed	festa, porta	fiesta, puerta	fête, porte	festa, porta	festa, porta	festa, porta

Diphthongized /ie/ and /ue/ were sometimes later monophthongized to /i/ and /e/ respectively. In the case of /ie/ this always happened when followed by /ʎ/. It was also common in /ue/ when it was preceded by /ɾ/ or /l/.

Examples of monophthongization in Spanish
/ie/ → /i/			/ue/ → /e/		
Latin	Old Spanish	Spanish	Latin	Old Spanish	Spanish
castellum	castiello	castillo	frontem	fruente	frente
cultellum	cuchiello	cuchillo	colobram	culuebra	culebra

=== Learned words and consonant cluster simplification ===
Learned words—that is, "bookish" words transmitted partly through writing and thus affected by their Latin form—became increasingly frequent with the works of Alfonso X in the mid-to-late 13th century. Many of these words contained consonant clusters which, in oral transmission, had been reduced to simpler consonant clusters or single consonants in previous centuries. This same process affected many of these new, more academic, words, especially when the words extended into popular usage in the Old Spanish period. Some of the consonant clusters affected were -ct-, -ct[i]-, -pt-, -gn-, -mn-, -mpt-, and -nct-. Most of the simplified forms have since reverted to the learned forms or are now considered to be uneducated.

Reduction of consonant clusters
Consonant cluster	Latin form	Learned form	Old Spanish form	Modern Spanish form
ct → t	effectum, perfectum, respectum, aspectum, dīstrīctus, sectam	efecto, perfecto, respecto, aspecto, districto, secta	efeto, perfeto, respeto, aspeto, distrito, seta	efecto, perfecto, respeto/respecto, aspecto, distrito, secta
ct[i] → cc[i] → c[i]	affectiōnem, lectiōnem, perfectiōnem	affección, lección, perfección	afición, lición, perfeción	afición/afección, lección, perfección
pt → t	acceptāre, baptismum, conceptum, raptus	aceptar, baptismo, concepto, rapto	acetar, bautismo, conceto, rato	aceptar, bautismo, concepto, rato
gn → n	dīgnum, magnīficum, signīficāre	digno, magnífico, significar	dino, manífigo, sinifigar	digno, magnífico, significar
mn → n	columnam, solemnitātem, alūmnus	columna, solemnidad, alumno	coluna, solenidad, aluno	columna, solemnidad, alumno
mpt → nt	promptum, exemptum	prompto, exempto	pronto, exento	pronto, exento
nct → nt	sanctus, distīnctum	sancto, distincto	santo, distinto	santo, distinto

Most of these words have modern forms which more closely resemble Latin than Old Spanish. In Old Spanish, the simplified forms were acceptable forms which were in coexistence (and sometimes competition) with the learned forms. The Spanish educational system, and later the Real Academia Española, with their demand that all consonants of a word be pronounced, steadily drove most simplified forms from existence. Many of the simplified forms were used in literary works in the Middle Ages and Renaissance (sometimes intentionally as an archaism), but have since been relegated mostly to popular and uneducated speech. Occasionally, both forms exist in Modern Spanish with different meanings or in idiomatic usage: for example afición is a "fondness (of)" or "taste (for)", while afección is "illness"; Modern Spanish respeto is "(attitude of) respect", while con respecto a means "with regard to".

Most words with consonant clusters in syllable-final position are loanwords from Classical Latin, examples are: transporte [tɾansˈpor.te], transmitir [tɾanz.miˈtir], instalar [ins.taˈlar], constante [konsˈtante], obstante [oβsˈtante], obstruir [oβsˈtɾwir], perspectiva [pers.pekˈti.βa], istmo [ˈist.mo]. A syllable-final position cannot be more than one consonant (one of n, r, l, s or z) in most (or all) dialects in colloquial speech, reflecting Vulgar Latin background. Realizations like [tɾasˈpor.te], [tɾaz.miˈtir], [is.taˈlar], [kosˈtante], [osˈtante], [osˈtɾwir], and [ˈiz.mo] are very common, and in many cases, they are considered acceptable even in formal speech.

Another type of consonant cluster simplification involves "double" (geminate) plosives that reduced to single: -pp-, -tt-, -cc-, -bb-, -dd-, -gg- /pː, tː, kː, bː, dː, gː/ > -p-, -t-, -c-, -b-, -d-, -g- /p, t, k, b, d, g/. The simplified Spanish outcomes of the Latin voiced series -bb-, -dd-, -gg- /bː, dː, gː/ remain voiced, inducing phonemic merger with intervocalic /b/, /d/, /g/ that issued from voicing of Latin /p/, /t/, /k/, so that all are subject to the same phonetic realization as voiced fricatives: [β], [ð], and [ɣ], respectively.

Simplification of double plosives in Spanish
Consonant	Latin word	Spanish word
bb [bː] → b [β]	ABBĀTEM	abad
dd [dː] → d [ð]	IN + ADDERE, ADDICTUS, ADDICTIŌNEM	añadir, adicto, adicción
gg [gː] → g [ɣ]	AGGRAVARE	agravar
pp [pː] → p [p]	CUPPAM, CIPPUS, VAPPA, SUPPORTĀRE, SUPPŌNĒRE	copa, cepo, guapo, soportar, suponer
tt [tː] → t [t]	CATTUM, GUTTAM, QUATTUOR, LITTERAM, ATTENDĒRE, ATTRAHERE, ATTRIBUERE, RATTUS	gato, gota, cuatro, letra, atender, atraer, atrever, rata
cc [kː] → c [k]	VACCAM, PECCĀRE, SICCUS, ACCŪSĀRE, OCCURRERE, BUCCAM	vaca, pecar, seco, acusar, ocurrir, boca

=== Vocalization ===
The term "vocalization" refers to the change from a consonant to the vowel-like sound of a glide. Some syllable-final consonants, regardless of whether they were already syllable-final in Latin or brought into that position by syncope, became glides. Labials (b, p, v) yielded the rounded glide [w] (which was in turn absorbed by a preceding round vowel), while the velar c ([k]) produced the palatal glide [j] (which could palatalize a following [t] and be absorbed by the resulting palatal affricate). (The forms debda, cobdo, and dubdar are documented in Old Spanish; but the hypothetical forms *oito and *noite had already given way to ocho and noche by the time Castilian became a written language.)

Syllable-final vocalization
Change	Latin word	Intermediate form	Spanish word
p → w	baptistam, capitālem	(none for baptistam), cabdal	bautista, caudal
b → w	dēbitam	debda	deuda
(u)b → w → Ø	cubitum, dubitāre	cobdo, dubdar	codo, dudar
v → w	cīvitātem	cibdad	ciudad
ct → ch	octō, nōctem	*oito, *noite	ocho, noche

=== Betacism ===
Most Romance languages have maintained the distinction between a phoneme /b/ and a phoneme /v/: a voiced bilabial stop and a voiced, usually labiodental, fricative, respectively. Instances of the /b/ phoneme could be inherited directly from Latin /b/ (unless between vowels), or they could result from the voicing of Latin /p/ between vowels. The /v/ phoneme was generally derived either from an allophone of Latin /b/ between vowels or from the Latin phoneme corresponding to the letter ⟨v⟩ (pronounced [w] in Classical Latin but later fortified to the status of a fricative consonant in Vulgar Latin). In most Romance-speaking regions, /v/ had labiodental articulation, but in Old Spanish, which still distinguished /b/ and /v/, the latter was probably realized as a bilabial fricative [β]. The contrast between the two phonemes was neutralized in certain environments, as the fricative [β] also occurred as an allophone of /b/ between vowels, after a vowel, and after certain consonants in Old Spanish. The similarity between the stop [b] and fricative [β] resulted in their complete merger by the end of the Old Spanish period (16th century). In Modern Spanish, the letters ⟨b⟩ and ⟨v⟩ represent the same phoneme (usually treated as /b/ in phonemic transcription), which is generally realized as the fricative [β] except when utterance-initial or after a nasal consonant, when it is realized as the stop [b]. The same situation prevails in Northern Portuguese and in Galician, but the other Portuguese dialects maintain the distinction. The merger of /b/ and /v/ also occurs in Standard Catalan in eastern Catalonia, but the distinction is retained in most varieties of Valencian and in some areas in southern Catalonia, in the Balearic dialect, as well as in Algherese.

In Modern Spanish, from the 16th century onward, the choice of orthographic ⟨b⟩ or ⟨v⟩ depends mainly on the etymology of the word. The orthography attempts to mimic the Latin spelling, rather than to keep the pronunciation-based spelling of Old Spanish. Thus, Old Spanish bever "to drink", bivir/vivir "to live" become beber, vivir, respectively, following the Latin spelling bibere, vīvere. The Spanish placename Córdoba, often spelled Cordova in Old Spanish (the spelling that prevailed in English until the 20th century), now reflects the spelling used by the city's Roman founders, Corduba.

=== Latin f- to Spanish h- to null ===
F was almost always initial in Latin words, and in Spanish most phonemes /f/ followed by a simple vowel passed through a stage in which the consonant eventually developed to [h] and then was lost phonologically. Spelling conventions have grapheme ⟨h⟩ used in words such as humo "smoke", hormiga "ant", hígado "liver" (compare Italian fumo, formica, fegato, with /f/ intact), but in terms of both structure and pronunciation, the initial consonant has been lost: /ˈumo/, /orˈmiɡa/, /ˈiɡado/. It is thought that ⟨f⟩ represented the labiodental [f] in Latin, which underwent a series of lenitions to become, successively, bilabial [ɸ] and then glottal [h] (hence the modern spelling), and it was then lost altogether in most varieties; ⟨h⟩ is assumed to have been "silent" in Vulgar Latin. The first written evidence of the process dates from 863, when the Latin name Forticius was written as Ortiço, which might have been pronounced with initial [h] but certainly not [f]. (The same name appears as Hortiço in a document from 927.) The replacement of ⟨f⟩ by ⟨h⟩ in spelling is not frequent before the 16th century, but that is thought not to reflect preservation of /f/. Rather, ⟨f⟩ was consistently used to represent /h/ until the phoneme /f/ reappeared in the language (around the 16th century, as a result of loanwords from Classical Latin). Then, it became necessary to distinguish both phonemes in spelling.

The change from /f/ to /h/ occurred in the Romance speech of Old Castile, eastern Asturian, and Gascon, but nowhere else nearby. Since much of this area was historically bilingual with Basque, and Basque once had [h] but no [f], it is often suggested that the change was caused by Basque influence. However, this is contested by many linguists.

Most current instances of /f/ are either learned words (those influenced by their written Latin form, such as forma, falso, fama, feria), loanwords of Arabic and Greek origin, or words whose initial ⟨f⟩ in Old Spanish is followed by a non-vowel (⟨r⟩, ⟨l⟩, or the glide element of a diphthong), as in frente, flor, fiesta, fuerte. That, along with the effect of preservation of /f/ regionally (Asturian fumu "smoke", formiga "ant", fégadu "liver"), accounts for modern doublets such as Fernando (learned) and Hernando (inherited) (both Spanish for "Ferdinand"), fierro (regional) and hierro (both "iron"), fastidio and hastío (both Spanish for "boredom"), and fondo and hondo (fondo means "bottom" and hondo means "deep"). Also, hacer ("to make") is the root word of satisfacer ("to satisfy"), and hecho ("made") is the root word of satisfecho ("satisfied") (cf. malhechor and fechorías).

As mentioned above, /h/ was not lost in all varieties. As of the late 20th century, word-initial ⟨h⟩ was pronounced as an /h/ in lower-class, predominantly rural speech in a number of western regions of Spain, specifically western Andalusia and Extremadura, the Canary Islands, part of western Salamanca, part of Cantabria, a northeastern area in León, and in the Asturian language as spoken in eastern Asturias, as well as in much of Latin America, where it similarly tends to be confined to lower-class and rural speech. The distribution of this pronunciation throughout so much of western Spain suggests that its spread was due in large part to the role of eastern Asturians in the reconquest of these zones. At least in Latin America, the Canaries, Andalusia, and Extremadura, this /h/ is merged with the phoneme /x~h/, which comes from medieval /ʃ/ and /ʒ/.

Examples of Latin 'f-' to Spanish 'h-'
Consonants	Latin word	Old Spanish form	Modern Spanish word
f- → h-	fabulāri, facere, faciendam, factum, faminem, farīnam, fēminam, fīcatum, fīlium, folia, fōrmōsum, fūmum, fungum, furcam	fablar, fazer, fazienda, feito, fambre, farina, fembra, fígado, fijo, foja, formoso, fumo, fongo, forca	hablar, hacer, hacienda, hecho, hambre, harina, hembra, hígado, hijo, hoja, hermoso, humo, hongo, horca

Fabulāri is translated as "make stories", opposed to its Spanish derivative hablar which means "speak" or "to talk".

=== Silent Latin h- ===
'H' is originally pronounced in Classical Latin, but became silent in Vulgar Latin. Thus, words were spelled without any such consonant in Old Spanish; in Early Modern Spanish, from the 16th century onward, it attempts to mimic the Latin spelling rather than continue Old Spanish orthography.

Examples
Consonants	Latin word	Old Spanish form	Modern Spanish word
h- → ∅ → h-	habēbat, habēre, habuī, hodiē, hominem, honorāre, hospitālem, humerum	avié; aver; ove; oy; omne, omre, ombre; onrar; ostal; ombro	había, haber, hube, hoy, hombre, honrar, hostal/hospital, hombro

=== Modern development of the Old Spanish sibilants ===
During the 16th century, the three voiced sibilant phonemes—dental /d͡z/, apico-alveolar /z/, and palato-alveolar /ʒ/ (as in Old Spanish fazer, casa, and ojo, respectively) lost their voicing and merged with their voiceless counterparts: /t͡s/, /s/, and /ʃ/ (as in caçar, passar, and baxar respectively). The character ⟨ç⟩, called ⟨c⟩ cedilla, originated in Old Spanish but has been replaced by ⟨z⟩ in the modern language.

Additionally, the affricate /t͡s/ lost its stop component, to become a laminodental fricative, [s̪]. As a result, the sound system then contained two sibilant fricative phonemes whose contrast depended entirely on a subtle distinction between their places of articulation: apicoalveolar, in the case of the /s/, and laminodental, in the case of the new fricative sibilant /s̪/, which was derived from the affricate /t͡s/. The distinction between the sounds grew in the dialects of northern and central Spain by paradigmatic dissimilation, but dialects in Andalusia and the Americas merged both sounds.

The dissimilation in the northern and central dialects occurred with the laminodental fricative moving forward to an interdental place of articulation, losing its sibilance to become [θ]. The sound is represented in modern spelling by ⟨c⟩ before ⟨e⟩ or ⟨i⟩ and by ⟨z⟩ elsewhere. In the south of Spain, the deaffrication of /t͡s/ resulted in a direct merger with /s/, as both were homorganic, and the new phoneme became either laminodental [s̪] ("seseo", in the Americas and parts of Andalusia) or [θ] ("ceceo", in a few parts of Andalusia). In general, coastal regions of Andalusia preferred [θ], and more inland regions preferred [s̪] (see the map at ceceo).

During the colonization of the Americas, most settlers came from the south of Spain; that is the cause, according to almost all scholars, for nearly all Spanish speakers in the New World still speaking a language variety derived mainly from the Western Andalusian and Canarian dialects.

Meanwhile, the alveopalatal fricative /ʃ/, the result of the merger of voiceless /ʃ/ (spelled ⟨x⟩ in Old Spanish) with voiced /ʒ/ (spelled with ⟨j⟩ in some words and in others with ⟨g⟩ before ⟨e⟩ or ⟨i⟩), was moved backward in all dialects, to become (depending on geographical variety) velar [x], uvular [χ] (in parts of Spain) or glottal [h] (in Andalusia, Canary Islands, and parts of the Americas, especially the Caribbean region).

=== Interchange of the liquids /l/ and /r/ ===
One unusual feature of Spanish etymology is the way in which the liquids /r/ and /l/ have sometimes replaced each other in words derived from Latin, French and other sources. For example, Spanish milagro, "miracle", is derived from Latin miraculum. More rarely, this process has involved consonants like /d/ and /n/ (as in alma, from Latin anima). Here is an incomplete list of such words:

- ancla, "anchor", Latin ancora
- albedrío, "will, whim, fancy", Latin arbitrium, "judgment, decision, will" (arbitrio is a learned form, i.e.: loanword from Classical Latin)
- algalia, "catheter", Ancient Greek: ἐργαλεία ergaleía, "tools"
- alimaña, "pest", almaje "livestock", Latin animalĭa, "animals"
- alma, "soul", Latin anima
- alondra, "lark", Latin alaudula
- altramuz, "lupin", Hispanic Arabic at-tarmūs
- árbol, "tree", Latin arbor
- Argelia, "Algeria (nation)"
- azufre, sulfur, Latin sulphur
- azul, "blue", Arabic: لازورد lāzaward "lapis lazuli" (cf. medieval Latin azura, French azure)
- blandir, "to brandish", French brandir
- bolsa, "bag, purse", Latin bursa
- cárcel, "prison", Latin carcer (cf. English "incarcerate")
- calambre, "cramp, electric shock", French crampe
- Catalina, Latin Catharina (proper name; Catarina is a learned form; i.e. loanword from Classical Latin)
- chaflán, "chamfer", French chanfrein.
- cilantro, "coriander", Latin coriandrum
- cimbrar, "shake (a stick), sway, swish", Latin cymula, "sprout, shoot (of plant)"
- corcel, "steed, fast horse", French corsier
- coronel, "colonel", French colonel, from Italian colonnello
- Cristóbal, Germanic Christoffer, from Latin Christopherus (proper name)
- cuartel, "quarter", French quartier
- dintel, "lintel", Old French lintel
- escolta, "escort", Italian scorta
- espuela, "spur", Gothic *spaúra (cf. French éperon)
- estiércol, "dung", Latin, stercus (stem stercor-)
- estrella, "star", from Latin stella (cf. Italian stella, French étoile)
- flete, "freight, cargo", French fret
- fraile, "friar", Provençal fraire, from Latin frater, "brother"
- franela, "flannel", French flanelle
- frasco, "flask", Germanic flasko
- guirnalda, "garland", older Spanish guirlanda, cf. French guirlande
- golondrina, "swallow (bird)", Latin hirundo
- lirio, "lily, iris", Latin lilium
- mármol, "marble", Latin marmor
- miércoles, "Wednesday", Latin Mercuri [dies], "Mercury's [day]"
- milagro, "miracle", Latin miraculum
- nivel, "level", Latin libellum, "little balance", from libra, "balance"
- olor, "smell, scent", Latin odor
- papel, "paper", Catalan paper, Latin papyrus
- palabra, "word", Latin parabola
- peligro, "danger", Latin periculum (cf. English "peril")
- pesebre, "nativity scene", Latin praesēpe
- plática, "chat, conversation", Latin practica
- quemar, "to burn", Latin cremare (cf. English "cremation")
- quilate, "carat", Arabic: قيراط qīrāṭ "carat" < Ancient Greek: κεράτιον "carob seed" (cf. Italian carato)
- recluta, "recruit", French recrute
- regaliz(a), "liquorice", Late Latin liquiritia
- roble, "oak", Latin robur, "strong"
- sable, "sabre", France sabre
- silo, "silo", Latin sirus from Greek siros, "pit for storing grain"
- surco, "groove, furrow", Latin sulcus
- taladro, "drill", Latin tarātrum < Celtic tarātron
- temblar, "tremble", Latin tremulāre
- templar, "temper, warm up", Latin temperō
- tiniebla(s), "darkness", Latin tenebrae

=== Yeísmo ===
Documents from as early as the 15th century show occasional evidence of sporadic confusion between the phoneme /ʝ/ (generally spelled ⟨y⟩) and the palatal lateral /ʎ/ (spelled ⟨ll⟩). The distinction is maintained in spelling, but in most dialects of Modern Spanish, the two have merged into the same, non-lateral palatal sound. Thus, for example, most Spanish-speakers have the same pronunciation for haya (from the verb haber) as for halla (from hallar). The phonemic merger is called yeísmo, based on one name for the letter ⟨y⟩.

Yeismo is a trait of the Andalusian dialect, among others. Since more than half of the early settlers of Spanish America came from Andalusia, most Spanish-speaking regions of the Americas have yeísmo, but there are pockets in which the sounds are still distinguished. Native-speakers of neighboring languages, such as Galician, Astur-Leonese, Basque, Aragonese, Occitan and Catalan, usually do not feature yeísmo in their Spanish since those languages retain the /ʎ/ phoneme.

A related trait that has also been documented sporadically for several hundred years is rehilamiento (literally "whizzing"), the pronunciation of /ʝ/ as a sibilant fricative [ʒ] or even an affricate [dʒ], which is common among non-native Spanish speakers as well. The current pronunciation varies greatly depending on the geographical dialect and sociolect (with [dʒ], especially, stigmatized except at the beginning of a word). Rioplatense Spanish (of Argentina and Uruguay) is particularly known for the pronunciation [ʒ] of both /ʝ/ and original /ʎ/. A further development, the unvoiced pronunciation [ʃ], during the second half of the twentieth century came to characterize the speech of "most younger residents of Buenos Aires" and continues to spread throughout Argentina.

=== Modern changes ===
Many modern dialects debuccalize the /s/ to [h], some further undergo deletion and compensatory lengthening of nearby vowel or consonant.

== See also ==
- Cantar de mio Cid
- Hispano-Celtic languages
- Iberian language
- Iberian Romance languages
- Influences on the Spanish language
- List of Spanish words of Indigenous American Indian origin
- List of Spanish words of Philippine origin
- List of English words of Spanish origin
- Romance languages
- Spanish dialects and varieties
- Spanish phonology
- Old Spanish language
- Paleohispanic languages
- Middle Spanish
- Vulgar Latin
- Rafael Lapesa

== Sources ==
- Boyd-Bowman, Peter (1964), Índice geobiográfico de cuarenta mil pobladores españoles de América en el siglo XVI (Vol. I), Bogotá: Instituto Caro y Cuervo
- Corominas, Joan (1973), Breve diccionario etimológico de la lengua castellana, Madrid: Gredos
- Cravens, Thomas D. (2002), Comparative Historical Dialectology: Italo-Romance clues to Hispano-Romance sound change, Amsterdam: John Benjamins
- Erichsen, Gerald (January 27, 2018), "Languages of Spain Not Limited to Spanish: Spanish is one of four official languages", ThoughtCo
- Hammond, Robert M. (2001), The Sounds of Spanish: Analysis and Application (with Special Reference to American English), Somerville, Massachusetts: Cascadilla Press, ISBN 1-57473-018-5
- Lapesa, Rafael (1981) [1942], Historia de la lengua española (9th ed.), Madrid: Gredos, ISBN 84-249-0072-3
- Lathrop, Thomas A. (2003), The Evolution of Spanish, Newark, Delaware: Juan de la Cuesta, ISBN 1-58977-014-5
- Lipski, John M. (1994), Latin American Spanish, London: Longman
- Lloyd, Paul M. (1987), From Latin to Spanish, Philadelphia: American Philosophical Society (Memoirs, Vol. 173), ISBN 0-87169-173-6
- Navarro Tomás, Tomás (1982) [1918], Manual de pronunciación española (21st ed.), Madrid: Concejo Superior de Investigaciones Científicas, ISBN 84-00-03462-7
- Ostler, Nicholas (2005), Empires of the Word: A Language History of the World, New York: HarperCollins, ISBN 0-06-621086-0
- Penny, Ralph (2000). Variation and Change in Spanish. Cambridge University Press. ISBN 0-521-78045-4.
- Penny, Ralph (2002), A History of the Spanish Language, Cambridge: Cambridge University Press, ISBN 978-0-521-01184-6
- Spaulding, Robert Kilburn (1971) [1943], How Spanish Grew, Berkeley: University of California Press, ISBN 0-520-01193-7
- Walsh, Thomas J. (1991), "The Demise of Lenition as a Productive Phonological Process in Hispano-Romance", in Harris-Northall, Ray; Cravens, Thomas D. (eds.), Linguistic Studies in Medieval Spanish, Madison: Hispanic Seminary of Medieval Studies, pp. 149–163
