= RFE Phonetic Alphabet =

Phonetic transcription system for Iberian languages

The RFE Phonetic Alphabet, named for a journal of philology, the Revista de Filología Española, 'Review of Spanish Philology' (RFE), is a phonetic alphabet originally developed in 1915 for the languages and dialects of Iberian origin, primarily Spanish. The alphabet was proposed by Tomás Navarro Tomás and adopted by the Centro de Estudios Históricos, 'Center of Historical Studies' in Madrid for the RFE and by the Instituto de Filología de Buenos Aires, 'Institute of Philology of Buenos Aires'. It is used solely in works based on Hispanic themes, such as the Atlas Lingüístico de la Península Ibérica, 'Linguistic Atlas of the Iberian Peninsula' (ALPI), as well as phonetics manuals. Additionally, this phonetic alphabet is taught at the universities of Spanish-speaking countries such as Mexico.

== Symbols ==
Bilabial consonants
RFE	Example	Transcription	Consonant	IPA
b	bondad	bon̹dáđ̥	Voiced bilabial stop	b
p	padre	páđre	Voiceless bilabial stop	p
m	amar	amár	Voiced bilabial nasal	m
m̥	mismo (And.)	mím̥mo	Voiceless bilabial nasal	m̥
ƀ	haba	áƀa	Voiced bilabial fricative	β
ƀ̥	las botas (And.)	la ƀ̥ótah	Voiceless bilabial fricative	ɸ

Labiodental consonants
RFE	Example	Transcription	Consonant	IPA
m̭	confuso	kom̭fúṡo	Labiodental nasal	ɱ
f	fácil	fáθįl	Voiceless labiodental fricative	f
v	vida (emphatic)	víđa	Voiced labiodental fricative	v

Interdental consonants
RFE	Example	Transcription	Consonant	IPA
ḍ	cruz divina (emphatic)	krúẓ ḍiƀína	Voiced interdental stop	d̪͆
ṭ	hazte acá	áθṭe aká	Voiceless interdental stop	t̪͆
ṇ	onza	óṇθa	Interdental nasal	n̪͆
ẓ	juzgar	xųẓǥár		
θ	mozo	móθo	Voiceless interdental fricative	θ̪͆
đ	rueda	r̄wéđa	Voiced interdental fricative	ð̪͆
_{đ}	tomado	tomá_{đ}o	Interdental approximant	ð̞
_{đ̥}	verdad	bęrđá_{đ̥}	Voiceless interdental approximant	θ̞
ḷ	calzado	kaḷθa_{đ}o	Voiceless interdental lateral	l̪͆

Dental consonants
RFE	Example	Transcription	Consonant	IPA
d	ducho	dúĉo	Voiced dental stop	d̪
t	tomar	tomáɹ	Voiceless dental stop	t̪
n̹	monte	món̹te	Dental nasal	n̪
z̹	desde	déz̹đe	Voiced dental fricative	ð
s̹	hasta	ás̹ta	Voiceless dental fricative	θ
l̹	falda	fál̹da	Dental lateral approximant	l̪

Alveolar consonants
RFE	Example	Transcription	Consonant	IPA
n	mano	mã́no	Alveolar nasal	n
n̥	asno (And.)	án̥no	Voiceless alveolar nasal	n̥
ŝ	chobu (W.Ast.)	ŝóƀu	Voiceless alveolar affricate	ʦ
z	los días (Mex.)	lo zíah		
s	rosa (And.)	r̄osa		
ż	rasgar	r̄ażǥáɹ	Voiced alveolar fricative	z
ṡ	casa	káṡa	Voiceless alveolar fricative	s
l	luna	lúna	Alveolar lateral approximant	l
l̥	muslo (And.)	mųl̥lo	Voiceless alveolar lateral approximant	l̥
r	hora	ǫ́ra	Alveolar flap	ɾ
r̥	multitud	mųr̥titú	Voiceless alveolar flap	ɾ̥
r̄	carro	kár̄o	Alveolar trill	r
ɹ	color	kolǫ́ɹ	Alveolar approximant	ɹ
ɹ̊	trigo (Mex.)	tɹ̊íǥo	Voiceless alveolar approximant	ɹ̥
ɹ̱	honra (Chil.), pondré (Mex.)	ónɹ̱a, põɹ̱é	Geminated voiced alveolar approximant	[ɹː]
ɹ̱̊	perro (Chil.)	pę́ɹ̱̊o / pę́ɹ̱o	Geminated voiceless alveolar approximant	[ɹ̥ː]
𝽗			Lax alveolar trill (Superscript form is 𝿍)	

Prepalatal consonant
RFE	Example	Transcription	Consonant	IPA
n̮	año	án̮o	Palatal nasal	ɲ
ŷ	yugo	ŷúǥo	Voiced palatal affricate	ɟ͡ʝ
ĉ	mucho	múĉo	Voiceless postalveolar affricate	ʧ
ž	mayo (Arg.)	mažo	Voiced postalveolar fricative	ʒ
š	rexa (Ast.)	r̄eša	Voiceless postalveolar fricative	ʃ
y	mayo	máyo	Voiced palatal fricative	ʝ
ẙ	jefe (Chil.)	ẙefe / ẙjéfe		
j	nieto	njéto	Palatal approximant	j
j̊	inquieto	iŋ́ḱj̊éto / iŋ́ḱj̊eto		
l̮	castillo	kas̹tíl̮o	Palatal lateral approximant	ʎ
ÿ	subyugar	sųƀÿuǥáɹ		

Pospalatal consonants
RFE	Example	Transcription
ǵ	guitarra	ǵitár̄a
ḱ	quimera	ḱiméra
ŋ́	inquirir	iŋ́ḱirír
ǥ́	seguir	ṡeǥ́iɹ
x́	regir	r̄ex́ír

Velar consonants
RFE	Example	Transcription	Consonant	IPA
g	gustar	gųs̹táɹ	Voiced velar stop	g
k	casa	káṡa	Voiceless velar stop	k
ŋ	nunca	nṹŋka	Velar nasal	ŋ
ǥ	rogar	r̄oǥár	Voiced velar fricative	ɣ
x	jamás	xamás	Voiceless velar fricative	x
ł	malalt (Cat.)	məlạł	Velarized alveolar lateral approximant	ɫ
w	hueso	wéṡo	Voiced labio-velar approximant	w
w̥	fuera (esp. enf.)	fw̥éra	Voiceless labio-velar approximant	ʍ

Uvular consonants
RFE	Example	Transcription
ŋ̇	don Juan	doŋ̇ ẋwán
ǥ̇	aguja	aǥ̇úxa
ẋ	enjuagar	eŋ̇ẋwaǥár

Laryngeal consonants
RFE	Example	Transcription	Consonant	IPA
h	horno (And.)	hǫ́rno	Voiceless glottal fricative	h

Vowels
RFE	Description
į ę ǫ ų	Lowered
i e a o u	Unmarked vowels
ᴉ ǝ ɐ 𝽘 𝽙	Relaxed (Superscript forms are ᵎ ᵊ ᵄ 𝿎 𝿏)
ẹ ọ	Raised
ą	Fronted a
ạ	Backed a
ǫ̈	Labialized ę
ö	Labialized e
ų̈	Labialized į
ü	Labialized i
ə	Schwa
ĩ ã ũ õ, etc.	Nasalized vowels
á ó ę́ ã́	Vowels with stress marker
aː oː lː sː mː nː, etc.	Long (Vowel Length or Gemination)
_{đ} _{đ̥}, etc.	Reduced sounds

== Sources ==
- RFE (1915) "Alfabeto fonético de la revista de filología española"; Revista de Filología Española 2: 374-376.
- Navarro Tomás, Tomás (1966) "El alfabeto fonético de la Revista de Filología Española"; Anuario de Letras 6: 5-19.

== See also ==
- Phonetics
- Phonology
- Phonetic transcription
- International Phonetic Alphabet
- Phonetic alphabet (disambiguation)
