= Pilar García Mouton =

Spanish linguist (born 1953)

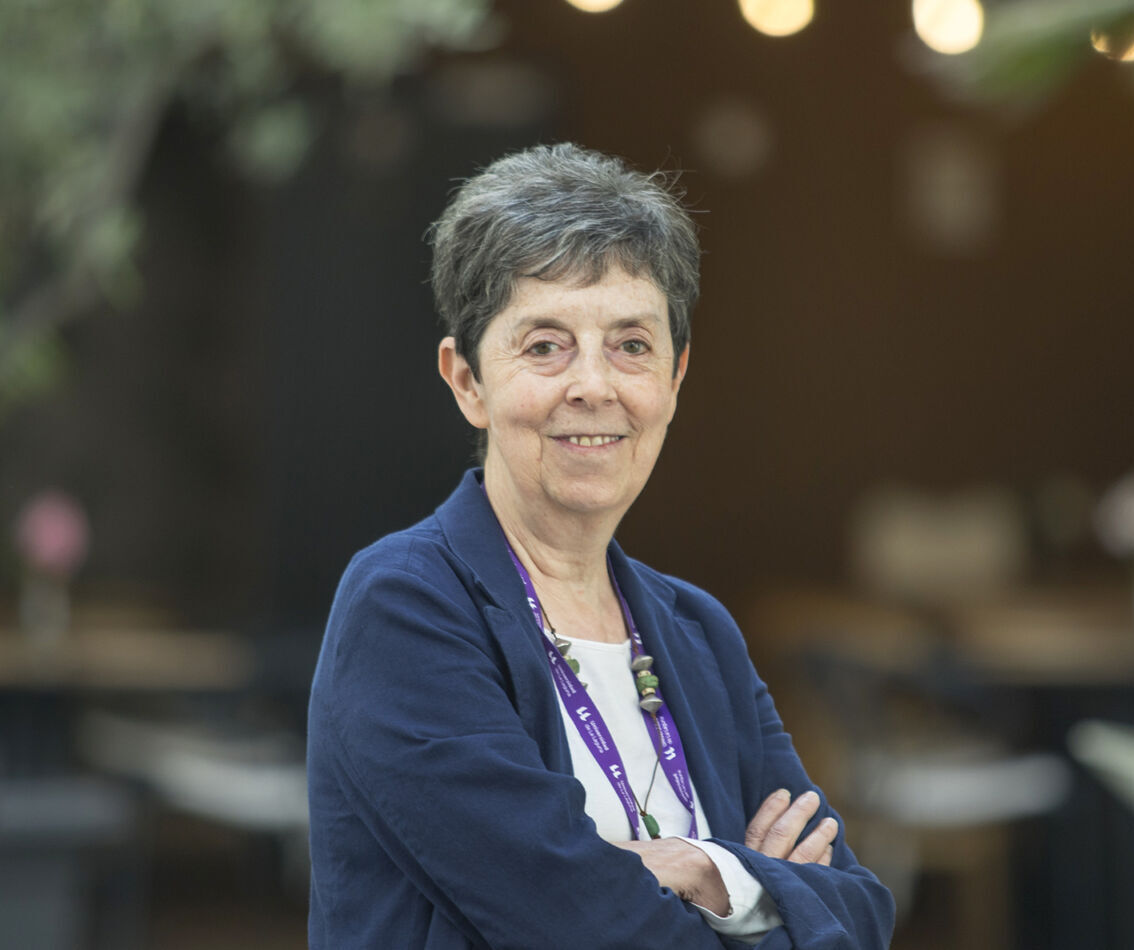
- Born: March 5, 1953 (age 73)

Academic work
- Discipline: philology
- Institutions: Spanish National Research Council

Pilar García Mouton (born March 5, 1953) is a Spanish philologist, research professor at the Spanish National Research Council (CSIS), specialist in dialectology and linguistic geography and, a corresponding academic of the Royal Spanish Academy (RAE).

== Early life ==
Mouton was born in 1953, the daughter of the philologist Valentín García Yebra. She obtained a doctorate in romance studies at the Complutense University of Madrid, of which she was also professor for a time. She was a student of Manuel Alvar, with whom she worked on the Atlas Lingüístico de Castilla y León and also did surveys in various countries for the Atlas Lingüístico de Hispanoamérica.

== Career ==
She has been an author and coordinator of various geographic linguistics projects: for example, the Atlas lingüístico (y etnográfico) de Castilla – La Mancha (ALECMan), with Francisco Moreno or the coordination of the publication of the Linguistic Atlas of the Iberian Peninsula.

She also co-directs, alongside Isabel Molina Martos, the Atlas dialectal de Madrid, a small-domain linguistic atlas aimed at studying rural sociolects. She collaborates on the teams of the international projects Atlas Linguistique Roman (ALiR) and Atlas Linguarum Europae (ALE).

Another of her lines of investigation has been women's speech, with the publication of various articles and books.

She was director of the Revista de Filología Española (RFE) between 2005 and 2015, and previously had been secretary since 1987. She was also responsible for the collection Biblioteca Románica Hispánica by the publisher Gredos, from 1989 to 2005 and is a member of the editorial board of numerous journals. She has also exercised various managerial roles in the Spanish National Research Council (Spanish: Consejo Superior de Investigaciones Científicas) and is a member of various evaluation agencies like the ANEP (Agencia Nacional de Evaluación y Prospectiva).

== Public Outreach ==
García Mouton works on science outreach activities, like Palabras moribundas, a segment of the Radio Nacional de España program No es un día cualquiera which she has hosted since 2007.

In 2015, she co-directed an exposition in honor of the 100th anniversary of the Revista de Filología Española (RFE). She has said that differences between men's and women's speech are largely social and cultural rather than innate and that an excess of feminine courtesy can devalue women's image. She also questioned the idea that women make more conciliative, communicative managers.

== Publications ==
- García Mouton, Pilar (2023) [1994]. Lenguas y dialectos de España [Languages and dialects of Spain] (in Spanish) (11th ed.). Madrid: Arco/Libros. ISBN 978-84-7635-164-2.
- —— (1994). Geolingüística: trabajos europeos [Geolinguistics: European efforts] (in Spanish). Madrid: Consejo Superior de Investigaciones Científicas (CSIC). ISBN 978-84-00-07401-2.
- —— (2021) [1999]. Cómo hablan las mujeres [How women speak] (in Spanish) (3rd ed.). Madrid: Arco/Libros. ISBN 978-84-7635-399-8.
- —— (2003). Así hablan las mujeres. Curiosidades y tópicos del uso femenino del lenguaje [This is how women speak. Curiosities and topics on feminine use of language]. Madrid: La Esfera de los libros. hdl:10261/266067. ISBN 84-9734-121-X.
- —— (2003). El español de América 1992 [The Spanish of America 1992]. Madrid: CSIC. hdl:10261/266060. ISBN 84-00-08177-3.
- ——; Grijelmo, Álex (2011). Palabras moribundas [Dying Words]. Madrid: Taurus. ISBN 978-84-306-0834-8.
- La ciencia de la palabra: cien años de la Revista de filología española Madrid: Consejo Superior de Investigaciones Científicas, 2015 (catálogo de la exposición con motivo de la celebración del certamen de la RFE).
