= Name of the Spanish language =

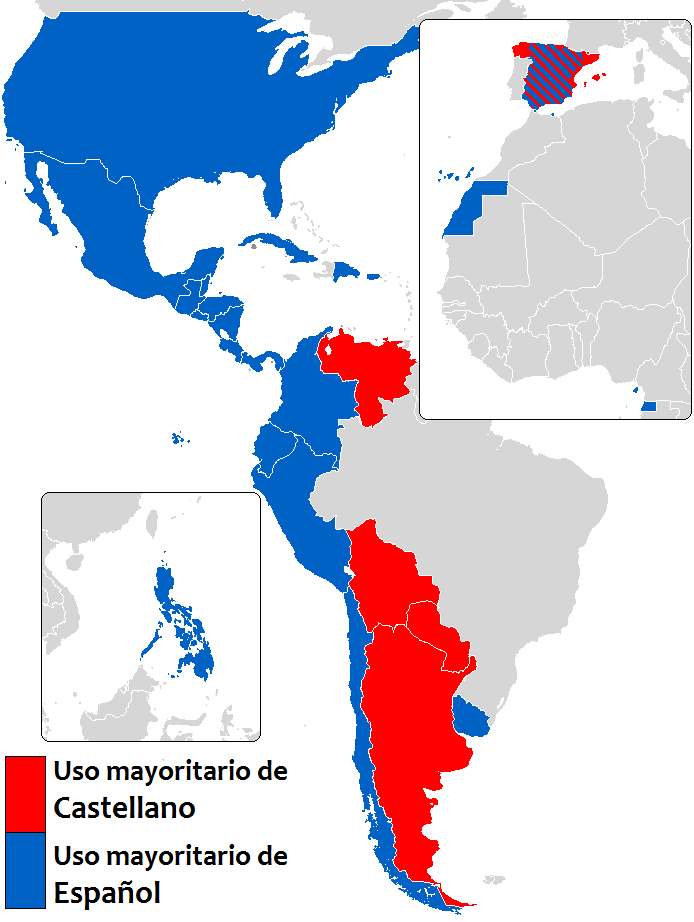
Geographic distribution of the preferential use of the terms castellano (in red) and español (in blue).

The Spanish language has two names: español (English: Spanish) and castellano (English: Castilian). Spanish speakers from different countries or backgrounds can show a preference for one term or the other, or use them indiscriminately, but political issues or common usage might lead speakers to prefer one term over the other. This article identifies the differences between those terms, the countries or backgrounds that show a preference for one or the other, and the implications the choice of words might have for a native Spanish speaker.

Today, the national language of Spain – the official Spanish language – is Spanish (as opposed to the regional languages of Spain, such as Galician, Catalan, Asturleonese, and Basque). Generally speaking, both terms (español and castellano) can be used to refer to the Spanish language as a whole, with a preference for one over the other that depends on the context or the speaker's origin. Castellano (as well as Castilian in English) has another, more restricted, meaning, relating either to the old Romance language spoken in the Kingdom of Castile in the Middle Ages, predecessor of the modern Spanish language, or to some formal varieties of Spanish which are popularly imagined as related to the historical region of Castile, in central Spain.

== History of the terms ==
Originally Castilian (castellano) referred to the language of the Kingdom of Castile, one of several northern kingdoms that spread across the Iberian Peninsula through the Middle Ages, from about the 8th to the 15th centuries. Traditionally the first recorded examples of written Castilian/Spanish are considered to be the Glosas Emilianenses, a number of isolated words added to a Latin text as an aid to the reader, dated to the eleventh century. Soon after that there begin to appear discursive texts in Castilian, such as the Cantar de Mio Cid. This early Romance language was derived from Latin and evolved into modern Spanish.

However, the term Spanish (español) is a more recent term that first referred to Spain as a country, and then to the predominant language spoken in that country. Spain as a truly unified nation appeared centuries later than the language and the Kingdom of Castile; in fact, it was only in the late 15th century that the personal union between the Crowns of Castile and Aragon unified Spain. The actual legal unification date is disputed, but commonly agreed to have occurred not earlier than the eighteenth century at the end of the War of the Spanish Succession. Only then did the Castilian language begin to be commonly called Spanish.

In 1492, the arrival of Christopher Columbus on a Castilian-paid expedition paved the way for the Spanish colonization of the Americas. As a result of this process, most countries in South America now speak the same language as Castile. Until about the eighteenth century, the Kingdom of Castile, and not Spain as a whole, was the colonizing power, and the language used was called castellano. Thus, some Hispanic American countries formerly under Spanish rule have retained the custom of calling it castellano, while others eventually switched to calling it español, with many different factors influencing the final choice.

In English, the term Spanish relates both to the language and to the nation. The noun used for a person from Spain is Spaniard, with the collective noun the Spanish. The term Castilian is much less widespread among English speakers than the term Spanish.

=== Español ===
Two main hypotheses have been proposed for the origin of the word español: one based on dissimilation in Old Spanish españón (from a presumed Vulgar Latin *hispaniōne), and the other on an Occitan term derived from a presumed Vulgar Latin *hispaniolus. Both Latin ancestor words are based on the place name Hispania (which evolved into España by regular sound changes); and both are marked with an asterisk to indicate that they are reconstructed, not directly attested.

The dissimilation hypothesis, advanced by Ramón Menéndez Pidal, presumes that Latin Hispania was lengthened by the derivational suffix -ōne (which survives in other ethnonyms such as bretón, borgoñón, sajón, and lapón). The Old Spanish form españon is documented in works of the 13th and 14th centuries. It is suggested that the final /n/ of this form changed to /l/ by dissimilation from the previous nasal consonant, ñ. This sporadic sound change is observed in some other words: Menéndez Pidal cites Barcelona (from Barcinone) and delante (from de in ante); Lathrop adds ingle (from ing[ui]ne) and sangre (from sang[ui]ne).

According to the Occitan scenario, advanced by Rafael Lapesa, the Spanish borrowed the Occitan name for themselves, which was the name España plus the diminutive suffix -ol, from the Latin -olus. The Occitan influence is inferred because in Castilian the same Latin suffix would have produced *españuelo rather than español. Lapesa counters the dissimilation hypothesis by citing other words with -ñón in which dissimilation did not take place: cañón, borgoñón, riñón, etc. (However, the suffix could have been restored analogically in these, or they were formed after the dissimilation took place.) Penny, in discussing loans from French and Occitan, calls this "the most remarkable loan of all, español 'Spanish', replacing native españón."

The name Hispania was applied to the Iberian Peninsula by the Romans when they discovered and later subjugated it. One theory about this name is that it comes from Canaanite אי שפנים (ʾî šəpānîm), meaning 'island of hyraxes', named by Canaanite-speaking Phoenicians who mistook Spain's large rabbit population for hyraxes. Several other theories about the name have been advanced as well (see Hispania).

The Romans called the inhabitants of Hispania hispani (singular: hispanus), and the relevant adjective was hispanicus. These terms, had they undergone regular sound change into Castilian, would have developed into España, *espanos (singular: *espano) and *espánego or *espango—but in reality, only the first term exists in modern Castilian.

As the branches of Vulgar Latin began to evolve into separate Romance languages, the term that would evolve into español began to be used to refer to these derivative languages (especially as opposed to the Arabic and Hebrew of the Moorish and Jewish inhabitants of Iberia). It was at first a general term that embraced the various dialects of Iberian Romance spoken in the area, including the forebears of modern Portuguese, Galician, Castilian and Catalan. However, with the rise of Castile as a power, and its absorption of all surrounding regions into an ever-growing empire that eventually spread to the New World, the term España was eventually equated with the peninsular territories ruled by the Crown. With this, the break with the Roman concept of Hispania was complete, and the term acquired its modern meaning of 'all of Iberia except for Portugal and Andorra'. Similarly, español came to be used to refer to the common language of this new country: Castilian.

The terms España and español spread to other languages. The English name Spain is from the French Espagne. Spanish is Spain plus the English suffix -ish. The term continues evolving as other languages adapt these words to form their own name for Spain—for example, Japanese スペイン語 (Supein-go), 'Spanish language', and スペイン人 (Supein-jin), 'Spaniard', derive from the Japanese word for Spain, スペイン (Supein), which, in turn, derives from English Spain. In Chinese, the word is taken directly from Spanish (or perhaps even Latin) rather than English: 西班牙 (Pinyin phonetic symbols: xībānyá) for Spain and 西班牙语 (Pinyin: xībānyá yǔ), or the abbreviation 西語 (Pinyin: xī yǔ) for the Spanish language. The Arabic إسبانية (isbāniya) for Spain derives directly from the word Hispania (noting that the absence of "p" in the Arabic alphabet makes it a "b").

=== Castellano ===
Castilla ("Castile" in English) is commonly thought to mean 'Castle-land'. The word is derived from Latin castella, the plural of castellum, which, in turn, is a diminutive form of castrum' 'fortress, castle'. Through most of the Middle Ages the word was spelled Castiella, a form that survives in Leonese today. (Modern Spanish has transformed all words ending in -iello, -iella into illo, -illa.) The adjective derived from Castilla is castellano. 'Castellano also means 'castellan', i.e. a castle master. There is a comic scene based on the play on words Castilian/castellan in the novel Don Quixote (Chapter 2).

The region was thus named because it was a frontier land controlled from a series of fortified castles. It shared borders with rival Moorish Iberia (to the south) and the Christian kingdoms of Leon (to the west) and Navarre and Aragon (to the east).

In Guatemala, although Spanish is the official language, the Maya peoples, descendants of the original inhabitants of the region, call it la castilla, keeping the original name from colonial times. Mayans speak at least 22 different Mayan languages and dialects, including Mam, Pocomam, Kaqchikel, Tz’utujil, Q’eqchi’, and Kʼicheʼ.

=== Other local names ===
==== "Cristiano" ====
During the presence of Moors in Hispania, Spanish was sometimes given the name cristiano ("Christian") to distinguish it from the Arabic and Hebrew languages - although the language spoken by Christians under Islamic rule was Mozarabic (of which Aragonese is actually the closest living language). The expression Hablar en cristiano (lit. 'to talk in Christian') means to talk in a plain, understandable way. Sometimes it was addressed aggressively at people speaking other languages of Spain, such as Catalan or Basque, to the chagrin of the speakers of these languages. The phrase is not used outside Spain.

==== "Language of Cervantes" ====
The term lengua de Cervantes as an epithet for the Spanish language began to be used early in the 19th century. Mariano José de Larra uses the expression in his essay Literatura, first published in 1823. In 1829 it appears in Una cuestión de derecho, by Manuel Sivela. Soon after that it appears in an anonymous article in the Gaceta de Madrid. The poet Nicasio Camilo Jover, in his poem Miguel de Cervantes, states directly Y la lengua del pueblo castellano / Hoy se llama la lengua de Cervantes. Spanish is called el idioma de Cervantes in a book published in 1830, and in another one published in 1838.

Occasionally the term refers to the language of Spanish Golden Age literature generally, rather than simply to that of Cervantes.

"The language of Cervantes" in English—as a term for the Spanish language generally—comes into use in the 1840s. Examples appear in Janin (1841) and Campbell (1849).

While quotations and expressions from Cervantes' work are still in use, the actual language and spelling that Cervantes used can sound archaic to modern readers. Modern editions may modernize it to appeal the current public.

==== "Román paladino" ====
The poet Gonzalo de Berceo, writing in the 13th century, used the phrase román paladino to mean simple, straightforward language, the language spoken by the common people, as opposed to Latin. In the famous passage from his Vida de Santo Domingo de Silos, Berceo says Quiero fer una prosa en roman paladino, / en cual suele el pueblo fablar con so vezino; / ca non so tan letrado por fer otro latino. / Bien valdra, como creo, un vaso de bon vino ("I want to write verse [sic] in clear vernacular, in which the townsfolk speak to their neighbor; for I'm not so learned as to make another in Latin. It will be worth, I think, a glass of good wine"). Roman—and, more frequently romanz (and later romance)—was used in medieval Spanish as a synonym of castellano, i.e. the language now commonly called Old Spanish. And paladino meant—in Berceo's time the same as it does today—"public, clear, obvious". (Old Spanish paladino existed alongside its learned cognate palatino, which usually referred to the Palatine Hill of Rome. Both words are derived ultimately from Latin palatīnum "of the palace", with influence from Latin palam "openly".) Today román paladino is a high-sounding epithet for clear, straightforward Spanish. Recently it has been popularized in public speeches by Spain's Prime Minister Mariano Rajoy, who has used it frequently as an equivalent for "I will clearly state..."

== Royal Spanish Academy ==
In Spain, the Royal Spanish Academy is a normative body that rules on the orthography and general usage rules of the language. The Academy has used castellano since the 18th century, but since 1923, its dictionary and grammar are de la lengua española ("of the Spanish language"). The Academy's usage of one term is not necessarily a condemnation of the other.

There are many other academies (grouped under the Association of Spanish Language Academies) that may or may not have an official normative recognition but nevertheless cooperate in the creation of the Diccionario panhispánico de dudas (a compendium of corrected typical mistakes and doubts). The dictionary, whose production was agreed upon by the 22 different Spanish Language Academies, says:

Para designar la lengua común de España y de muchas naciones de América, y que también se habla como propia en otras partes del mundo, son válidos los términos castellano y español. La polémica sobre cuál de estas denominaciones resulta más apropiada está hoy superada. [...] Aun siendo sinónimo de español, resulta preferible reservar el término castellano para referirse al dialecto románico nacido en el Reino de Castilla durante la Edad Media, o al dialecto del español que se habla actualmente en esa región.

When naming the common language of Spain and of many nations of America, which is also spoken as a first language in other parts of the world, the terms Castilian and Spanish are [both] valid. The debate over which of these designations is more appropriate is presently settled. [...] Although it is a synonym of Spanish, it is preferable to reserve the term Castilian to refer to the Romance language arising in the Kingdom of Castile during the Middle Ages, or to the dialect of Spanish currently spoken in that region.

— Diccionario Panhispánico de Dudas, 2005

Thus, even if both terms are allowed in Spanish, the use of español is recommended for the language as a whole. However, popular choice of terms is not so clear, with other factors, such as customs or geographical location, being factors.

== Usage in Spain ==
Spaniards tend to call the language español (Spanish) to contrast it to languages of other states, such as in a list with French (francés), German (alemán), etc. Castellano (Castilian) is, by contrast, more often used when contrasting the language with other regional languages of Spain, such as Basque, Catalan, Galician or Asturleonese. The Spanish Constitution of 1978 uses the term el castellano to define the official language of the whole State, opposed to las demás lenguas españolas (the other Spanish languages). Article 3 reads in part:

El castellano es la lengua española oficial del Estado. Todos los españoles tienen el deber de conocerla y el derecho a usarla. Las demás lenguas españolas serán también oficiales en las respectivas Comunidades Autónomas...

Castilian is the official Spanish language of the State. All Spaniards have the duty to know it and the right to use it. The other Spanish languages as well shall be official in their respective Autonomous Communities...

— Spanish Constitution of 1978

This choice of words, however, varies depending on many factors, including the origin of the speaker or some political nuances.

=== Bilingual and multilingual regions of Spain ===
In the regions where regional languages are spoken, there is a daily need to make the contrast between the national language and the regional language and so the national language is most often referred to as Castilian, particularly in the regional languages themselves—for example, espanyol is virtually never used to refer to the language in Catalan, castellà is used instead; in Basque, the name of the language is gaztelania or gaztelera, rather than espainiera; and in Galician, the most commonly used term is castelán rather than español. This practice is often mirrored by educated English speakers to refer to the linguistic situation in Spain.

For some, this use of the term castellano is a political or cultural statement that Spanish is only the language of Castile, perhaps also of some areas that Castile colonised, but not the language of their region, which they consider the only legitimate language to be the one proper to that territory. That stance is common in regionalist circles.

Conversely, some nationalist circles prefer the term español because they perceive their ethnic community to be distinct from that of Spain and therefore do not object to the language of Spain being called Spanish. In Basque-speaking regions, whose language is not of Romance origin (Basque is considered by many scholars to be a language isolate), some Basque speakers also use the term erdara or erdera (lit. 'foreign') to refer specifically to Spanish, since for them, it is the prevalent foreign language, just as in the French Basque Country, "French language" is the usual meaning of erdara; in fact, erdara is another language, different from Basque.

=== Monolingual regions of Spain ===
In monolingual regions, the implications are a little different. In such regions, there is no identity implication, but still, they must choose one of the two terms. Castilians usually use the term el español, legitimately presenting it as the national language. However, they also frequently call it el castellano, either to assert their ownership or to distinguish it from the regional languages.

Monolingual regions outside of Castile include mainly Andalusia but also other regions where the regional languages are not developed enough to be widely spoken by the majority of the population, such as Extremadura, Cantabria or Aragon. There, español may be used, as in Castile, to stress the national nature of the language but with a slightly different nuance: they are accepting another region's historical language as their own.

=== Concept of a standard ===
The term castellano is occasionally used to imply more of a standard form than español does. For example, if someone mispronounces a word, they might be told ¡Habla castellano!, i.e. 'Speak Castilian!', 'Speak properly!'. However, that nuance is not to be exaggerated, as it is perfectly possible that the term español or even, jocularly, cristiano ('Christian') could be used instead. Moreover, the term castellano is also commonly and correctly used to refer to dialects of Spanish, which deviate dramatically from the standard.

== Usage and implications in former colonies ==
Both names are commonly used in parts of the world colonized by Spanish speakers, such as Hispanic America, Philippines, Equatorial Guinea, and the Canary Islands. As in Spain, the implications are complex. The most common term used in Hispanic America is español, generally considered to be a neutral term simply reflecting the country that the language came from. For people who use that term, castellano may possibly imply greater correctness, as it sometimes does in Spain, or it may merely be an alien term, referring to a region in a far-off country. The residents of Canary Islands usually call their language español, while Canary Islands is politically part of Spain. This is because Canary Islands are miles away from mainland Spain; in all areas of Spain, Canary Islands is the only area in Spain wherein the language is only called español and not castellano.

However, some Hispanic Americans prefer the term castellano, especially in Argentina, Chile, Peru, and Venezuela. One reason for this is that many early Argentine settlers were Galician, for whom castellano had long been associated with the Spanish state in addition to Castile. Along with Basques or Catalans, Galicians might perceive the term español as imperialistic and misrepresenting the language of Castile as the language of Spain.

In Chile, the term castellano has historically been popular mainly because this was the term introduced by the Spanish themselves during colonial times, and continued to be the more common term used by Chileans until the 1970s. With the widespread introduction of español to refer to the Spanish language via TV shows and cultural exchanges from Mexico, Spanish Caribbean, and Central America, this has become the more dominant name for the language, especially among younger generations and the middle to upper classes. Most Chileans still use the terms español and castellano interchangeably, as the latter gives significant cultural weight in the country.

Peruvians often prefer the term castellano for similar reasons to avoid the linkage between español and España. The Governorate of New Castile (Gobernación de Nueva Castilla) was established in Lima, Peru in 1528, and Peruvian history classes still emphasize the Castilian origin of the first conquerors and settlers. That tendency often manifests itself in a preference for films dubbed into Latin American Spanish, which often take longer to reach the market, over those in Español (Peninsular Spanish characterized by the use of vosotros), which tend to be found in pirated "cam" versions of films. Using español to refer to Peninsular Spanish is exactly the opposite of how English-speakers use the two terms, which can create some confusion.

In Venezuela, the residents often call their language castellano, as their Constitution calls it & it is the language of Castile.

Castellano may also be used to refer to the dialect of Spanish spoken in Castile, and español would generally refer to Standard Spanish. In practice, usage tends to be a matter of local custom rather than reflecting any philosophical or political position. However, the fact that Castile is now a region subsumed within modern Spain has been the decisive factor in the preferential usage of español in an international context.

=== Countries whose constitutions use the term castellano ===
- Bolivia: The amendment of 1994 mentions castellano in passing; schools use castellano, but español is still frequent in common speech.
- Colombia: The Colombian Constitution of 1991 uses the term castellano to define the official language of the country: "El castellano es el idioma oficial de Colombia". However, español is the most used term in common speech.
- Ecuador
- Paraguay
- Peru: The Peruvian Constitution of 1993 uses the term castellano to define the official language of the country. However, español is the most used term in common speech.
- Philippines: The first two constitutions of the Philippines specify castellano, both in Spanish and Filipino (Kastilà), and the official Filipino version of the current 1987 Constitution uses Kastilà (castellano) when referring to the language. However, the term español (Espanyól) is also encountered in common speech and writing, and both terms are interchangeable in Philippine Spanish and other languages of the Philippines.
- Spain: Castilian (castellano) is the official language of the State. All Spaniards have the duty to know it and the right to use it. Other Spanish languages (languages of Spain) shall be official in the respective autonomous communities, according to their Statutes of Autonomy.
- Venezuela

=== Countries whose constitutions use the term español ===
- Costa Rica
- Equatorial Guinea
- Guatemala
- Honduras
- Nicaragua
- Panama

=== Countries whose constitutions do not mention any of the terms ===
- Argentina
- Chile
- Cuba
- Dominican Republic
- Mexico
- Uruguay

== Usage and misconceptions abroad ==
Some philologists use "Castilian" only for the language spoken in Castile during the Middle Ages and state that it is preferable to use "Spanish" for its modern form. The dialect of Spanish spoken in northern parts of modern Castile may also be called "Castilian." It differs from those of other regions of Spain (Andalusia for example); the Castilian dialect is conventionally considered in Spain to be the same as Standard Spanish.

Another use of Castilian in English is to distinguish between the Standard Spanish of the Iberian Peninsula and regional dialects. As noted above, the distinction is made to some extent in Spanish but not as far as some English-speakers go; for example, websites with language selection screens give the choice between Castilian Spanish and Latin American Spanish, among other languages.

In the Americas, where Spanish is the native language of 20 countries, usage of castellano and español is sometimes reversed to refer to another nation. For example, a Peruvian talking about a Uruguayan might say, Yo hablo en español peruano, él habla en español uruguayo, pero los dos hablamos castellano ("I speak Peruvian Spanish, he speaks Uruguayan Spanish, but we both speak Castilian"). That usage comes from the historical association of español with the language that was brought to the Americas by conquistadores and was later transformed in each nation through daily usage, with castellano as the basis for all variants.

== See also ==
- Castilian Spanish
- Iberian languages
- Languages of Spain
- Iberian Romance languages
