= Ángel Rosenblat =

Venezuelan writer

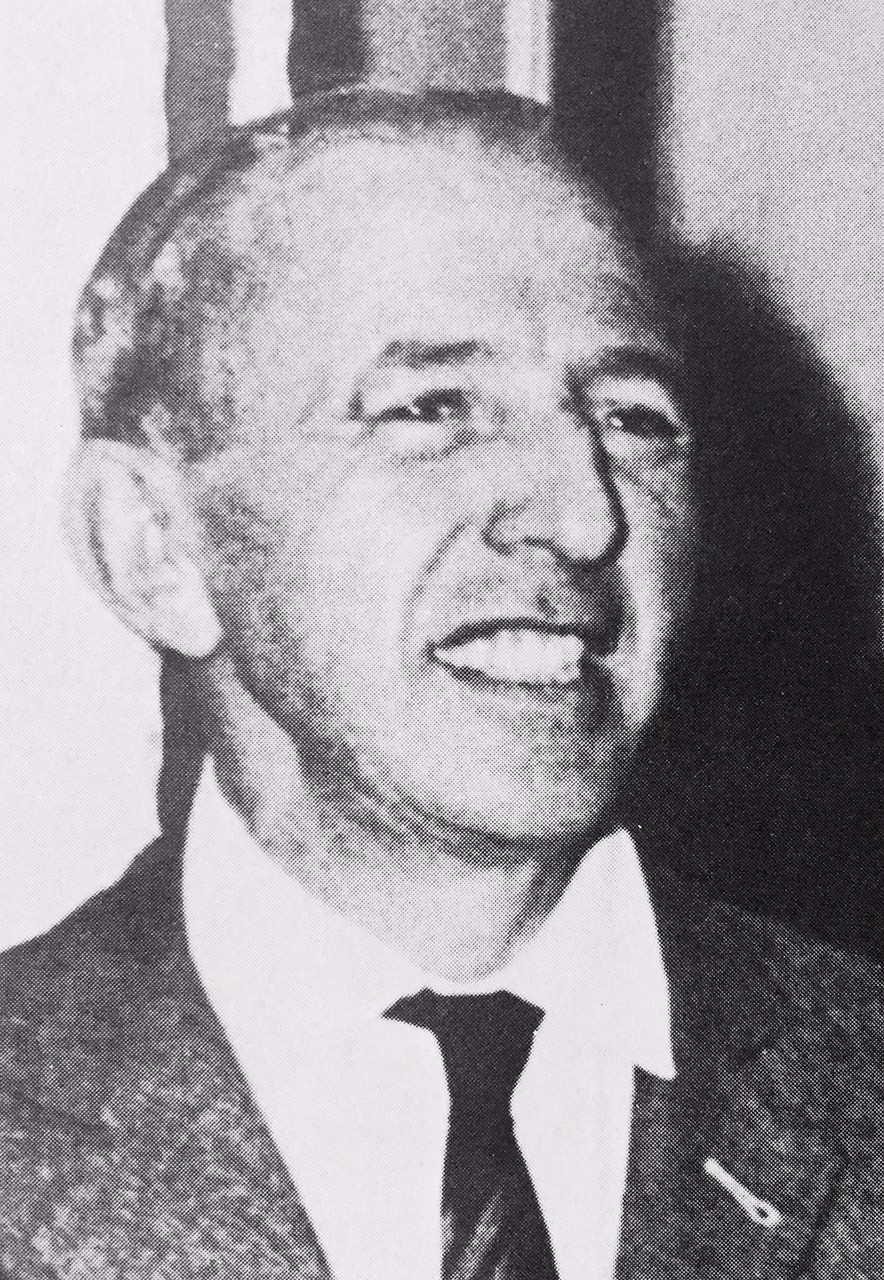
Ángel Rosenblat in 1957

Ángel Rosenblat (9 December 1902, Węgrów, Poland – 11 September 1984, Caracas) was a Poland-born Venezuelan philologist, essayist and hispanist of Jewish descent.

== Life ==
He and his family moved to Argentina when he was six and he spent his whole education there, including at the University of Buenos Aires, where his classmates included Amado Alonso, and in its Institute of Philology, where his teachers included Pedro Henríquez Ureña.

== Works ==
- Lengua y cultura de Hispanoamérica: Tendencias actuales, 1933.
- Población indígena y el mestizaje en América, Buenos Aires, 1954, 2 vols.
- Buenas y malas palabras, 1960.
- Origen e historia del "Che" Argentino, Universidad de Buenos Aires, Buenos Aires, 1962
- El castellano de España y el castellano de América, 1963.
- El nombre de la Argentina, 1964 (Eudeba, Buenos Aires)
- El futuro de nuestra lengua, 1967
- Actual nivelación léxica en el mundo hispánico, 1975.
- La primera visión de América y otros estudios (Caracas: Publicaciones del Ministerio de Educación, 1969)
- Nuestra lengua en ambos mundos (Biblioteca General Salvat. 1971)
- La educación en Venezuela (Caracas: Monte Ávila Ed. 1986, publicada originalmente en 1964)
- La lengua del "Quijote", 1971.
- El criterio de corrección lingüística: Unidad o pluralidad de normas en el castellano de España y América, 1967.
- Los conquistadores y su lengua, 1977.
- Contactos interlinguísticos en el mundo hispánico: el español y las lenguas indígenas (Universidad de Nimega, Países Bajos, 1967)
- La población de América en 1492. Viejos y nuevos cálculos, México, 1967.
- Amadís de Gaula, modernised version, Buenos Aires, 1973.
