= Amado Alonso =

Spanish philologist, linguist and literary critic (1896–1952)

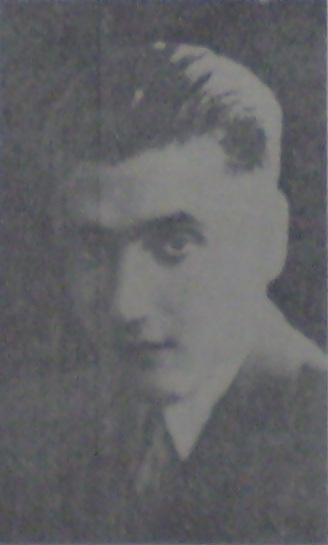
- Amado Alonso
- Born: Amado Alonso García; September 13, 1896; Lerín, Navarre, Spain
- Died: May 26, 1952 (aged 55); Arlington, Massachusetts, United States

Academic work
- Discipline: Philology, Linguistics, Literary criticism
- Institutions: Institute of Philology, Buenos Aires; Harvard University
- Notable works: Castellano, español, idioma nacional (1938); Poesía y estilo de Pablo Neruda (1940); Translation of Cours de linguistique générale (1945); De la pronunciación medieval a la moderna en español (1955)

Amado Alonso García (13 September 1896, Lerín Navarre, Spain – 26 May 1952, Arlington, Massachusetts) was a Spanish philologist, linguist and literary critic, who became a naturalised citizen of Argentina and one of the founders of stylistics.

He was a pupil of Ramón Menéndez Pidal at the Center for Historical Studies in Madrid, where he worked on phonetic and geographical linguistics. Between 1927 and 1946 he lived in Buenos Aires, where he headed the Institute of Philology. He then went to Harvard University and lived in America until his death.

== Work ==
Alonso studied a variety of linguistic topics including phonetics, dialectology and lexis. He showed a keen interest in the study of his native language while contributing directly to the Latin American academic world. Without diverging from Menéndez Pidal's philological orientation, Alonso adopted a clearly linguistic research project. The works of Hispanoamerican authors, especially Bello and Cuervo, had impacted his studies and research. His comparative studies on American Spanish have contributed to a greater linguistic appreciation to the language.

His first published work was in the field of language history, showing derivations of modern Spanish words such as Augustu > agosto and auguriu > agüero (1922). From then until 1927 he wrote eight other articles, most of them published in the Revista de Filología Española. Alonso published some of his most important works between 1928 and 1938 while residing in Buenos Aires. His numerous articles in newspapers and magazines were collected and published in linguistic studio, but his two-volume work, "From medieval to modern Spanish pronunciation" was published post-posthumously by Rafael Lapesa in 1955.

Alonso popularized the structuralist methodology and the main philosophical currents of his time. In 1945 he translated a Course in General Linguistics by Ferdinand de Saussure, who added an important preface, as he had done with the work of Charles Bally and Karl Vossler.

While at Harvard he founded the Nueva Revista de Filología Española published by the Colegio de México, to reignite the spirit of the Revista de Filología Española, created and directed by him in Buenos Aires from 1939 to 1946.

Alonso was an International member of the American Philosophical Society and an International Honorary Member of the American Academy of Arts and Sciences.

== Publications ==
- Estructura de las sonatas de Valle Inclán (1928) – (The structure of the Valle Inclán Sonnets)
- El problema de la lengua en América (1935) – (The language problem in America)
- Castellano, español, idioma nacional. Historia espiritual de tres nombres (1938) – (Castilian, Spanish, National language. The spiritual History of the three names)
- Gramática Castellana (Primer curso, 1938; Segundo curso, 1939) En colaboración con Pedro Henríquez Ureña. – (Spanish Grammar – First course, 1938; Second course, 1939 – In collaboration with Pedro Henríquez Ureña)
- Poesía y estilo de Pablo Neruda (1940) – (The poetry and style of Pablo Neruda)
- Ensayo sobre la novela histórica: El modernismo (1942) – (Essay on the historic novel: Modernism)
- Traducción y prólogo del Curso de Lingüística General de F. de Saussure (1945) – (Translation and preface to the General Linguistics Course of F. de Saussure)
- Estudios lingüísticos. Temas españoles (1951) – (Linguistic studies. Spanish issues)
- Estudios lingüísticos. Temas hispanoamericanos (1953) – (Linguistic studies. Latin-American issues)
- Materia y forma en poesía (1955) – (Matter and form in poetry)
- De la pronunciación medieval a la moderna en español (1955) – (From medieval to modern Spanish pronunciation)
