= José Fernández Montesinos =

Spanish historian & critic (1897–1972)

José Fernández-Montesinos Lustau (Note: His name usually appears in bibliographies as F. Montesinos, José.) (Granada, 5 December 1897 – Berkeley, 8 June 1972) was a Spanish historian and literary critic belonging to the so-called Generación del 27, a generation he himself referred to as "this ill-fated, mistreated and dispersed generation of mine". (Note: "La malhadada, maltrecha y dispersa generación mía".)

== Early career ==
Montesinos graduated in philosophy and literature from Granada University in 1916. From 1917 to 1920, he worked at the Centro de Estudios Históricos, as an assistant to Américo Castro, professor of the history of the Spanish language and whose influence led Montesinos to study the works of Lope de Vega, which he did from 1920 onwards, culminating in the publication of Estudios sobre Lope de Vega, first published in Mexico, in 1951.

Rafael Lapesa (1998), referring to Montesino's war years, remarked, "The Civil War brought on tragedies to his family: while in Madrid he received news from Granada that both his brother, the mayor of the city, and his relative García Lorca had been executed."

== Works ==
Montesino's biographical work can be divided into two separate periods: from 1920 to 1936, clearly related to the interests of Américo and the Centro de Estudios Históricos, that is, Lope, Renaissance humanism of Erasmus, and lexicography. However, in general, he took an interest all Spanish literature from Garcilaso to his cohorts of the Generation of 27.

During the second period, from 1940 to 1946 onwards, while he continued studying the 16- and 17th-century authors, he paid especial attention to the Spanish novels of the 19th century, including those of Benito Pérez Galdós.

== Publications ==
- Estudios sobre Lope, México, El Colegio de México, 1951 (definitive version published by Anaya, Salamanca, 1967)
- Primavera y flor de los mejores romances recogidos por el licdo. Arias Pérez (Madrid, 1621), Valencia, Castalia, 1954
- Introducción a una historia de la novela en España en el siglo XIX, Valencia, Castalia, 1955
- Costumbrismo y novela, Valencia, Castalia, 1960
- Fernán Caballero, México, El Colegio de México, 1961
- Pereda o la novela idilio, Valencia, Castalia, 1969
- Valera o la ficción libre, Valencia, Castalia, 1970
- "Ensayos y estudios de literatura española", IN: Silverman, J. H., Madrid, Revista de Occidente, 1970 (col. Selecta de Revista de Occidente, vol. 36)
- Pérez Galdós, B. Lo prohibido (ed.), Madrid, Castalia, 1971
- Pedro Antonio de Alarcón, Madrid, Castalia, 1977 (2nd ed.)
- Galdós, Madrid, Castalia, 1980 (2nd ed.), 3 vols.
