= Tomás Navarro Tomás =

Spanish-American philologist and librarian (1884–1979)

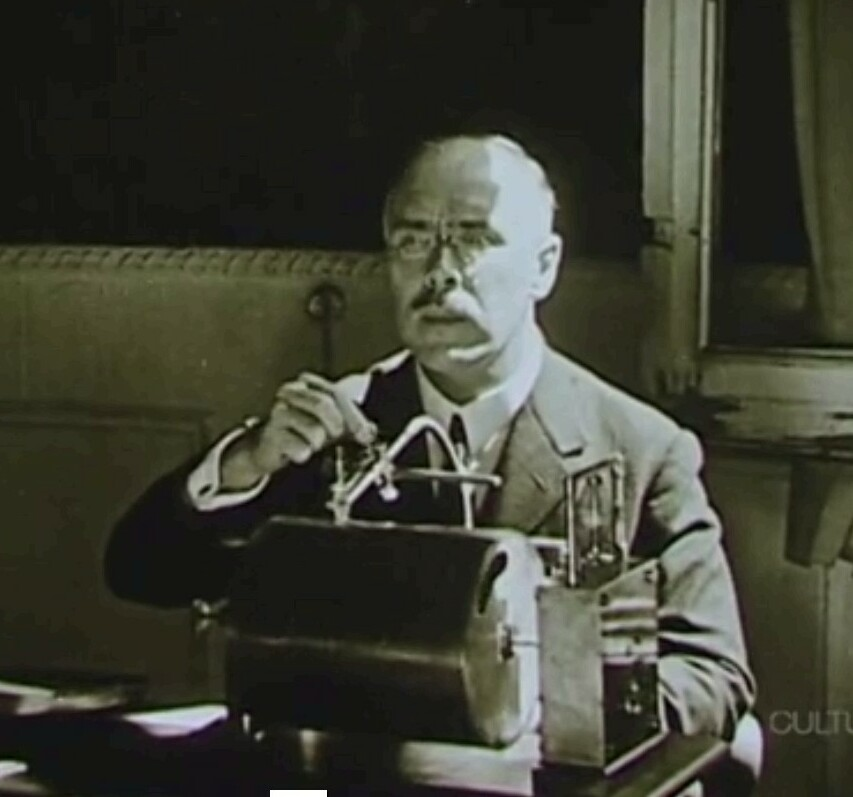
- Tomás Navarro Tomás in 1926
- Born: 12 April 1884; La Roda, (Albacete), Spain
- Died: 16 September 1979 (aged 95); Northampton, Massachusetts, United States
- Occupations: Linguist, writer, librarian

Academic background
- Education: University of Valencia; Universidad Central de Madrid

Academic work
- Discipline: Linguistics
- Sub-discipline: Phonetics and phonology
- Institutions: Centro de Estudios Históricos; Biblioteca Nacional de España; Columbia University

Seat h of the Real Academia Española
- In office 19 May 1935 – 16 September 1979
- Preceded by: Carlos Cortezo
- Succeeded by: Emilio Lorenzo

Tomás Navarro Tomás (12 April 1884 – 16 September 1979) was a Spanish-American philologist, librarian and linguist.

His work in the field of Spanish Philology is one of the key contributions to the Spanish Scientific modernization movement of the twentieth century that took place in the Center of Historical Studies (Centro de Estudios Históricos, CEH by its initials in Spanish). He is considered one of Professor Ramón Menéndez Pidal's dearest students.

He was also an academic with the Royal Spanish Academy (Real Academia de Española RAE by its initials in Spanish) and Director of the National Library before he fled Spain with other Republican intellectuals to the United States in 1939 where he founded the North American Academy of the Spanish Language (Academia Norte Americana de la Lengua Espanola ANLE by its initials in Spanish)

== Life ==
He received his doctorate degree in Madrid (1908) as disciple of Ramón Menéndez Pidal and Miguel Asin Palacios. He then joined the Faculty of Librarians and Curators (Archiveros), and was introduced to the field of Linguistic research as an editor of classic texts such as Las Moradas by Teresa de Jesus (better known in English as "The Interior Castle" or "The Mansions" by the Carmelite nun and mystic Teresa de Avila) and the poetry of Garcilaso de la Vega. These were first published in the collection "La Lectura" and then in "Clasicos Castellanos" (Castilian classics) by the publisher Espasa-Calpe. Between 1912 and 1913 he was the recipient of a scholarship by the Assembly for advanced studies (Junta para Ampliacion de Estudios or JAE by its initials in Spanish), to study phonetics and dialectology in French, German and Swiss Universities. Upon his return, he became a collaborator in the Spanish Philology magazine (Revista de Filología Española) and was appointed as Director of the phonetics laboratory in the CEH associated to the JAE. He is credited for introducing research methodology to the field of Linguistics in Spain, particularly the Scientific method and its application in teaching the Spanish language. This is clearly imprinted in his “Manual de Pronunciacion Espanola” (Spanish pronunciation manual) published in 1918.

As director of the experimental phonetics laboratory in the CEH he mentored many students. Two of these students, who later married, were the dialectologists Maria Josefa Canellada and Alonso Zamora Vicente. It was in this role that he sponsored and supported the research work to generate the Linguistic Atlas of the Iberian Peninsula or ALPI by its initials in Spanish. Aurelio Espinosa (son), Lorenzo Rodriguez-Castellano, Manuel Sanchis Guarner, Francesc de Borja Mo, Aníbal Otero were some of the researchers that comprised the team in addition to their Portuguese colleagues Rodrigo de Sá Nogueira, Armando Nobre de Gusmão y Luís Lindley Cintra.

== Works ==
- Manual de Pronunciacion Espanola, 1918
- Estudios de Fonologia Espanola, 1946
- Manual de Entonacion Espanola, 1948
- El Espanol de Puerto Rico, 1948
- Metrica Espanola, 1956 (y Metrica espanola resena historica y descriptiva, 1966)
- Documentos Linguisticos del Alto Aragon, 1957
- Arte del Verso, 1959
- Atlas Linguistico de la Peninsula Iberica, 1962
- La voz y la entonacion de los personajes literarios, 1976
