= Revista de Filología Española =

Philology journal

- Discipline: Philology
- Language: Spanish

Publication details
- History: 1914–present
- Publisher: Spanish National Research Council (Spain)
- Frequency: Biannual
- Open access: Yes
- License: CC BY 4.0

Standard abbreviations
- ISO 4: Rev. Filol. Esp.

Indexing
- ISSN: 0210-9174 (print); 1988-8538 (web)
- LCCN: no2002060889
- OCLC no.: 1200564

Links
- Journal homepage; Online access; Online archive

The Revista de Filología Española (English: Journal of Spanish Philology) is a biannual peer-reviewed academic journal of philology, dialectology, and linguistics that was established in 1914 with Ramón Menéndez Pidal as founding editor-in-chief. It is published by the Spanish National Research Council. The journal is published in Spanish, though it occasionally admits articles in other Romance languages.

The Anejos de la Revista de Filología Española (English: Annexes of the Journal of Spanish Philology) are a collection of monographs on the same subject.

== Abstracting and indexing ==
The journal is abstracted and indexed in Scopus, the Arts & Humanities Citation Index, and Latindex's Catalogue, among other databases.

== See also ==
- RFE Phonetic Alphabet
