= Luís Lindley Cintra =

Luís Filipe Lindley Cintra ComL GCIP (5 March 1925 – 18 August 1991) was a prominent figure in Portuguese philology and linguistics. A prolific writer with over 80 published works. Another special interest was the relationship between Galician and Portuguese, as evinced by his study of the dialects of Madeira (1990) and his plan, together with Manuel de Paiva Boléo and José G. Herculano de Carvalho, for a linguistic-ethnographic atlas of Portugal and Galicia (1960). He is also co-author, with Celso Ferreira da Cunha, of a major work on Portuguese grammar, the Nova Gramática do Português Contemporâneo.

== Biography ==
Lindley Cintra earned his master's degree in Romance philology from the University of Lisbon faculty of letters in 1946 with a dissertation on the poet António Nobre, followed by a doctorate in 1951. Besides having a significant role in mentoring researchers and instructors, he established the university's department of General and Romance Linguistics (Departamento de Linguística Geral e Românica) and was instrumental in reorganizing the Centre for Philological Studies (Centro de Estudos Filológicos), known since 1976 as the University of Lisbon Linguistics Centre (Centro de Linguística da Universidade de Lisboa).

Lindley Cintra is inextricably associated with the study and teaching of the Portuguese language, and his numerous works attest to his intellectual and scientific activity. He was the father of Portuguese film actor Luís Miguel Cintra and Portuguese poet Manuel Cintra.

== Distinctions ==
=== National orders ===
- Commander of the Order of Liberty (24 September 1983)
- Grand Cross of the Order of Public Instruction (28 June 1988)
