= Rafael Lapesa =

Spanish philologist (1908–2001)

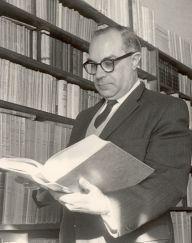
- Born: Rafael Lapesa Melgar; 8 February 1908; Valencia, Spain
- Died: 1 February 2001 (aged 92); Madrid, Spain
- Occupation: Philologist
- Writing career
- Language: Spanish
- Notable awards: Prince of Asturias Award for Literature; 1986

Seat k of the Real Academia Española
- In office 21 March 1954 – 1 February 2001
- Preceded by: Ángel González Palencia
- Succeeded by: José Antonio Pascual

Director of the Real Academia Española (interim)
- In office 14 January 1988 – 1 December 1988
- Preceded by: Pedro Laín Entralgo
- Succeeded by: Manuel Alvar

Rafael Lapesa Melgar (February 8, 1908 – February 1, 2001) was a Spanish philologist, a historian of language and of Spanish literature.

== Early life ==
He was born in Valencia on February 8, 1908. is family moved to Madrid when he was eight. By 1930, he had earned his professorship (cátedra) for his work on the medieval dialect of the western Asturias.

== Career ==
At the Centro de Estudios Históricos he was under the guidance of Ramón Menéndez Pidal, Tomás Navarro Tomás and Américo Castro. He had met Pilar Lago de Couceiro while both were students. She worked at the Tribunal de Cuentas and he worked for an insurance company. They married in 1932.

In Madrid from 1932 to 1941, he was a professor of Spanish Language and Literature. In addition, during the Civil War, he taught classes of republican soldiers how to read and write. By 1942, he had moved to the university at Oviedo, and from 1942 to 1947 he was at Salamanca.

Back in Madrid at the Complutense University of Madrid, he was Professor of the History of the Spanish Language from 1947 to 1978.

He became associated with the Seminario de Lexicografía de la Real Academia Española in 1947, serving as the Director from 1969 to 1981. There, he participated on the Diccionario histórico de la lengua española. Travelling widely, he was visiting professor at many universities in Europe, North America and South America. He also received numerous academic honours and other awards like the French Légion d'honneur and the Prince of Asturias Award for Literature.

== Selected works ==
- Rafael Lapesa, Historia de la lengua española (Madrid: Escelicer 1942, preface by Ramón Menéndez Pidal; 9th ed., Madrid: Gredos 1991)
- Rafael Lapesa, Historia lingűística y historia general (Madrid 1958)
- Rafael Lapesa, Sobre el texto y lenguaje de algunas "jarchyas" mozárabes (Madrid: Impr. S. Aguirre Torre 1960)
- Rafael Lapesa, Le dictionnaire historique de la langue espagnole (Paris 1960)
- Rafael Lapesa, El andaluz y el español de América (Madrid 1964)
- Rafael Lapesa, De la Edad Media a nuestros días (Madrid 1967)
- Rafael Lapesa, Generaciones y Semblanzas de filólogos españoles (1998)
- Rafael Lapesa and Emilio García Gómez, En el centario del nacimiento de don Miguel Asín (Madrid: CSIC 1969)
- Rafael Lapesa and Constantino García, Léxico hispánico primativo: siglos VII-XII (Pozuelo de Alarcon: Espasa-Calpe 2003)

== See also ==
- Spanish language
- History of the Spanish language
