= Ramón Menéndez Pidal =

Spanish philologist and historian (1869–1968)

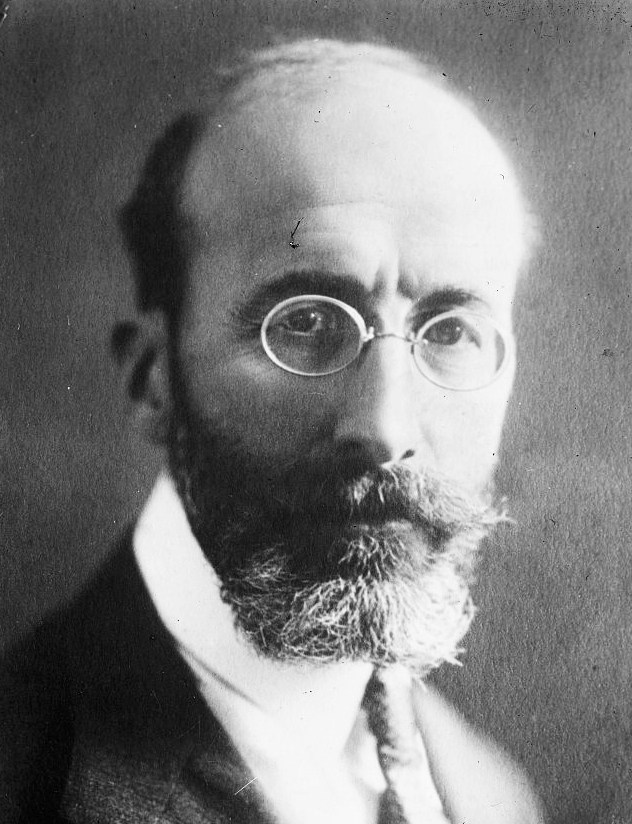
- Born: 13 March 1869; A Coruña, Spain
- Died: 14 November 1968 (aged 99); Madrid, Spain
- Education: Complutense University of Madrid

Seat b of the Real Academia Española
- In office 19 October 1902 – 14 November 1968
- Preceded by: Víctor Balaguer i Cirera
- Succeeded by: Vicente Enrique y Tarancón

Director of the Real Academia Española
- In office 23 December 1925 – 1939
- Preceded by: Antonio Maura
- Succeeded by: José María Pemán
- In office 4 December 1947 – 14 November 1968
- Preceded by: José María Pemán
- Succeeded by: Vicente García de Diego

Ramón Menéndez Pidal (Spanish: [raˈmom meˈnendeθ piˈðal]; 13 March 1869 – 14 November 1968) was a Spanish philologist and historian. He worked extensively on the history of the Spanish language and Spanish folklore and folk poetry. One of his main topics was the history and legend of El Cid. He was nominated for the Nobel Prize in 26 separate years, the most nominations of any person.

== Biography ==
Menéndez Pidal was born in A Coruña, Galicia, Spain. His father, Juan Menéndez Fernández, was a lawyer and magistrate from Asturias, and his mother was Ramona Pidal, also an Asturian. His older brother, Juan Menéndez Pidal, whom he outlived by more than fifty years, was also a literary scholar of the folk poetry of Asturias. Another older brother, Luis Menéndez Pidal, was a realist painter and professor of art history.

He studied at the University of Madrid. In 1899 he was appointed chair in Romance studies in the same university, a position that he held until his retirement in 1939. In 1900 he married María Goyri, who in 1896 became the first Spanish woman to receive a degree in Philosophy and later, in 1909, became the first woman to attain a non-medical doctorate at a Spanish university. They spent their honeymoon retracing the geographic locales of the Poem of the Cid (Cantar de Mio Cid).

Menéndez Pidal was elected to the Spanish Royal Academy (Real Academia Española) in 1901 and was elected director in 1925. However, he resigned in 1939 under pressure from academics who wanted a director more acceptable to the Franco regime. While neither Menéndez Pidal nor his wife took an anti-Franco position, the authorities were suspicious of María Goyri's liberal views. In December 1947 he was re-elected director unanimously, and he held the position for the rest of his life.

In 1910, he became the head of the philology section at the Centro de Estudios Históricos (Center for Historical Studies), a division of the liberal and Europe-oriented Junta para Ampliación de Estudios, which also had sections devoted to medicine, physics, chemistry, and mathematics. In 1914 the Centro founded the Revista de Filología Española (Journal of Spanish Philology), which would become the premier scholarly journal in the fields of linguistics and Medieval and Renaissance Spanish literature.

During the 1920s Menéndez Pidal published in rapid succession a series of major studies: Poesía juglaresca y juglares (1924) traced the development of minstrel poetry in medieval Spain. Orígenes del español (1926), a landmark in Romance linguistics, retraces the pre-literary phase of the Ibero-Romance dialects, and the "triumph" of Castilian. A ballad collection, designed for the general public, Flor nueva de romances viejos (1928) became a best seller, and includes some versions of ballads that Menéndez Pidal had authored himself. Finally, La España del Cid (1929) traced the career of the 11th century warrior lord, Rodrigo Díaz de Vivar ("El Cid"), in a scholarly biography of some 1000 pages.

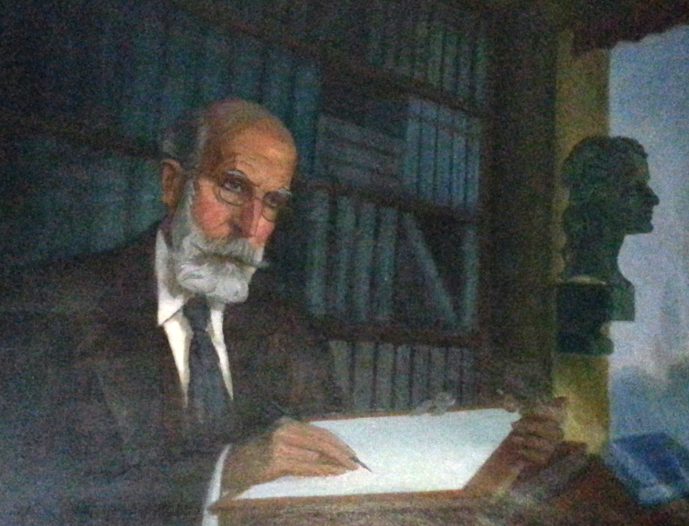
Portrait of Ramón Menéndez Pidal by Emeric Tauss Torday, 1956.

After the Spanish Civil War, Menéndez Pidal forcibly became an "independent scholar" and revised much of his earlier work. However, from this period is his sweeping essay "Los españoles en la Historia," a study that traces the struggle between liberals and conservatives in the entire course of Spanish history. He also summarised his findings on the ballads in Romancero Hispánico: Teoría e historia (1953) and applied his theory of the origins of epic poetry to French literature in La Chanson de Roland y el neotradicionalismo (1959).

Menéndez Pidal worked for many years on a comprehensive history of the Spanish language, which he could not complete in his lifetime; the two volumes have been published posthumously as "Historia de la lengua española" (2005).

He was nominated for the Nobel Prize in Literature a record 154 times, but never won. In 1956 alone, the Nobel committee received 95 nominations for Menéndez Pidal, including nominations from the Royal Spanish Academy, Real Academia de la Historia and a number of professors from various universities.

He was an elected international member of both the American Academy of Arts and Sciences and the American Philosophical Society.

== Major works ==
- La leyenda de los siete infantes de Lara (1896)
- Crónicas generales de España (1898)
- Manual elemental de Gramática histórica española (1904)
- El dialecto leonés (1906)
- Cantar de mio Cid: texto, gramática y vocabulario (1908–1912)
- Orígenes del español (1926)
- La España del Cid (1929)
- La idea imperial de Carlos V (1938)
- Reliquias de la poesía épica española (1952)
- Romancero hispánico (1953)
- En torno a la lengua vasca (1962), collection of earlier works
- El padre Las Casas: su doble personalidad (1963)
