= Spanish language in the United States =

United States Spanish
- U.S. Spanish
- Español estadounidense
- Pronunciation: [espaˈɲol estaðowniˈðense]
- Native to: United States
- Speakers: 44.9 million (2024)
- Language family: Indo-European: Italic; Latino-Faliscan; Romance; Western; Ibero-Romance; West Iberian; Castilian; Spanish; United States Spanish
- Early forms: Old Latin: Classical Latin; Vulgar Latin; Old Spanish; Early Modern Spanish
- Dialects: Sabine River; Neomexican; Californio; Chicano; Isleño
- Writing system: Latin (Spanish alphabet)

Official status
- Regulated by: North American Academy of the Spanish Language

Language codes
- ISO 639-1: es
- ISO 639-2: spa
- ISO 639-3: –
- Glottolog: None
- IETF: es-US
- Percentage of the U.S. population aged 5 and over who speak the Spanish language at home in 2019, by states.

Spanish is the second most spoken language in the United States, after English. Approximately 45 million people aged five or older speak Spanish at home, representing about 14% of the U.S. population. Broader estimates place the total number of Spanish speakers—including native speakers, heritage speakers, and second-language speakers—at around 59 million, or roughly 18% of the population. The North American Academy of the Spanish Language (Academia Norteamericana de la Lengua Española) serves as the official institution dedicated to the promotion and regulation of the Spanish language in the United States.

In the United States, the number of Hispanophones exceeds the combined total of speakers of French, German, Italian, Portuguese, Hawaiian, the Indo-Aryan languages, the various varieties of Chinese, Arabic and the Native American languages. The U.S. also has the second-largest Spanish-speaking population in the world, after Mexico. According to the 2024 American Community Survey conducted by the U.S. Census Bureau, 44.9 million people aged five or older speak Spanish at home — more than twice as many as in 1990. Spanish is also the most studied language in the United States after English, with approximately 8 million students enrolled in Spanish courses at various educational levels. The use and importance of Spanish in the United States has increased significantly as Hispanics are one of the fastest-growing ethnic groups in the country. While the proportion of Hispanics who use Spanish in major urban areas has declined, the absolute number of Spanish speakers nationwide, as well as the use of Spanish at home, continues to grow annually.

Spanish has been spoken in what is now the United States since the 15th century, with the arrival of Spanish colonization in North America. Colonizers settled in areas that would later become Florida, Texas, Colorado, New Mexico, Arizona, Nevada, and California as well as in what is now the Commonwealth of Puerto Rico. The Spanish explorers explored areas of 42 of the future US states leaving behind a varying range of Hispanic legacy in North America. Western regions of the Louisiana Territory were also under Spanish rule between 1763 and 1800, after the French and Indian War, which further extended Spanish influences throughout what is now the United States. These areas were incorporated into the United States in the first half of the 19th century, and the first constitutions of the states of California and New Mexico were written in both Spanish and English. Spanish was later reinforced in the country by the acquisition of Puerto Rico in 1898. Despite the rise of the English-only movement, Hispanophone publications resisted the acculturation to Anglo-Saxon culture and the English language, and waves of immigration from Mexico, Cuba, Venezuela, El Salvador, and elsewhere in Hispanic America have strengthened the prominence of Spanish in the country to the present day.

== History ==
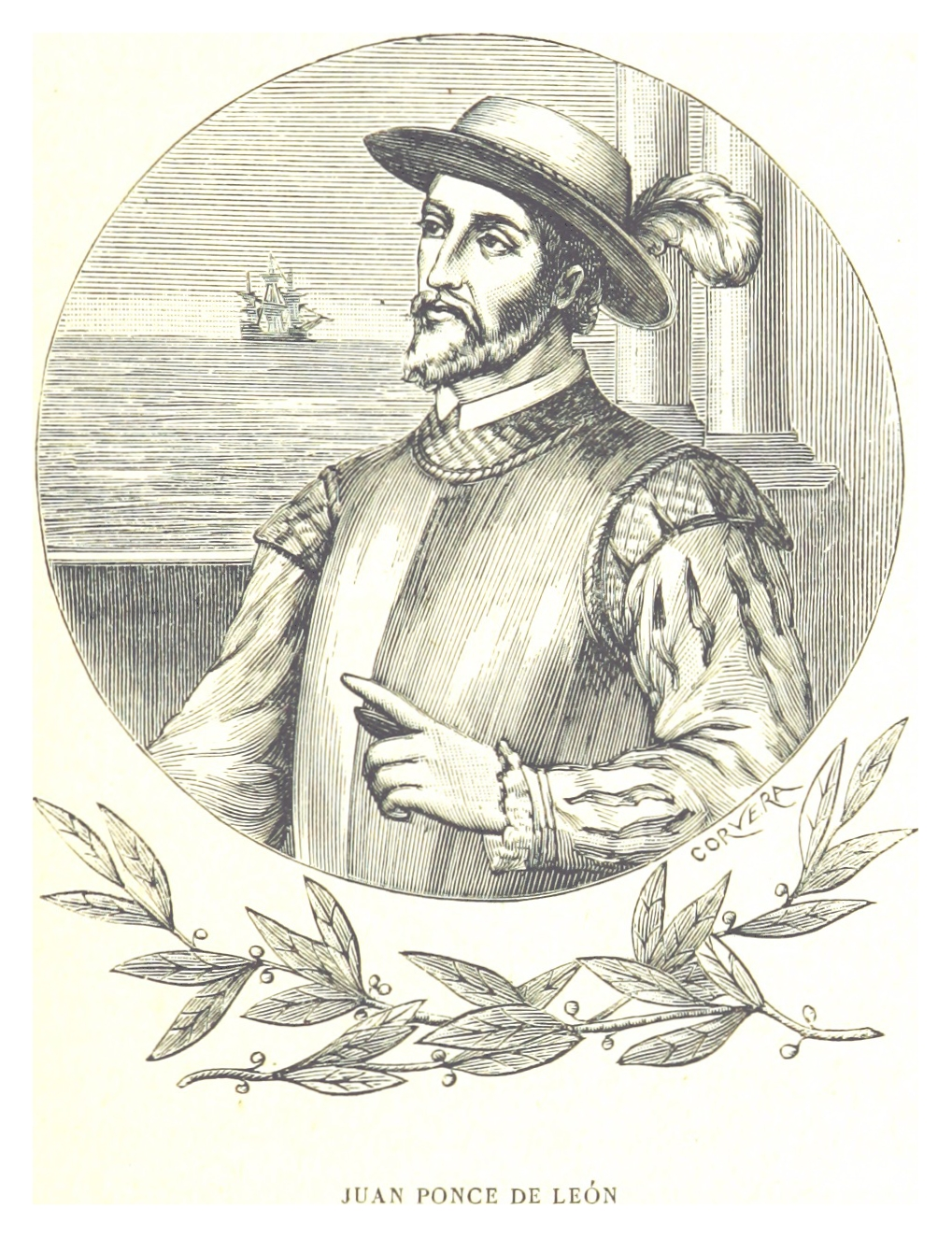
Juan Ponce de León (Santervás de Campos, Valladolid, Spain). He was one of the first Europeans to arrive to the current United States because he led the first European expedition to Florida, which he named. Spanish was the first European language spoken in the territory that is now the United States.

=== Early Spanish settlements ===
The Spanish arrived in what would later become the United States in 1493, with the Spanish arrival to Puerto Rico. Ponce de León explored Florida in 1513. In 1565, the Spaniards founded St. Augustine, Florida. The Spanish later left but others moved in and it is the oldest continuously occupied European settlement in the continental United States. Juan Ponce de León founded San Juan, Puerto Rico, in 1508. Historically, the Spanish-speaking population increased because of territorial annexation of lands claimed earlier by the Spanish Empire and by wars with Mexico and by land purchases.

=== Spanish Louisiana ===
During the late 18th and early 19th centuries, land claimed by Spain encompassed a large part of the contemporary U.S. territory, including the French colony of Louisiana from 1769 to 1800. In order to further establish and defend Louisiana, Spanish Governor Bernardo de Gálvez recruited Canary Islanders to emigrate to North America. Between November 1778 and July 1779, around 1600 Isleños arrived in New Orleans, and another group of about 300 came in 1783. By 1780, the four Isleño communities were already founded. When Louisiana was sold to the United States, its Spanish, Creole and Cajun inhabitants became U.S. citizens, and continued to speak Spanish or French. In 1813, George Ticknor started a program of Spanish Studies at Harvard University. Spain also founded settlements along the Sabine River, to protect the border with French Louisiana. The towns of Nacogdoches, Texas and Los Adaes were founded as part of this settlement, and the people there spoke a dialect descended from rural Mexican Spanish, which is now almost completely extinct. Although it's commonly thought in Nacogdoches that the Hispanic residents of the Sabine River area are isleños, their Spanish dialect is derived from rural Mexican Spanish, and their ancestors came from Mexico and other parts of Texas.

=== Annexation of Texas and the Mexican–American War ===
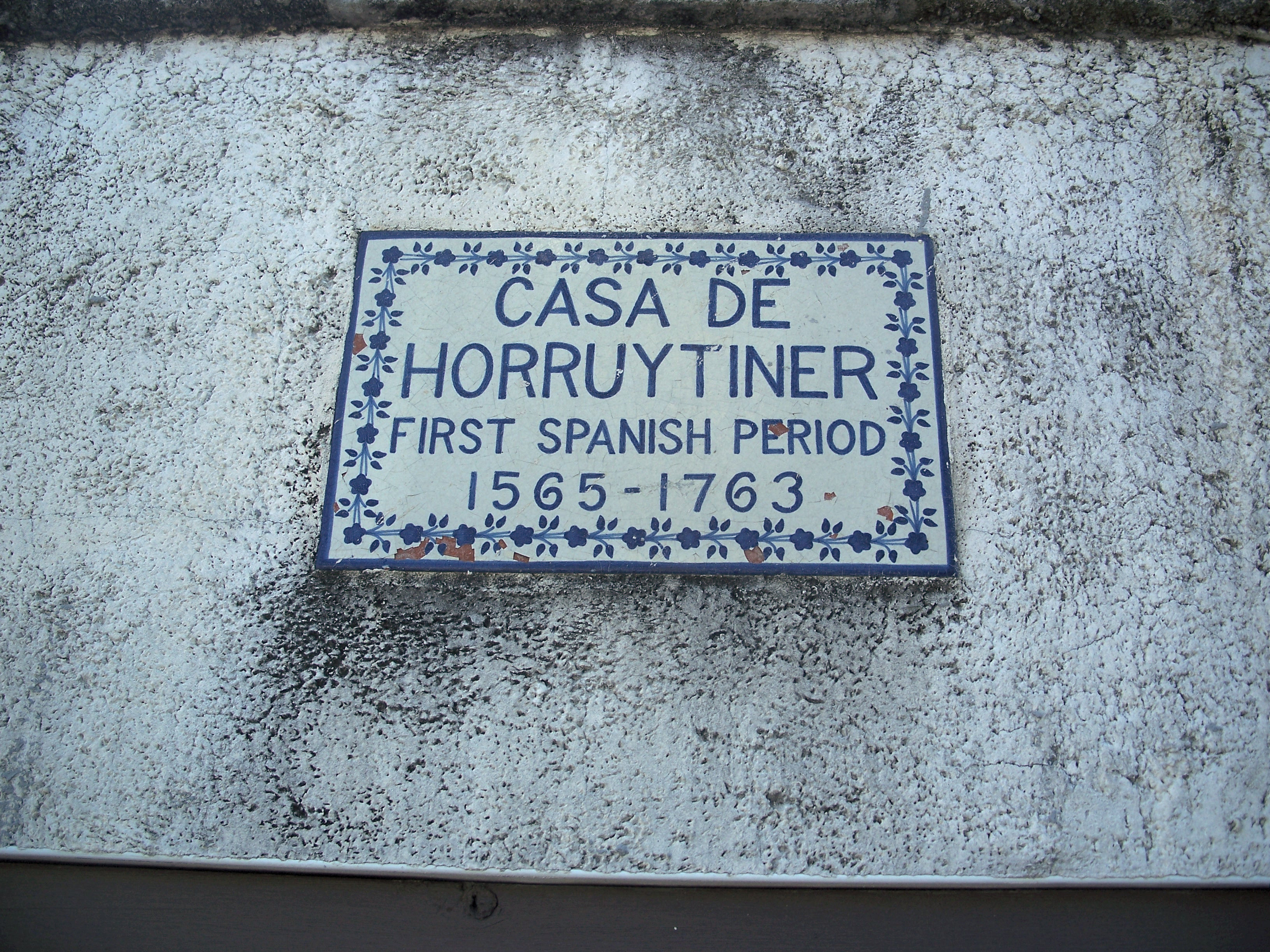
Spanish language heritage in Florida dates back to 1565, with the founding of Saint Augustine, Florida. Spanish was the first European language spoken in Florida.

In 1821, after Mexico's War of Independence from Spain, Texas was part of the United Mexican States as the state of Coahuila y Tejas. A large influx of Americans soon followed, originally with the approval of Mexico's president. In 1836, the now largely "American" Texans fought a war of independence from the central government of Mexico. The arrivals from the US objected to Mexico's abolition of slavery. They declared independence and established the Republic of Texas. In 1846, the Republic dissolved when Texas entered the United States of America as a state. By 1850, fewer than 16,000 or 7.5% of Texans were of Mexican descent, Spanish-speaking people (both Mexicans and non-Spanish European settlers, including German Texans) were outnumbered six to one by English-speaking settlers (both Americans and other immigrant Europeans).

After the Mexican War of Independence from Spain, California, Nevada, Arizona, Utah, western Colorado and southwestern Wyoming also became part of the Mexican territory of Alta California. Most of New Mexico, western Texas, southern Colorado, southwestern Kansas, and the Oklahoma panhandle were part of the territory of Santa Fe de Nuevo México. The geographical isolation and unique political history of this territory led to New Mexican Spanish differing notably from both Spanish spoken in other parts of the United States of America and Spanish spoken in the present-day United Mexican States.

Mexico lost almost half of the northern territory gained from Spain in 1821 to the United States in the Mexican–American War (1846–1848). This included parts of contemporary Texas, and Colorado, Arizona, New Mexico, Wyoming, California, Nevada, and Utah. Although the lost territory was sparsely populated, the thousands of Spanish-speaking Mexicans subsequently became U.S. citizens.

The war-ending Treaty of Guadalupe Hidalgo (1848) does not explicitly address language. Although Spanish initially continued to be used in schools and government, the English-speaking American settlers who entered the Southwest established their language, culture, and law as dominant, displacing Spanish in the public sphere.

The California experience is illustrative. The first California constitutional convention in 1849 had eight Californio participants; the resulting state constitution was produced in English and Spanish, and it contained a clause requiring all published laws and regulations to be published in both languages. One of the first acts of the first California Legislature of 1850 was to authorize the appointment of a State Translator, who would be responsible for translating all state laws, decrees, documents, or orders into Spanish.

Such magnanimity did not last very long. As early as February 1850, California adopted the Anglo-American common law as the basis of the new state's legal system. In 1855, California declared that English would be the only medium of instruction in its schools. These policies were one way of ensuring the social and political dominance of Anglos.

The state's second constitutional convention in 1872 had no Spanish-speaking participants; the convention's English-speaking participants felt that the state's remaining minority of Spanish-speakers should simply learn English; and the convention ultimately voted 46–39 to revise the earlier clause so that all official proceedings would henceforth be published only in English.

Despite the displacement of Spanish from the public sphere, much of the border region, including most of Southern California, Arizona, New Mexico, and south Texas, was home to Spanish speaking communities until at least the beginning of the 20th century.

=== Spanish–American War (1898) ===
In 1898, consequent to the Spanish–American War, the United States took control of Cuba, Puerto Rico, Guam, and the Philippines as U.S. overseas territories. In 1902, Cuba became independent from the United States, while Puerto Rico remained a U.S. territory. The U.S. government required government services to be bilingual in Spanish and English, and attempted to introduce English-medium education to Puerto Rico, but the latter effort was unsuccessful.

Once Puerto Rico was granted autonomy in 1948, even mainlander officials who came to Puerto Rico were forced to learn Spanish. Only 20% of Puerto Rico's residents understand English, and although the island's government had a policy of official bilingualism, it was repealed in favor of a Spanish-only policy in 1991. This policy was reversed in 1993 when a pro-statehood party ousted a pro-independence party from the commonwealth government.

Spanish disappeared in several countries and US territories during the 20th century, notably in the Philippines and in the Pacific Island countries of Guam, Micronesia, Palau, the Northern Marianas islands, and the Marshall Islands.

=== Hispanics as the largest minority in the United States ===
The relatively recent but large influx of Spanish-speakers to the United States has increased the overall total of Spanish-speakers in the country. They form majorities and large minorities in many political districts, especially in California, Arizona, New Mexico and Texas (the U.S. states bordering Mexico), and also in South Florida.

Mexicans first moved to the United States as refugees in the turmoil of the Mexican Revolution from 1910 to 1917, but many more emigrated later for economic reasons. The large majority of Mexicans are in the former Mexican-controlled areas in the Southwest. From 1942 to 1962, the Bracero program would provide for mass Mexican migration to the United States.

At over 5 million, Puerto Ricans are the second largest Spanish-speaking ethnicity. They are the least likely to be proficient in Spanish, but millions of Puerto Rican Americans living in the U.S. mainland are fluent in Spanish. Puerto Ricans are natural-born U.S. citizens, and many Puerto Ricans have migrated to New York City, Orlando, Philadelphia, and other areas of the Eastern United States, increasing the Spanish-speaking populations and in some areas being the majority of the Hispanophone population, especially in Central Florida. In Hawaii, where Puerto Rican farm laborers and Mexican ranchers have settled since the late 19th century, seven percent of the islands' people are either Hispanic or Hispanophone or both.

The Cuban Revolution of 1959 created a community of Cuban exiles who opposed the Communist revolution, many of whom left for the United States. In 1963, the Ford Foundation established the first bilingual education program in the United States for the children of Cuban exiles in Miami-Dade County, Florida. The Immigration and Nationality Act of 1965 boosted immigration from Hispanophone American countries, and in 1968, Congress passed the Bilingual Education Act. Most of these one million Cuban Americans settled in southern and central Florida, while other Cubans live in the Northeastern United States; most are fluent in Spanish. In the city of Miami today Spanish is the first language mostly due to Cuban immigration. Likewise, the Nicaraguan Revolution and subsequent Contra War created a migration of Nicaraguans fleeing the Sandinista government and civil war to the United States in the late 1980s. Most of these Nicaraguans migrated to Florida and California.

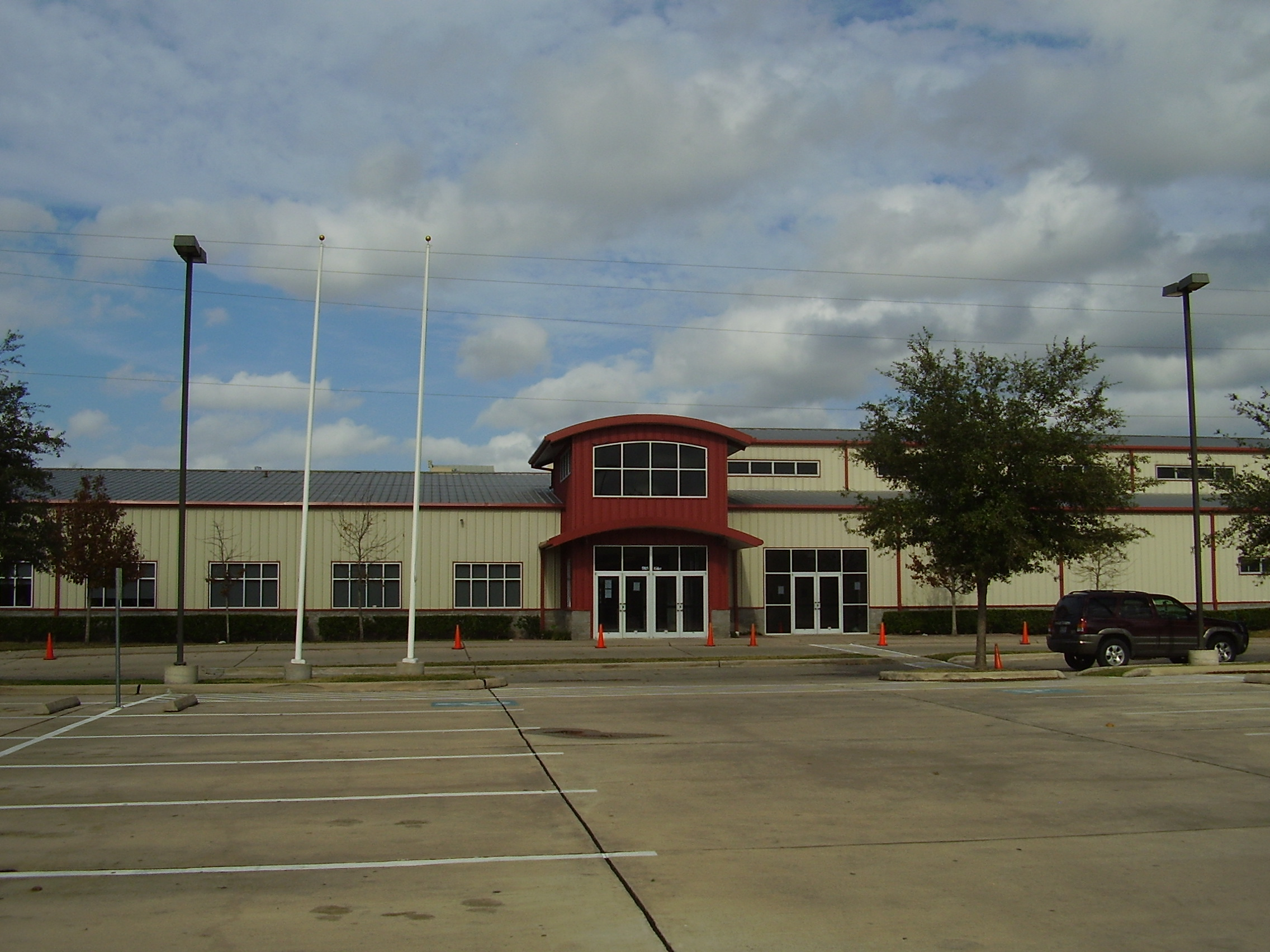
SER-Niños Charter School, a K–8 bilingual public school in Houston, Texas. Bilingual education is popular in school districts with large numbers of Spanish-speakers.

The exodus of Salvadorans was a result of both economic and political problems. The largest immigration wave occurred as a result of the Salvadoran Civil War in the 1980s, in which 20 to 30 percent of El Salvador's population emigrated. About 50 percent, or up to 500,000 of those who escaped, headed to the United States, which was already home to over 10,000 Salvadorans, making Salvadoran Americans the fourth-largest Spanish-speaking nationality in the US, after the Mexican-American majority, stateside Puerto Ricans, and Cubans.

As civil wars engulfed several Central American countries in the 1980s, hundreds of thousands of Salvadorans fled their country and came to the United States. Between 1980 and 1990, the Salvadoran immigrant population in the United States increased nearly fivefold from 94,000 to 465,000. The number of Salvadoran immigrants in the United States continued to grow in the 1990s and 2000s as a result of family reunification and new arrivals fleeing a series of natural disasters that hit El Salvador, including earthquakes and hurricanes. By 2008, there were about 1.1 million Salvadoran immigrants in the United States.

Until the 20th century, there was no clear record of the number of Venezuelans who emigrated to the United States. Between the 18th and early 19th centuries, there were many European immigrants who went to Venezuela, only to later migrate to the United States along with their children and grandchildren who were born and/or grew up in Venezuela speaking Spanish. From 1910 to 1930, it is estimated that over 4,000 South Americans each year emigrated to the United States; however, there are few specific figures indicating these statistics. Many Venezuelans settled in the United States with hopes of receiving a better education, only to remain there following graduation. They are frequently joined by relatives. However, since the early 1980s, the reasons for Venezuelan emigration have changed to include hopes of earning a higher salary and due to the economic fluctuations in Venezuela which also promoted an important migration of Venezuelan professionals to the US. In the 2000s, dissident Venezuelans migrated to South Florida, especially the suburbs of Doral and Weston. Other main states with Venezuelan American populations are, according to the 1990 census, New York, California, Texas, New Jersey, Massachusetts and Maryland.

Refugees from Spain also migrated to the U.S. due to the Spanish Civil War (1936–1939) and political instability under the regime of Francisco Franco that lasted until 1975. The majority of Spaniards settled in Florida, Texas, California, New Jersey, New York City, Chicago, and Puerto Rico.

The publication of data by the United States Census Bureau in 2003 revealed that Hispanics were the largest minority in the United States and caused a flurry of press speculation in Spain about the position of Spanish in the United States. That year, the Instituto Cervantes, an organization created by the Spanish government in 1991 to promote Spanish language around the globe, established a branch in New York. In total, there were 36,995,602 people aged five or older in the United States who spoke Spanish at home (12.8% of the total U.S. population) according to the 2010 census.

== Demographics ==
Spanish-speakers in the United States
Year	Number of native Spanish-speakers	Percent of US population
1980	11 million	5%
1990	17.3 million	7%
2000	28.1 million	10%
2010	37 million	12.8%
2015	40 million	13.3%
2023	43.4 million	13.7%

As of 2023, according to American Community Survey statistics, the number of Spanish speakers at home amounted to 43.4 million. An additional 12 million American residents are bilingual. This total number makes the United States the second largest Hispanophone country in the world, including ahead of Colombia, Spain and Argentina. Despite this, Spanish has no official status in the country other than the (non-state) territory of Puerto Rico, where it is also the most commonly used language including in local governance and education. English was and is the dominant language of business, education, government, religion, media, culture, and the public sphere in the contiguous United States. Virtually all state and federal government agencies as well as large corporations use English as their internal working language, especially at the management level, and English is as of 2025 the de jure official language of the United States.

Spanish, however, retains some use in some official contexts, for example some states such as Arizona, California, Florida, New Mexico, and Texas, provide bilingual legislative notices and official documents in Spanish. Also, the annual State of the Union Address and other presidential speeches are translated into Spanish, following the precedent set by the Clinton administration in the 1990s. Moreover, non-Hispanic American origin politicians fluent in Spanish speak in Spanish to majority-Hispanophone constituencies. Notably in 2013, Republican senator Marco Rubio gave his response to the State of the Union address in Spanish, along with English. It marked the first time that a high-profile speech was given in two languages by the same person. The official whitehouse.gov website previously had a Spanish-language version alongside the English-language, but has been suspended under both Trump administrations as part of support for the English-only movement.

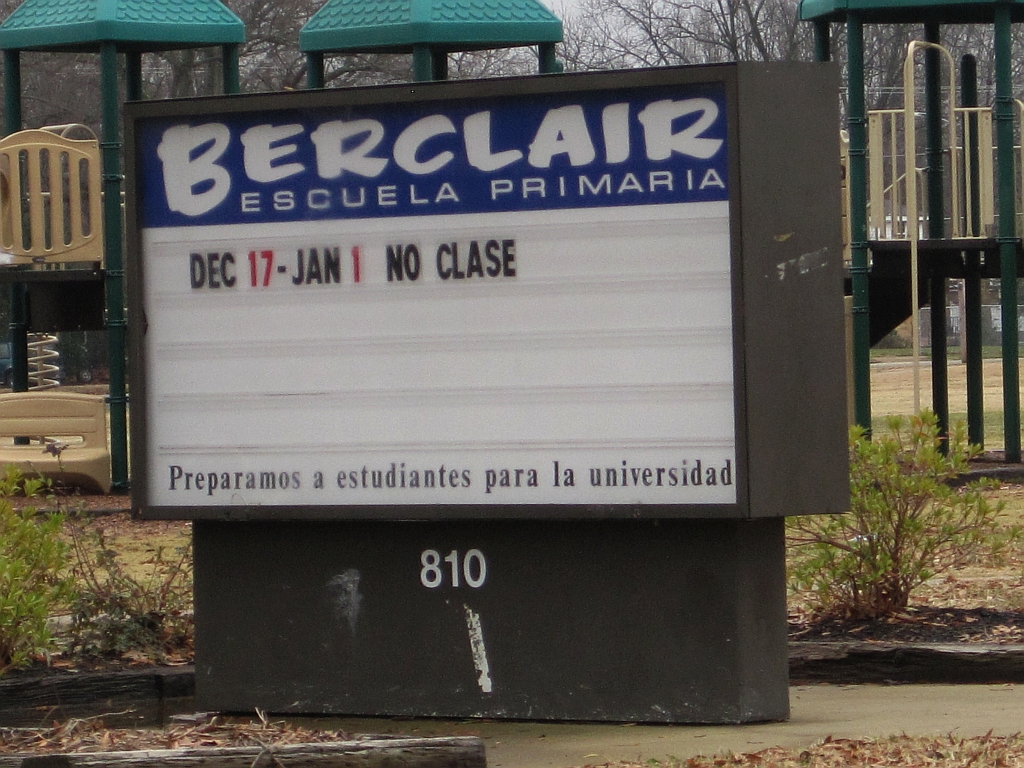
Public elementary school sign in Spanish in Memphis, Tennessee (although in Spanish, DEC and JAN would be DIC and ENE respectively).

The language is most often spoken by Americans with family origins from Spanish-speaking countries: 94 percent of Spanish-speakers, according to 2017 ACS data. An additional 2.6 million Spanish-speakers do not identify as Hispanic or Latino ethnically. Of the latter, approximately 59% of Hispanophones trace their ancestry to non-Spanish European countries while approximately 12% are of African-American descent. 26% of non-Hispanic Spanish speakers reside in a household where at least one other member is Hispanic.

The native Spanish-speaking population greatly differ between the states and is most prominent in Southwestern United States and Florida. According to Census Bureau statistics from 2019, Texas (29.2% speaking Spanish at home), California (28.8%) and New Mexico (26.5%) had the largest proportions of Spanish-speakers of the fifty states. In urban metropolitan areas, the largest Hispanophone communities are 4.4 million in Los Angeles metro (36% of its population), 3.6 million in New York metro (20.2%), 2.4 million in Miami metro (42.8%) 1.9 million in Houston metro (30.3%), 1.6 million in Dallas metro (23.1%), and 1.5 million each in Chicago metro (17.4%) and Inland Empire (35.1%).

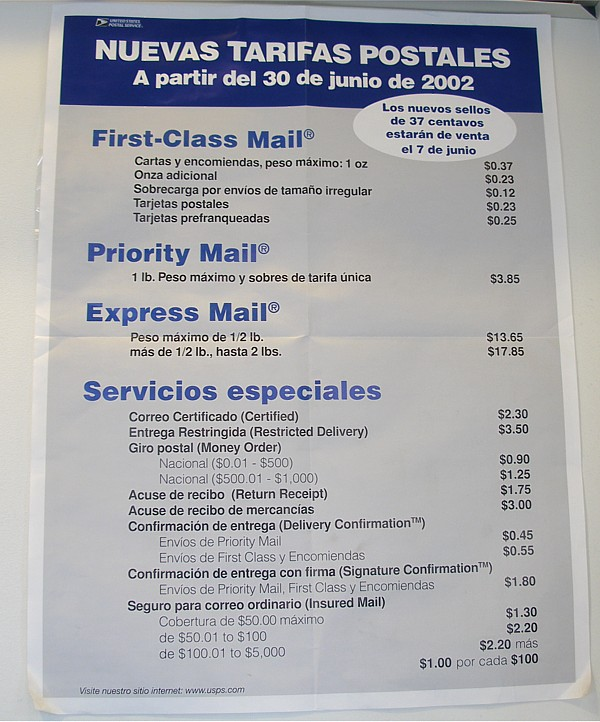
Federal agencies such as the US Postal Service translate information into Spanish.

Spanish-language mass media (such as Univisión, Telemundo, and the former Azteca América) support the use of Spanish, although they increasingly serve bilingual audiences. In addition, the North American Free Trade Agreement (NAFTA) makes many American manufacturers use multilingual product labeling in English, French, and Spanish, three of the four official languages of the Organization of American States (OAS). Besides the specialized businesses that have long catered to Hispanophone immigrants, a small but increasing number of mainstream American retailers also now advertise bilingually in Spanish-speaking areas and offer bilingual customer services. One common indicator of such businesses is Se Habla Español, which means "Spanish Is Spoken".

=== Bilingualism ===
In 2015, the proportion of Hispanics in the country who spoke Spanish at home was 73 percent (down from 78 percent in 2000). Generally, Hispanics (13.4% of the 2002 US population) are bilingual to a degree. A Simmons Market Research survey recorded that 19 percent of Hispanics speak only Spanish, 9 percent speak only English, 55 percent have limited English proficiency, and 17 percent are fully English-Spanish bilingual.

=== Language shift ===
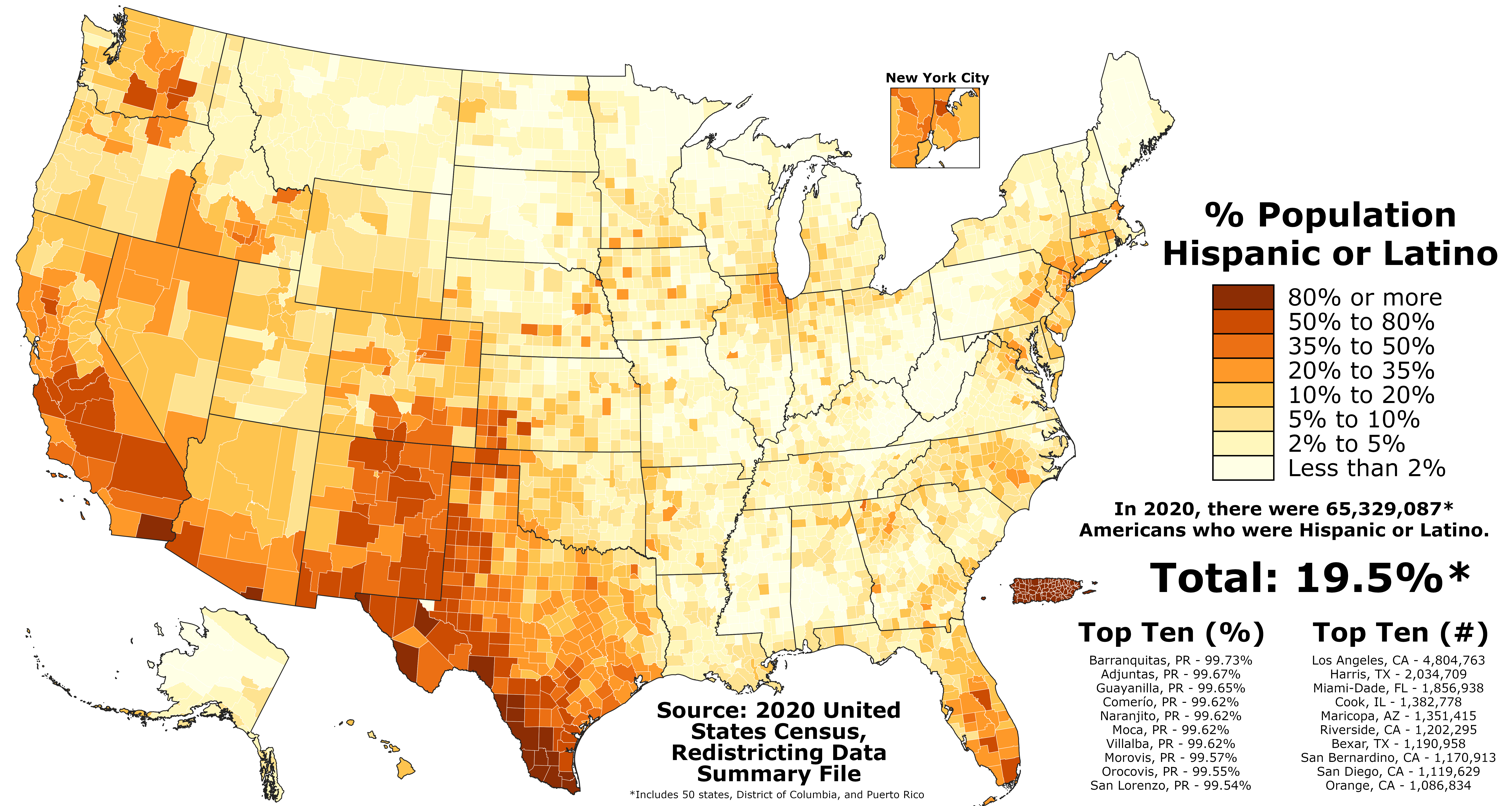
Distribution of Hispanics in the U.S. in the 2020 United States census.

As the most commonly spoken language after English in the United States, continued immigration has been a key reason for the continued presence and use of Spanish, since the descendants of early immigrants and those incorporated into the United States as a result of annexation have largely undergone language shift to English. Historically, immigrants' languages tend to disappear or to be reduced by generational assimilation, with English monolingualism predominant by the third generation. This pattern has largely held steady among more recent immigrants—including Spanish-speakers—and their descendants.

== Spanish across the states ==
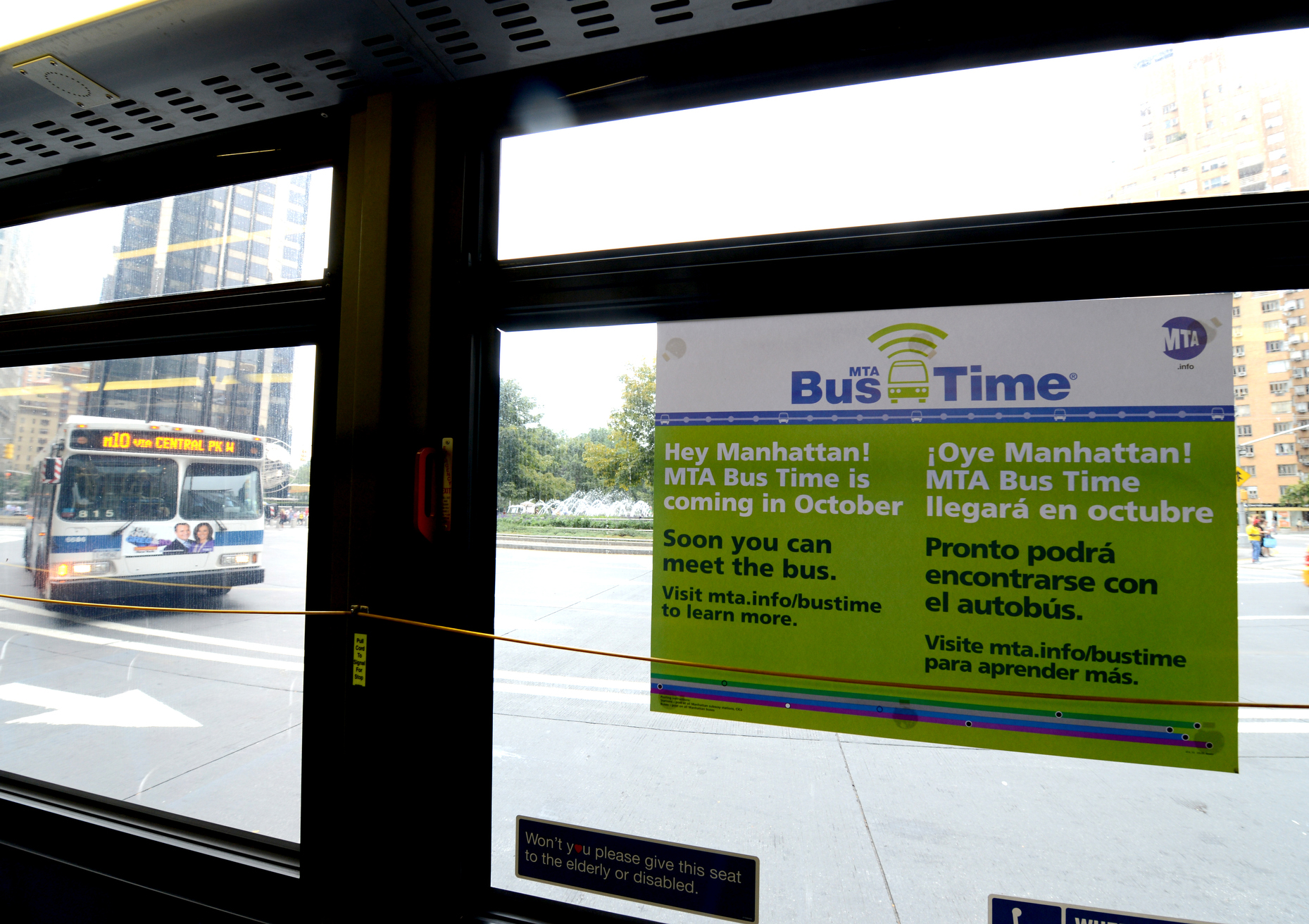
Bilingual bus information sign in Manhattan - 1 in 5 people in the New York-Newark-Jersey City region speak Spanish at home

=== California ===
California's first constitution recognized Spanish-language rights:

All laws, decrees, regulations, and provisions emanating from any of the three supreme powers of this State, which from their nature require publication, shall be published in English and Spanish.

— California Constitution, 1849, Art. 11 Sec. 21.

By 1870, English-speakers were a majority in California; in 1879, the state promulgated a new constitution with a clause under which all official proceedings were to be conducted exclusively in English, which remained in effect until 1966. In 1986, California voters added a new constitutional clause by referendum:

English is the official language of the State of California.

— California Constitution, Art. 3, Sec. 6

Spanish remains widely spoken throughout the state, and many government forms, documents, and services are bilingual in English and Spanish. Although all official proceedings are to be conducted in English, the California courts system offers accommodations to Spanish speakers:

A person unable to understand English who is charged with a crime has a right to an interpreter throughout the proceedings.

— California Constitution, Art. 1. Sec. 14

=== Arizona ===
Throughout the history of the Southwestern U.S., the controversial issue of language as part of cultural rights and bilingual state government representation has caused sociocultural friction between Anglophones and Hispanophones. The State of Arizona, like its neighbors in the Southwest, has had close linguistic and cultural ties with Mexico. The state, except for the 1853 Gadsden Purchase, was part of the New Mexico Territory until 1863, when the western half was made into Arizona Territory. The area of the former Gadsden Purchase was largely Spanish-speaking until the 1940s, although the Tucson area had a higher ratio of Anglophones (including Mexican Americans who were fluent in English). The continuous arrival of Mexican settlers increased the number of Spanish speakers.

=== Florida ===
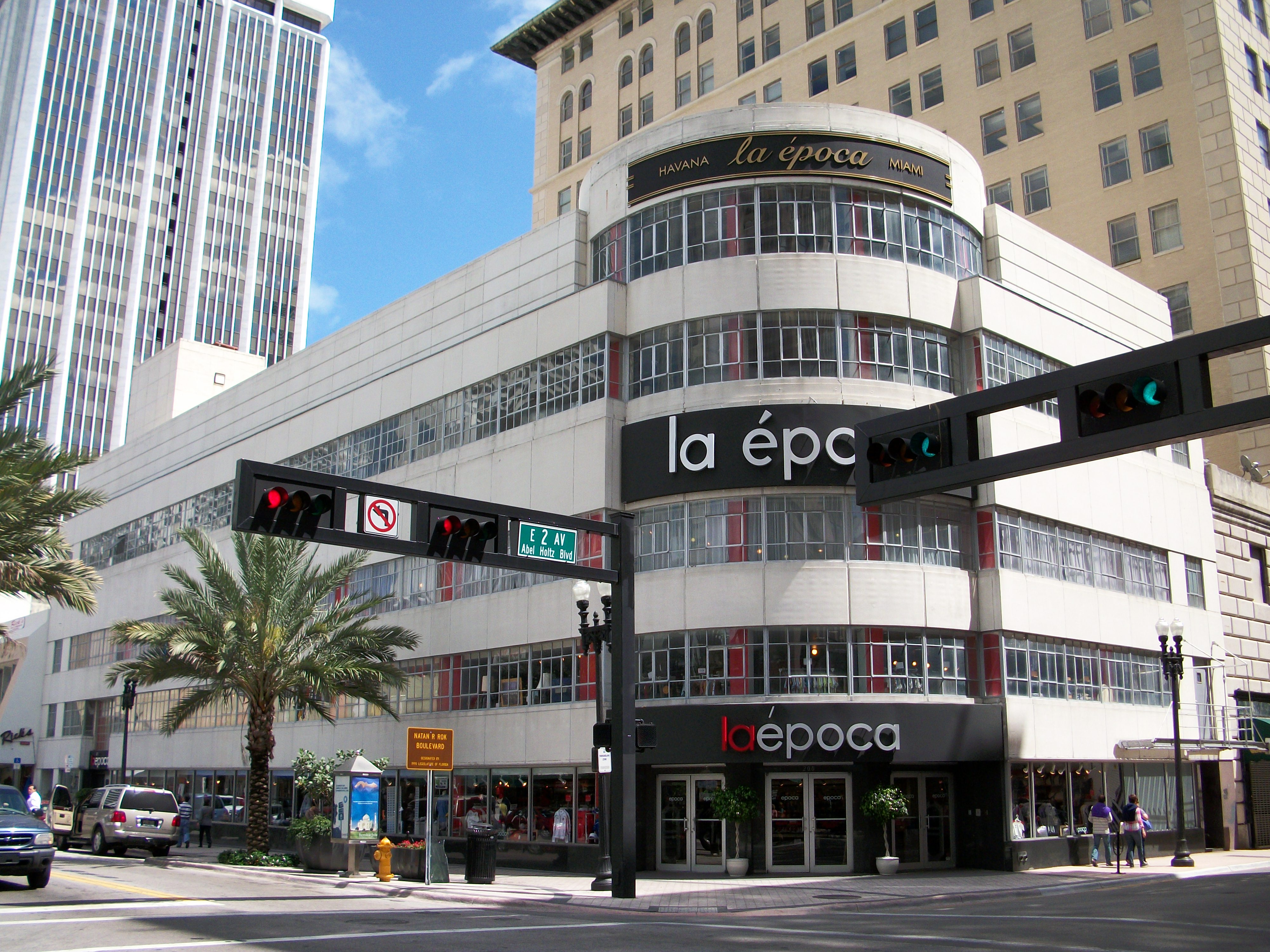
La Época is an upscale Miami department store, whose Spanish name comes from Cuba. La Época is an example of the many businesses started and owned by Spanish-speakers in the United States.

During the 1990s and 2000s, Miami emerged as a global city with a Spanish/English bilingual population. Today, most of the residents of the Miami metropolitan area speak Spanish at home, and the influence of Spanish can even be seen in many features of the local dialect of English. Miami is considered the "capital of Latin US" for its many bilingual corporations, banks, and media outlets that cater to international business.

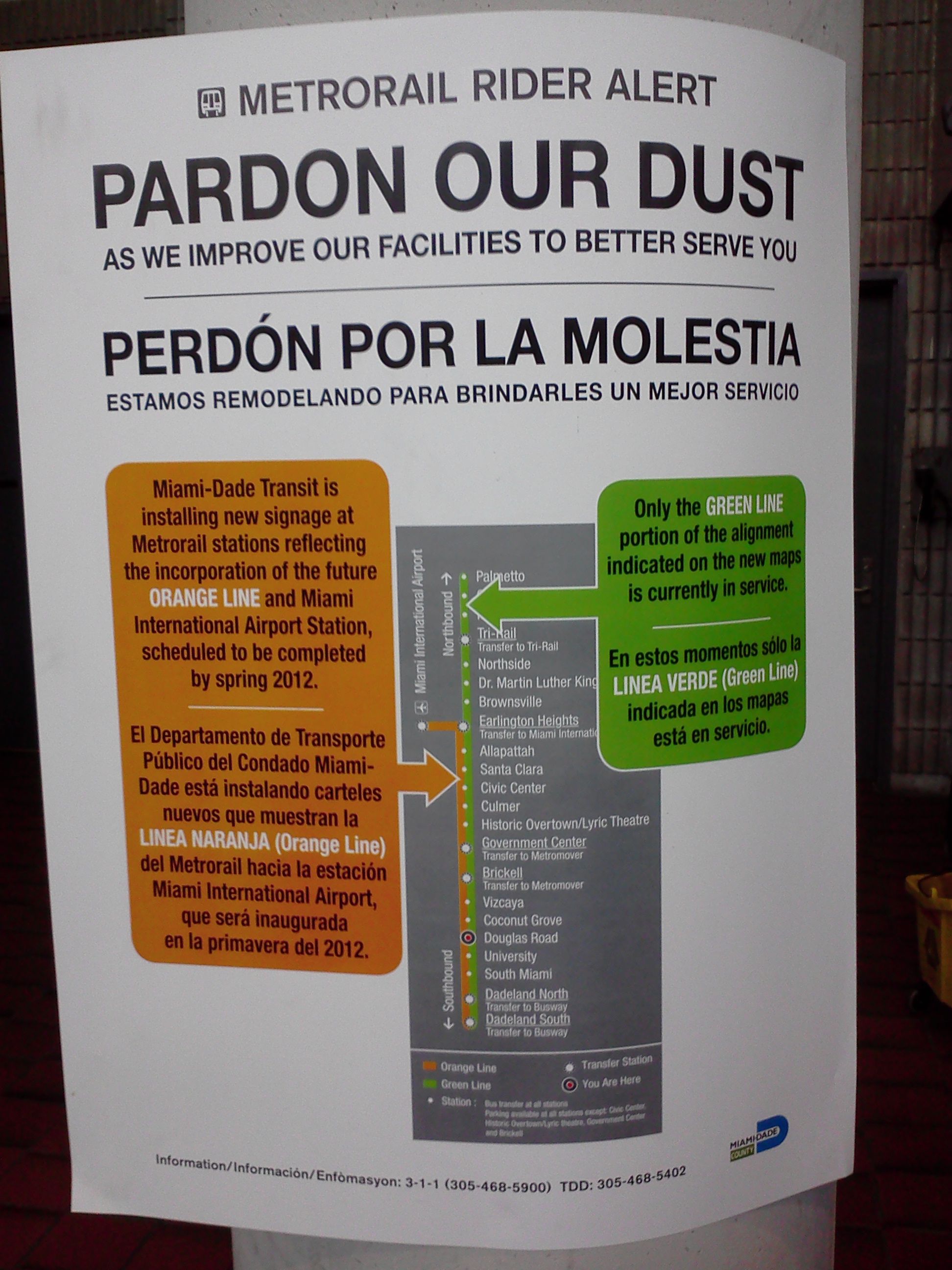
First settled by the Spanish in the 16th century, 19% of Floridians now speak Spanish, which is the most widely taught second language. In Miami, 67% of residents spoke Spanish as their first language in 2000.

In addition, there are several other major cities in Florida with a sizable percentage of the population able to speak Spanish, most notably Tampa (18%) and Orlando (16.6%). Ybor City, a historic neighborhood near downtown Tampa, was founded and is populated chiefly by Spanish and Cuban immigrants. Most Spanish-speakers in Florida are of Cuban descent and live in metropolitan Miami, followed by those of Puerto Rican origin in Miami and Orlando, and Mexican origin in Tampa, Fort Myers and Naples.

=== New Mexico ===
New Mexico is commonly thought to have Spanish as an official language alongside English because of its wide usage and legal promotion of Spanish in the state; however, the state has no official language. New Mexico's laws are promulgated in both Spanish and English. English is the state government's paper working language, but government business is often conducted in Spanish, particularly at the local level. Spanish has been spoken in New Mexico since the 16th century. Spanish was formerly an official language of New Mexico until 1953 at latest.

Because of its relative isolation from other Spanish-speaking areas over most of its 400-year existence, New Mexico Spanish, particularly the Spanish of northern New Mexico and Colorado has retained many elements of 16th- and 17th-century Spanish lost in other varieties and has developed its own vocabulary. In addition, it contains many words from Nahuatl, the language that is still spoken by the Nahua people in Mexico. New Mexican Spanish also contains loanwords from the Pueblo languages of the upper Rio Grande Valley, Mexican-Spanish words (mexicanismos), and borrowings from English. Grammatical changes include the loss of the second-person plural verb form, changes in verb endings, particularly in the preterite, and the partial merger of the second and third conjugations.

=== Texas ===
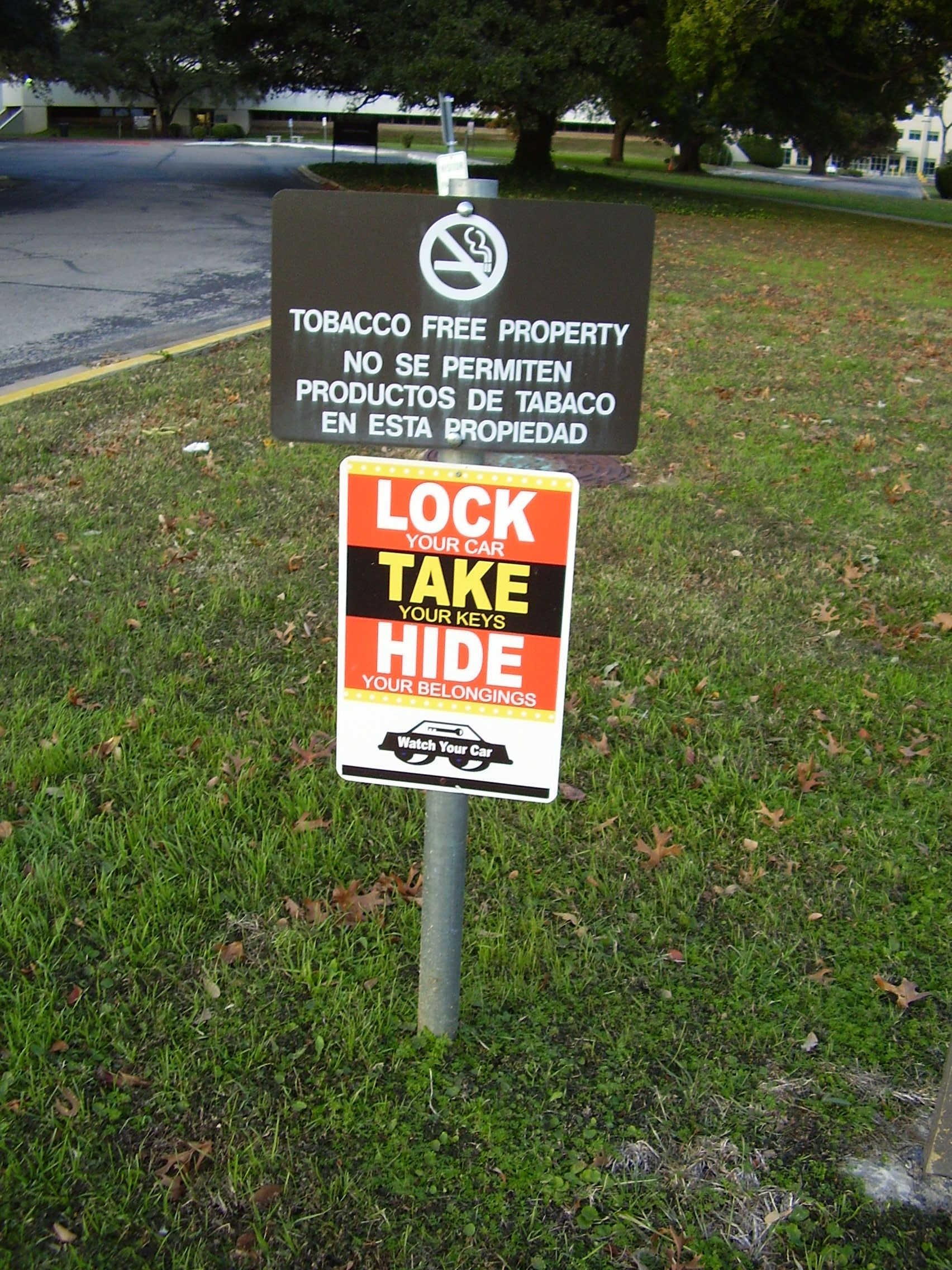
"No Smoking" sign in Spanish and English at the headquarters of the Texas Department of Health in Austin, Texas

In Texas, English is the state's de facto official language and is used in government, although it lacks de jure status. However, the longstanding presence of Spanish Speaking Texans (see: Tejanos and Mexican Americans), in addition to the ebb and flow of Spanish-speaking people across the border since the Texas Revolution, has resulted in large significance of Spanish as a minority language in Texas. Texas's counties close to the Mexican border have large numbers of people of Mexican descent, and so Spanish is commonly spoken in the region. The Texas government, in Section 2054.116 of the Government Code, mandates providing by state agencies of information on their websites in Spanish to assist residents who have limited English proficiency.

=== Kansas ===
Spanish has been spoken in the state of Kansas since at least the early 1900s, primarily because of several waves of immigration from Mexico. That began with refugees fleeing the Mexican Revolution (c. 1910–1920). There are now several towns in Kansas with significant Spanish-speaking populations: Liberal, Garden City, and Dodge City all have populations over 40%. Recently, linguists working with the Kansas Speaks Project have shown how high numbers of Spanish-speaking residents have influenced the dialect of English spoken in areas like Liberal and in other parts of southwest Kansas.

There are many Spanish-language radio stations throughout Kansas, like KYYS in the Kansas City area as well as various Spanish-language newspapers and television stations throughout the state. Several towns in Kansas boast Spanish-English dual language immersion schools in which students are instructed in both languages for varying amounts of time. Examples include Horace Mann Elementary in Wichita, named after the famous educational reformer, and Buffalo Jones Elementary in Garden City, named after Charles "Buffalo" Jones, a frontiersman, bison preservationist, and cofounder of Garden City.

=== Puerto Rico ===
The Commonwealth of Puerto Rico recognizes Spanish and English as official languages, but Spanish is the dominant language and was proclaimed the first official language in 1978. The island was under Spanish control for 400 years; its settlers were mainly Spanish speakers before Spain ceded Puerto Rico to the United States in 1898 following the Spanish–American War.

== Place names ==
Because much of the US was once under Spanish, and later Mexican sovereignty, many places have Spanish names dating to these times. These include the names of several states and major cities. Some of these names preserve older features of Spanish orthography, such as San Ysidro, which would be Isidro in modern Spanish. Later, many other names were created in the American period by non-Spanish speakers, often violating Spanish syntax. This includes names such as Sierra Vista.

== Learning trends ==
In 1917, the American Association of Teachers of Spanish and Portuguese was founded, and the academic study of Spanish literature was helped by negative attitudes towards German due to World War I.

Spanish is currently the most widely taught language after English in American secondary schools and higher education. More than 790,000 university students were enrolled in Spanish courses in the autumn of 2013, with Spanish the most widely taught foreign language in American colleges and universities. Some 50.6% of the over 1.5 million U.S. students enrolled in foreign-language courses took Spanish, followed by French (12.7%), American Sign Language (7%), German (5.5%), Italian (4.6%), Japanese (4.3%), Chinese (3.9%), Arabic (2.1%), and Latin (1.7%). These totals remain relatively small in relation to the total U.S. population.

== Radio and media ==

As of 2012, Univisión was the fourth-largest network overall in the United States and also the country's largest Spanish-language network, followed by Telemundo.

Spanish-language radio is the largest non-English broadcasting media. While foreign language broadcasting declined steadily, Spanish broadcasting grew steadily from the 1920s to the 1970s.

The 1930s were boom years. The early success depended on the concentrated geographical audience in Texas and the Southwest. American stations were close to Mexico, which enabled a steady circular flow of entertainers, executives and technicians and stimulated the creative initiatives of Spanish-speaking radio executives, brokers, and advertisers. Ownership was increasingly concentrated in the 1960s and 1970s. The industry sponsored the now-defunct trade publication Sponsor from the late 1940s to 1968. Spanish-language radio has influenced the national discourse on key current affairs issues such as citizenship and immigration.

There are 500 Spanish newspapers, 152 magazines, and 205 publishers in the United States. El Nuevo Herald (Miami) and La Opinión (Los Angeles) are among the highest circulating American Spanish-language newspapers.

== Language variation ==
There is a great diversity of accents of Spanish in the United States. The influence of English on US Spanish is very important. In many Latino (also called Hispanic) youth subcultures, it is common to mix Spanish and English to produce Spanglish, a term for code-switching between English and Spanish, or for Spanish with heavy English influence.

The Academia Norteamericana de la Lengua Española (North American Academy of the Spanish Language) tracks the developments of the Spanish spoken in the United States and the influences of English.

=== Varieties ===
Linguists distinguish the following varieties of the Spanish spoken in the United States:

- Mexican Spanish: the US–Mexico border, throughout the Southwest from California to Texas, as well as in Chicago, but becoming ubiquitous throughout the Continental United States. Standard Mexican Spanish is often used and taught as the standard dialect of Spanish in the Continental United States.
- Caribbean Spanish: Spanish as spoken by Puerto Ricans, Cubans, and Dominicans. It is largely heard throughout the Northeast and Florida, especially New York City and Miami, and in other cities in the East.
- Central American Spanish: Spanish as spoken by people with origins in Central American countries such as El Salvador, Guatemala, Honduras, Nicaragua, Costa Rica, and Panama. It is largely heard in major cities throughout California and Texas, as well as Washington, DC; New York; and Miami.
- Spanish language in South America: Spanish as spoken by people with origins in South American countries such as Venezuela, Colombia, Peru, Ecuador, Chile, and Bolivia. It is largely heard in major cities throughout New York State, California, Texas, and Florida.
- Colonial Spanish: Spanish as spoken by descendants of Spanish colonists and early Mexicans before the United States expanded and annexed the Southwest and other areas.
  - Californian Spanish (1769–present): California, especially the Central Coast
  - Isleño Spanish (1783–present): St. Bernard Parish, Louisiana
  - Sabine River Spanish: Parts of Sabine and Natchitoches Parishes, Louisiana, and the Moral community west of Nacogdoches. Moribund, originated from rural Mexican Spanish.
  - New Mexican Spanish: Central and north-central New Mexico and south-central Colorado and the border regions of Arizona, Texas, and New Mexico, and southeastern Colorado

Many Spanish speakers in the US speak it as a heritage language. Many of these heritage speakers are semi-speakers, or transitional bilinguals, which means they spoke Spanish in early childhood but largely switched to an English-speaking environment. They typically have a strong passive command of the language, but never fully acquired it. Other, fluent heritage speakers have not undergone such a total shift from Spanish to English in their immediate family.

Transitional bilinguals often produce errors which are rarely found among native Spanish speakers but which are common among second-language learners. Transitional bilinguals often face difficulties in Spanish classrooms since teaching materials designed for English monolinguals and those designed for fluent heritage speakers are both inadequate.

Heritage speakers in general have a native or near-native phonology.

=== Dialect contact ===
Spanish in the US shows mixing and dialect leveling between different varieties of Spanish in large cities with Hispanophones of different origins. For example, Salvadorans in Houston show a shift towards lowered rates of /s/ reduction, due to contact with the larger number of Mexican speakers and the low prestige of Salvadoran Spanish.

Los Angeles has its own vernacular Spanish variety, the result of dialect leveling between speakers of different, mainly central Mexican varieties. The children of Salvadoran parents who grow up in Los Angeles typically grow up speaking this variety. Other cities may have their own vernacular Spanish varieties as well.

Voseo, the use of the second person pronoun vos instead of or alongside the more widespread tú, is widespread among Honduran and Salvadoran immigrants to the US. The children of these immigrants tend to accommodate to more widespread use of tú, although at the same time they maintain occasional use of vos as a symbol of Central American identity. Second-generation Salvadoran-Americans often engage in verbal voseo, using voseo-related verb forms alongside tú due to linguistic insecurity in contact situations. On the other hand, third-generation Salvadoran-Americans have begun using pronominal voseo, with vos being used alongside the verb forms associated with tú.

== Phonology ==
Spanish in the US often has some phonological influence from English. For example, bilinguals who grew up in the Mesilla Valley in southern New Mexico most often merge the two rhotic consonants /r/ and /ɾ/ as [ɾ]. The use of a trill is even less frequent in northern New Mexico, where contact with monolingual Mexican Spanish is lesser.

[v] has been reported as an allophone of /b/ in Chicano Spanish in the Southwest, both when spelled ⟨b⟩ and when spelled ⟨v⟩. This is primarily due to English influence. Although Mexican Spanish generally pronounces /x/ as a velar fricative, Chicano Spanish often realizes it as a glottal [h], like English's h sound. In addition, /d/ may occasionally be realized as a fricative in initial position.

The vowel system of Spanish speakers in the US may also be affected by English influence. For example, /u/ can be fronted.

Much of the variation in US Spanish pronunciation reflects the differences between other Spanish dialects and varieties:

- As in most of Hispanic America, ⟨z⟩ and ⟨c⟩ (before /e/ and /i/) are pronounced as [s], the same way as ⟨s⟩. Note that seseo (the act of not distinguishing /s/ from /θ/) is not only typical of the speech of Latino Americans but is also typical among Hispanic Americans of Andalusian and Canarian descent.
- Spanish in the Americas usually features yeísmo, with no distinction being made between ⟨ll⟩ and ⟨y⟩ as both are pronounced [ʝ]. Yeísmo is an expanding and now dominant feature of Peninsular Spanish as well, particularly in urban speech (Madrid, Toledo) and in Andalusia and the Canary Islands, but [ʎ] is still preserved in some rural areas of northern Spain. Speakers of Rioplatense Spanish pronounce both ⟨ll⟩ and ⟨y⟩ as [ʒ] or [ʃ]. The traditional pronunciation of the digraph ⟨ll⟩, [ʎ], is preserved in some dialects along the Andes range, especially in inland Peru and the highlands of Colombia highlands, northern Argentina, and all of Bolivia and Paraguay.
- Most speakers with ancestors born in the coastal regions may debuccalize or aspirate syllable-final /s/ to [h] or entirely drop; this, está [esˈta] ("s/he is") sounds like [ehˈta] or [eˈta], as in southern Spain (Andalusia, Murcia, Castile–La Mancha (except the northeastern part), Canary Islands, Ceuta, and Melilla).
- In many Caribbean dialects, the phonemes /l/ and /r/ can be exchanged or sound alike at the end of a syllable: caldo > ca[r]do, cardo > ca[l]do. At the end of words, /r/ becomes silent, which gives Caribbean Spanish a partial non-rhoticity. That occurs left often happens as well in Ecuador and Chile and is a feature brought from Extremadura and westernmost Andalusia, in Spain.
- In Puerto Rico, besides [ɾ], [r], and [l], syllable-final /r/ can be realized as [ɹ], an influence of American English: "verso"' (verse) can become [ˈbeɹso], besides [ˈbeɾso], [ˈberso], or [ˈbelso]; "invierno" (winter) can become [imˈbjeɹno], aside from [imˈbjeɾno], [imˈbjerno], or [imˈbjelno]; and "escarlata" (scarlet) can become [ehkaɹˈlata], aside from [ehkaɾˈlata], [ehkarˈlata], or [ehkaˈlata]. Word-finally, /r/ is usually one of the following:
1. a trill, a tap, an approximant, [l], or silent before a consonant or a pause, as in amo[r ~ ɾ ~ ɹ ~ l ~ ∅] paterno ('paternal love');
2. a tap, an approximant, or [l] before a vowel-initial word, as in amo[ɾ ~ ɹ ~ l] eterno ('eternal love').
- Word-finally, /n/ is frequently velar [ŋ] in American Spanish and pan (bread) is often pronounced ['paŋ]. To an English-speaker, the [ŋ] makes pan sound like pang. Velarization of word-final /n/ is widespread in the Caribbean and in Central America. When in the United States, speakers who would typically produce a velar /n/ frequently accommodate their speech, turning it into an alveolar nasal [n] due to dialect contact and accommodation.

== Vocabulary and grammar ==
The vocabulary and grammar of US Spanish reflect English influence, accelerated change, and the Hispanic American roots of most US Spanish. One example of English influence is that the usage of Spanish words by American bilinguals shows a convergence of semantics between English and Spanish cognates. For example, the Spanish words atender ("to pay attention to") and éxito ("success") have acquired a similar semantic range in US Spanish to the English words "attend" and "exit." In some cases, loanwords from English turn existing Spanish words into homonyms: coche has come to acquire the additional meaning of "coach" in the United States, it retains its older meaning of "car." Other phenomena include:

- Loan translations such as correr para 'to run for', aplicar para 'to apply for', and soñar de instead of soñar con 'to dream of' frequently occur.
- Expressions with patrás, such as llamar patrás, are widespread. Though these appear to be calques, they likely represent a semantic extension.
- Spanish speakers in the US tend to use estar more often instead of ser. This is an extension of an ongoing trend within Spanish, since historically estar was used far less often. For more information, see Spanish copulas.
- Spanish speakers in the southwest tend to use the morphological future tense exclusively to express grammatical mood. The periphrastic construction 'ir + a + infinitive' is used for speaking about events that will occur in the future.
- In Chicano Spanish varieties, the word agarrar has acquired a very wide range of meanings, much like the English word "get".
- While varieties of Spanish in the US have traditionally not used the second person singular pronoun vos, this feature has been introduced by Central American immigrants. While the children of these immigrants use voseo much less often than their parents, the pronoun vos remains as a symbol of identity. Verbal voseo is often found among linguistically insecure second-generation Salvadoran-Americans in contact with speakers of other varieties, while pronominal voseo is often found among third-generation Salvadoran-Americans who have adopted the tú-related verb forms but maintain the pronoun vos as a symbol of identity.
- Spanish-speakers who are more proficient in English tend to use the subjunctive mood less often. This same preference for the indicative also correlates independently with lower education in Spanish, reflecting variation in monolingual Spanish.
- Disappearance of de (of) in certain expressions, as is the case with Canarian Spanish: esposo Rosa for esposo de Rosa, gofio millo for gofio de millo, etc.

== Literature ==
American literature in Spanish dates back to 1610 when a Spanish explorer Gaspar Pérez de Villagrá first published his epic poem History of New Mexico. However, it was not until the late 20th century that Spanish, Spanglish, and bilingual poetry, plays, novels, and essays were readily available on the market through independent, trade, and commercial publishing houses and theaters. Cultural theorist Christopher González identifies authors—such as Oscar “Zeta” Acosta, Gloria Anzaldúa, Piri Thomas, Gilbert Hernandez, Sandra Cisneros, and Junot Díaz—as having written innovative works that created new audiences for Spanish literature in the United States.

== See also ==
- List of most commonly learned foreign languages in the United States
- List of U.S. cities with diacritics
- List of U.S. communities with Hispanic majority populations
- List of Spanish-language newspapers published in the United States

General:

- Bilingual education
- Spanglish
- Spanish language in the Americas
- Spanish language in science and technology
- List of colloquial expressions in Honduras
- Spanish language in the Philippines
- History of the Spanish language
- Languages in the United States
- Hispanic

== Bibliography ==
- Abernathy, Francis (1976). "The Spanish on the Moral". The Bicentennial Commemorative History of Nacogdoches. Nacogdoches: Nacogdoches Jaycees. pp. 21–33.
- Cobos, Rubén (2003). A Dictionary of New Mexico & Southern Colorado Spanish (2nd ed.). Museum of New Mexico Press. ISBN 0-89013-452-9.
- Lipski, John M. (1987). "El dialecto español de Río Sabinas: vestigios del español mexicano en Luisiana y Texas". Nueva Revista de Filología Hispánica (in Spanish). 35 (1): 111–128. doi:10.24201/nrfh.v35i1.624. JSTOR 40298730.
- Lipski, John M. (2008). Varieties of Spanish in the United States. Washington, D.C.: Georgetown University Press. ISBN 9781589012134.
- Melgarejo, Victoria; Bucholtz, Mary (2020). "Oh, I don't even know how to say this in Spanish" (PDF). Spanish in Context. 17 (3): 488–510. doi:10.1075/sic.18028.buc. ISSN 1571-0718. S2CID 225015729.
- Vigil, Donny (2008). The traditional Spanish of Taos, New Mexico: Acoustic, phonetic and phonological analyses (PhD). Purdue University.
- Waltermire, Mark; Valtierrez, Mayra (2017). "The trill isn't gone: Rhotic variation in southern New Mexican Spanish". Journal of the Linguistic Association of the Southwest. 32 (2): 133–161.
