= List of Spanish words of Nahuatl origin =

Documented Nahuatl words in the Spanish language (mostly as spoken in Mexico and Mesoamerica), also called Nahuatlismos include an extensive list of words that represent (i) animals, (ii) plants, fruit and vegetables, (iii) foods and beverages, and (iv) domestic appliances.

Many of these words end with the absolutive suffix "-tl" in Nahuatl. This word ending—thought to be difficult for Spanish speakers to pronounce at the time—evolved in Spanish into a "-te" ending (e.g. axolotl = ajolote). As a rule of thumb, a Spanish word for an animal, plant, food or home appliance widely used in Mexico and ending in "-te" is highly likely to have a Nahuatl origin.

== Animals ==
1. Acocil (crayfish)
2. Ajolote (axolotl)
3. Cacomixtle
4. Chapulín (grasshopper)
5. Cenzontle (mockingbird)
6. Coyote
7. Escamoles (ant eggs)
8. Guachinango (red snapper)
9. Guajolote (turkey)
10. Ocelote (ocelot)
11. Mapache (raccoon)
12. Mayate (beetle)
13. Moyote (mosquito)
14. Pinacate
15. Pizote (Coati)
16. Quetzal
17. Tecolote (owl)
18. Tepezcuintle
19. Techalote (squirrel)
20. Tlacuache (opossum)
21. Xoloitzcuintli (Mexican Hairless Dog)
22. Zanate (Grackle)
23. Zopilote (vulture)

== Plants, fruits and vegetables ==
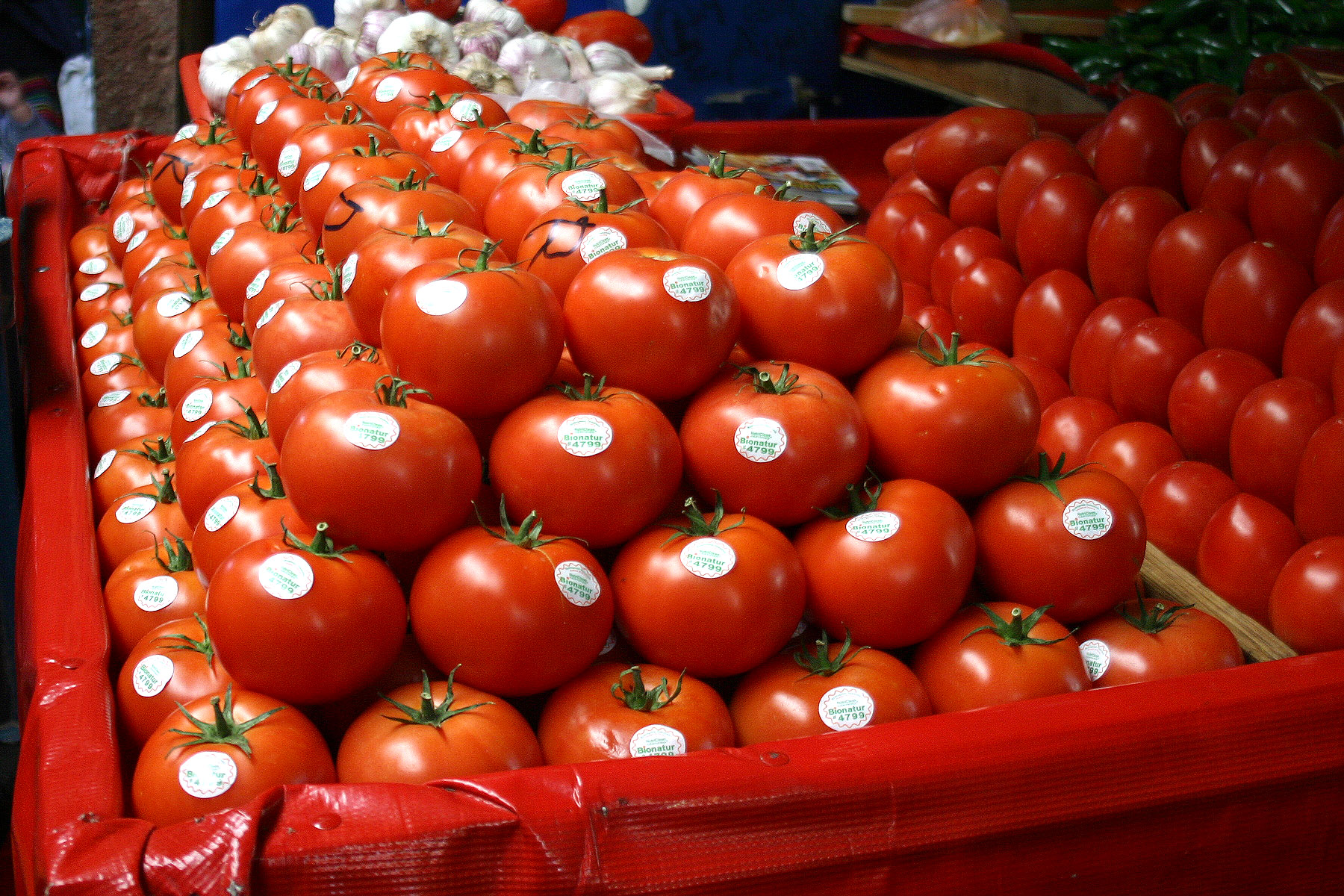
Jitomate at Tepoztlan market, Mexico

- Achiote (Bixa orellana)
- Aguacate (Avocado)
- Ahuehuete (Taxodium mucronatum)
- Amate (a variety of fig)
- Anacahuite (Cordia boissieri)
- Anacua (Ehretia anacua)
- Ayote (squash)
- Cacao
- Camote (sweet potato)
- Cacahuete o cacahuate (peanut)
- Chayote
- Chilacayote
- Chile (chili pepper)
- Ejote (green bean)
- Elote (maize)
- Epazote (Dysphania ambrosioides)
- Huizache (Vachellia farnesiana var. farnesiana)
- Huitlacoche (corn smut)
- Jícama
- Jinamaiste
- Jilote
- Jitomate (tomato)
- Mesquite
- Milpa
- Nejayote
- Nopal (cactus)
- Ochote
- Ocote (Pinus montezumae)
- Olote (cob without the corn)
- Otate (Otatea)
- Peyote
- Quiote (the nectar-filled stem of the agave plant)
- Tepescohuite (Mimosa tenuiflora)
- Tomate (everywhere except Central Mexico – tomato; Central Mexico – tomatillo)
- Tule
- Xalapeño (jalapeño), from its place of origin, the town of Xalapa
- Zihuapaste
- Zacate (grass)
- Zapote (sapodilla)

== Foods and drinks ==
- Atole (a cornmeal drink)
- Chicle (chewing gum)
- Chocolate
- Chipotle (smoked jalapeños)
- Elote (Maize)
- Guacamole
- Huauzontle
- Huitlacoche (corn smut)
- Mezcal
- Mezquitamal
- Mole
- Nanche
- Nixtamal (hominy paste)
- Pinole
- Pozole (hominy)
- Pulque
- Tamal (tamale)
- Tequila
- Tejocote
- Tlacoyo
- Tlayuda
- Xoconostle
- Jocoque

== Placenames ==
Countries

- Cuauhtemallan (Guatemala)
- Mehxico (Mexico)
- Nicanahuac (Nicaragua)
- Cozcatlan (El Salvador)

States of Mexico

- Chiapas
- Chihuahua (state)
- Coahuila
- Colima
- Jalisco
- State of Mexico
- Michoacán
- Oaxaca
- Tabasco (possibly)
- Tlaxcala
- Zacatecas

Departments of Guatemala

- Chimaltenango Department
- Escuintla Department
- Huehuetenango Department
- Jalapa Department
- Jutiapa Department
- Quetzaltenango Department
- Sacatepéquez Department
- Suchitepéquez Department
- Totonicapán Department
- Zacapa Department

Departments of El Salvador

- Ahuachapán Department
- Chalatenango Department
- Cuscatlán Department
- Sonsonate Department
- Usulután Department

Departments of Honduras

- Choluteca Department
- Ocotepeque Department
- Olancho Department
- Yoro Department

Departments of Nicaragua

- Chinandega Department
- Chontales Department
- Jinotega Department
- Masaya Department
- Matagalpa Department

Cities

- Nezahualcoyotl
- Texcoco
- Xochimilco
- Iztacalco
- Iztapalapa
- Tacuba
- Chapultepec
- Tepeyac
- Oaxtepec
- Culiacán
- Mazatlán
- Mexico-Tenochtitlán (former center of the Aztec Empire, now Mexico City)
- Xalapa
- Tegucigalpa
- Managua (possibly)
- Countless other cities throughout Mexico and northern Central America

Mountains and volcanoes

- Acatenango
- Almolonga
- Ajusco
- Cerro Tláloc
- Chinameca (volcano)
- Citlaltépetl
- Izalco (volcano)
- Iztaccíhuatl
- Jocotitlán (volcano)
- Los Atlixcos
- Malinche (volcano)
- Naolinco volcanic field
- Nauhcampatépetl
- Popocatépetl
- San Martin Tuxtla
- Sierra Chichinautzin
- Tliltépetl
- Tolimán (volcano)
- Tzapotépetl
- Usulután (volcano)
- Volcán Atitlán
- Volcán Tajumulco
- Xinantecatl

== Other terms, including home appliances ==
- Ayate
- Azteca (Aztec)
- Cacle (shoe or sandal, from "cactli")
- Capulín
- Chamarra
- Chamaco ("boy", used in Mexican slang, from "chamahuac", meaning "plump")
- Chamagoso
- Chapopote
- Chinampa
- Chiquihuite (hollow basket that holds tortillas)
- Comal (clay cookware)
- Copal
- Cuate (fraternal twin)
- Escuincle (a child)
- Huipil
- Hule (rubber or plastic)
- Itacate
- Jacal (shack)
- Jícara = clay cup / calabash
- Macho = exemplar, one that is worthy of imitation
- Malacate
- Malinche ("traitor", a reference to Doña Marina, or Malintzin)
- Mecapal (tumpline)
- Mecate (rope)
- Metate (grinding stones)
- Mitote (a type of indigenous dance)
- Molcajete (mortar and pestle)
- Nixtamal
- Paliacate
- Papalote (kite)
- Pepenar
- Petaca
- Petate (sleeping mat of woven palm fiber)
- Piciete ("cigarette", used in rural Mexico, from "picietl", literally "tobacco")
- Popote (drinking straw)
- Tapanco (attic, loft)
- Tenamaste
- Tepetate
- Tianguis = open air market
- Tiza
- Tzompantli (skull banner)

== See also ==
- Nahuatl–Spanish contact
- List of English words of Spanish origin
- List of English words of Nahuatl origin
- Influences on the Spanish language
- Indigenous languages of the Americas
