= Sabine River Spanish =

Spanish variety spoken in Texas and Louisiana

- Adaeseño, Adaesano
- Pronunciation: [aðaeˈseɲo], [aðaeˈsano]
- Native to: United States
- Region: Sabine Parish, Louisiana, Natchitoches Parish, Louisiana, Nacogdoches County, Texas
- Native speakers: (< 100 cited 1980s)
- Language family: Indo-European: Italic; Latino-Faliscan; Romance; Italo-Western; Western Romance; Iberian Romance; West Iberian; Castilian; Spanish; Mexican Spanish; Sabine River Spanish
- Early forms: Early Modern Spanish: Rural 18th-century Mexican Spanish

Language codes
- ISO 639-3: –
- Glottolog: adae1234 Adaeseño Spanish
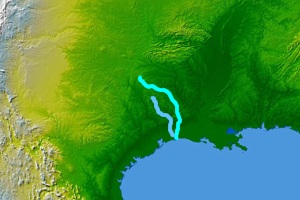
- The Sabine River is marked in lighter blue ■ on the right. The Neches River is marked in darker blue ■ on the left.

Sabine River Spanish is a variety of the Spanish language spoken on both sides of the Sabine River between Texas and Louisiana. It has been spoken by a few communities descended from the 18th-century colonists who established Los Adaes and Nacogdoches. Due to its historical origins, it has a mostly conservative phonology with a vocabulary derived from rural Mexican Spanish. It is facing language death as it has not been passed onto children for several generations.

== Classification ==
Sabine River Spanish was formed from rural Mexican Spanish, in spite of the common belief in Nacogdoches that the Spanish-speaking group around the Sabine River is of Isleño origin. The Sabine River Spanish-speaking communities have no terms to identify themselves as a group. Adaeseño, in reference to Los Adaes, has been used by Armistead and Dr. Comfort Pratt for the dialect spoken on the Louisiana side of the river. Stark (1980) uses "Zwolle-Ebarb Spanish", from the names of two towns in Louisiana where it's spoken. Lipski uses the term Sabine River Spanish because the dialect extends to both sides of the river.

== History ==
The Sabine River Spanish communities were founded as part of a Spanish effort to settle the eastern edge of Texas and adjoining areas of Louisiana in the 1700s. Nacogdoches was founded as part of this settlement and so was Los Adaes.

The Spanish language was preserved in the Sabine River communities until the 20th century due to isolation and, in Texas at least, ethnic solidarity. The Louisiana communities had less ethnic solidarity but greater social isolation due to their distance from population centers, poverty, racial differences from the surrounding population, and the fact they spoke a "foreign" language. The establishment of public schooling exerted strong linguistic pressure on these communities to learn and exclusively speak English, and the arrival of modern infrastructure such as electricity, paved roads, telephones, and the Kansas City Southern Railway through Zwolle reduced their isolation. This stopped the intergenerational transmission of Spanish, with most Spanish-speaking residents choosing not to teach their children the language. In this way the Spanish language has largely died out in a single generation along the Sabine River.

This dialect is currently moribund. As of the 1980s, there were no more than 50 individuals with significant active competence in Spanish on either side of the river. Stark (1980) estimated the presence of just ten people who still speak Spanish fluently in the Zwolle-Ebarb area, who were mainly in their seventies and eighties.

== Geographic distribution ==
The Sabine River area's Spanish dialect is found on either side of the Toledo Bend Reservoir along the Sabine River. Most of the Spanish speakers in the Louisiana side were found around Zwolle, Ebarb and Noble, and in the Spanish Lake community near Robeline. In Texas they are concentrated in the Moral community west of Nacogdoches.

The Louisiana and Texas communities differ in terms of ethnic identification. Louisiana residents have diverse appearances, some being very pale and others vary dark-complexioned, and have experienced a re-surfacing of American Indian identity. As a result, they may identify ethnically as either Spanish, Indo-Spanish, or simply American Indian. The Louisiana residents have been called "Meskin", "Chonche", and "Red Bones" by their Anglo-American neighbors. Louisiana residents reject any identification as "Mexican", while Moral residents freely use the term mexicano and even occasionally call their dialect mexicano. In Moral there is no identification with Native American culture, despite the open acknowledgement of many trigueño, or 'dark-complexioned' residents.

=== Dialects ===
Different studies and surveys have focused on different Spanish-speaking communities in the area. Stark (1980) focuses on the variety spoken in Zwolle and Ebarb; four of her five informants have lived most of their lives in Ebarb, with one later moving to Zwolle, while one lived most of his life near Zwolle. Pratt focused on all the Louisiana dialects, calling them Adaeseño.

In terms of differences between the different varieties, Pratt (2000) finds that the Adaeseño varieties in Louisiana are generally homogenous. Lipski (2008) says that the Moral dialect "may reflect some aspects of Mexican Spanish from the first decades of the nineteenth centuries" while the Louisiana dialects are derived from eighteenth-century Mexican Spanish. This would be because Nacogdoches experienced a period of growth between 1821 and 1836. The current Moral dialect has more speakers and is also more heavily influenced by modern Mexican Spanish, due to a higher frequency of contact with Mexican Spanish speakers.

Gregory (1996) mentions a greater number of French loanwords in the speech of the communities closer to Natchitoches.

== Phonology ==
Sabine River Spanish, being derived from northern Mexican Spanish, is rather phonologically conservative, generally retaining consonants and avoiding neutralizations. English influence is noted as well, and there are various phonological misidentifications, analogical forms and sporadic variations. Sabine River Spanish is, like most Spanish dialects, yeísta, and like other Spanish dialects in the Americas, seseante.

=== Fricatives ===
/s/ is occasionally aspirated or elided, with elision being more common than aspiration, though it is conserved most often. /s/ may even be aspirated or elided when between vowels. /s/ may also become voiced, like /z/, between vowels or at the end of a phrase. Before consonants, /s/ is often elided, and at the end of a phrase it's typically conserved. Nojotros or lojotros are common variants of nosotros 'we'. Stark (1980) reports that /s/ before /k/ and after a vowel is realized as [ʃ] in formal speech. Otherwise, /s/ is realized as [s].

The phoneme /f/ becomes a weak [h] before /w/, so afuera 'outside' is pronounced [aˈhwera]. Otherwise, /f/ is a voiceless labiodental fricative [f]. /x/ is typically pronounced [h] as well. One speaker, again the oldest and most fluent in Spanish from Pratt (2000)'s survey, pronounced trajeron 'they brought' as [tɾuˈʃweɾon]. This allophone doesn't appear elsewhere in her survey.

=== Nasals ===
This variety does not velarize final -/n/, though /n/ may occasionally be elided between vowels or at the end of a phrase. When it's elided, the preceding vowel is nasalized.

The voiced palatal nasal, represented by ⟨ñ⟩, is typically pronounced as a nasal palatal approximant [j̃] which nasalizes the preceding vowel in informal speech, e.g.: año [ãj̃o] 'year', though Pratt (2000) failed to find this approximant pronunciation in the speech of her oldest, most fluent informant. A similar pronunciation is found in Brazilian and Angolan Portuguese.

/m/ shows no irregularity.

=== Voiceless stops ===
/t/ is occasionally alveolar, unlike the typical voiceless denti-alveolar plosive of Spanish, and may even be flapped. That is a result of contact with English. Unstressed vowels are often reduced to a schwa. The other voiceless stops, /p/ and /k/, show little to no deviation from standard Spanish norms, nor does the affricate /tʃ/, spelled ⟨ch⟩.

=== Liquids ===
The lateral consonant /l/ is occasionally elided before other consonants. In phrase-final and word-final position, elision of -/ɾ/ is relatively frequent, especially in verb infinitives. Word-final -/ɾ/ occasionally becomes /l/ before a word starting in a vowel.

Lipski reports that the opposition between the alveolar trill /r/ and the alveolar tap /ɾ/ has been largely neutralized and that the extension of this neutralization points to an earlier origin. On the other hand, this neutralization isn't found in Stark (1980)'s notes. In Pratt (2000), the neutralization isn't found in the speech of the oldest, most fluent informant. Pratt (2000) also finds that the trilled /r/ may occasionally be elided.

In informal speech, /r/ can be elided before a denti-alveolar stop /t/ or /d/, or before a pause, thus: cardenal [kaðeˈnal] 'cardinal (bird)', carta [ˈkarta] 'letter', salir [saˈli] 'to leave'.

=== Voiced obstruents ===
The voiced obstruents /b/, /d/, /g/ show some deviation from standard pronunciation. /b/ may be pronounced as a fricative even at the beginning of a phrase or after a nasal. The labiodental fricative allophone [v], according to Pratt (2000), typically corresponds to a written, etymological ⟨v⟩, but it can be realized when pronouncing other words as well. /b/ is often elided when it's before another consonant, as in obtuvo [oˈtuvo] 'obtained'. It's also frequently elided in también 'also', typically pronounced [taˈmjen]. /b/ is occasionally pronounced as a velar fricative [ɣ] when before [o] or [u].

/d/ is rarely realized as a voiced dental stop [d], even after a pause or a nasal. In general, it's realized as a voiced dental fricative [ð]. Intervocalically, in an unstressed syllable, it may be elided, as in many other Spanish varieties, i.e.: dedo [ˈdeo]. /d/ is frequently elided at the beginning of words, and donde 'where' is typically pronounced [ˈon.ne]. It may also be realized as an alveolar tap [ɾ] between vowels, though this is only found among the last generation of Spanish speakers. In the sequence /ɾd/, either the /d/ or the /ɾ/ is often elided, thus guardan 'they save' is typically pronounced either [ˈgwaɾan] or [ˈgwaðan]. In the sequence /dɾ/, the /d/ sometimes becomes an [i], thus padre 'father' and madre 'mother' are pronounced paire and maire respectively.

/g/ is realized as a voiced velar stop after a pause and in any consonant cluster, for example in Goyo [ˈɡoʝo] 'Gregorio', algodón [algoˈðon] 'cotton', negrito [neˈgrito] 'black haw tree'. Otherwise, intervocalically, it's a voiced velar fricative [ɣ], and it may also be realized as a fricative after a nasal, as in tengo [ˈteŋɣo] 'I have'. /g/ is occasionally elided when between vowels, including after nasal vowels, as in tengo [ˈtẽo]. /gw/ typically becomes /w/, thus guajolote [wahoˈlote] 'turkey'.

The approximant /ʝ/, spelled ⟨y⟩ or ⟨ll⟩ is frequently elided in contact with /i/ and after /e/, for example gallina 'hen' becomes [gaˈina], silla 'chair' becomes [ˈsi.a] and sello 'stamp' becomes [ˈse.o]. One speaker, the oldest and most fluent in Spanish in Pratt (2000)'s survey, often adds an epenthetic [ʝ] between sequences of /i/ and /o/ or /i/ and /a/, as in tío [ˈti.ʝo] 'uncle'. One speaker dropped [j] in the diphthong /ie/ after another consonant while speaking informally, saying [ˈrendas] for riendas 'reins' and [ˈtera] for tierra 'land'. He also dropped /ʝ/ after /i/ or /e/, thus saying [voˈtea] for botella 'bottle'.

=== Vowels ===
The vowel system in Zwolle-Ebarb contains the same 5 vowels as other Spanish varieties. Vowels are nasalized when they're between nasal consonants or before [j̃]. Additionally, /e/ and /o/ are typically mid vowels, [e̞] and [o̞], but they can be lightly raised after palatal sounds. /e/ is often raised in many words, but it is not raised in word-final position, as is common in some other dialects. Unstressed vowels, especially /a/, are often reduced to a schwa. /o/ often becomes /u/, especially at the ends of words, and including in the conjunction o 'or'. Hiatus between vowels tends to be avoided, either by the formation of diphthongs or by the deletion of some of the vowels involved. Also, the clusters /uar/ and /uer/ are frequently interchanged.

Stark (1980) found that /a/ becomes nasalized before /o/, such as in the -ado ending where the /d/ has been elided.

=== Clusters ===
There is a tendency to simplify clusters and to drop consonants before voiceless stops in some words, as in doctor 'doctor', molcajete 'molcajete, and fuiste 'you went/were', pronounced dotor, mocajete, and fuite respectively. Additionally, word initial /e/ or /o/ can be dropped in sequences like /esC/ or /osC/, where C is a voiceless stop. Thus escuela 'school' is pronounced [ˈskwela], and oscuro 'dark' is [ˈskuɾo]. Sometimes the entire first syllable of such words can be dropped, as in tar or cuela for estar, escuela 'to be, school'.

Stark (1980) reports that the word-initial nasal is dropped in words starting with /njV/, so nieto 'grandchild' is realized [ˈjeto], although this was not found in Pratt (2000).

== Grammar ==
The grammar of Sabine River Spanish reflects its origins in nonstandard, rural Mexican speech, as well as influence from English and morphological reduction due to language death. Archaic forms such as trujo/truje for trajo/traje 'brought', vido/vide for vio/vi 'saw', mesmo for mismo 'same', muncho for mucho 'a lot', and asina/ansina for así 'like this/that' are widespread. Many verb forms formed as a result of morphological leveling such as cierraron for cerraron 'they closed', dijieron for dijeron 'they said', cocinear for cocinar 'to cook', and tenimos for tuvimos 'we had' are common.

Mexicanisms such as mero instead of mismo, like in Mexican Spanish, is common, also there's the expression ya mero for "almost". De nosotros 'of us' has almost completely replaced nuestro 'ours', as in some forms of Mexican and Caribbean Spanish. Nomás is frequently used instead of sólo or solamente, like in Mexican Spanish. Estar is very frequently used in place of ser. Que tanto and que tan are frequently used instead of cuanto or cuan.

Dr. Comfort Pratt has found that Adaeseño, despite its mostly Mexican providence, uses vosotros as a second-person plural pronoun, with the corresponding verb forms, as in vosotros tenéis 'you (pl.) have'. However, when tú is used alongside another subject, the corresponding verb form is that of ustedes, the third-person plural. Thus, tú y tu hermana tienen 'you and your sister have'. Voseo is nonexistent in Sabine River Spanish.

P'atrás expressions are widespread, as in other Spanish varieties in contact with English. As a result of language death and its speakers' greater fluency in English, gender and number agreement are greatly weakened. In addition, use of the subjunctive mood, the simple, or synthetic future tense, and the conditional tense is greatly reduced. The remaining speakers of Adaeseño generally prefer analytic constructions.

== Vocabulary ==
Many Mexicanisms, including a large number of Nahuatl loanwords, and generally archaic or rustic words are used in Sabine River Spanish. The majority of Nahuatl loans have to do with plants, animals, or elements of material culture. Almost all Nahuatl loans are nouns. Sabine River Spanish has taken in very few English loanwords. French loans are common in the communities closer to Natchitoches, and they are more common than English words.

Despite an extensive history of contact, Sabine River Spanish almost no loans from native American languages besides Nahuatl. This likely reflects frontier conditions in which Native Americans were marginalized. All words for "Indian" in this variety are at least partially derogatory, for example meco or chichimeco from "Chichimeca", the Nahuatl term for the "wild" tribes on Mexico's northern frontier.

The term Chonche, a local slur for Spanish people, likely comes from the Wichita term for the Lipan Apache, many of whom were sold as slaves to the Spanish and French and were the ancestors of many Sabine River Hispanics, though it may have a Muskogean origin in a term for swallows.

The term arrear, which refers to driving or spurring on animals, became the Zwolle-Ebarb community's term for driving a car.

Some of the Nahuatlisms in Sabine River Spanish include:

List of Nahuatlisms
- mecate 'rope'
- molcajete 'molcajete'
- metate 'metate'
- chancles 'bad shoes'
- molote 'hair bun'
- topanco 'ceiling'
- troje 'corn cob'
- chimonca 'Pine knot'
- guaje 'gourd'
- muelvo 'wagon'
- chichahuiste 'basket'
- comal 'skillet, comal'
- petate 'a mat'
- tamales 'tamales'
- pozole 'sweetened'. In Mexican Spanish, pozole is a type of stew.
- chichi 'mother's milk'
- cuate 'twin'
- cuacha 'baby poop'
- zopilote 'buzzard'
- chilizonte 'mockingbird'
- guajolote 'turkey'
- zumacaya 'owl'
- tecolote 'owl'
- pichicuate 'water mocassin'
- tapalcate 'tadpole'
- ajolote 'mud puppy'
- tacuache 'possum'
- chichote 'ringworm'
- mayate 'black bug'
- ocotesillo 'ticks'
- chapule 'grasshopper'
- huilotes 'butterflies'
- jicote 'wasp'
- cojosote 'sweet gum'
- copal 'sweet gum sap'
- nogal 'hickory/pecan'
- ocote 'pine'
- ampesote 'weeds'
- amolde 'Yucca'
- zacate 'grass'
- nixtamal 'hominy'
- elote 'ear of corn, elote'
- olote 'corn cob'
- chicales 'braided corn'
- cacahuate 'peanut'
- camotes 'sweet potatoes'
- tomates 'tomatoes'
- ejote 'snap beans, peas'
- pastli 'Spanish moss'
- pinole 'parched corn'
- atole 'thin sweet gruel'
- tuza 'mole'

Other Mexicanisms include:

Mexicanisms
- tejón 'raccoon'
- güero 'blond, light-complexioned'
- charola 'tray'
- labor 'a division of land'
- blanquillo 'egg'
- ándale 'Let's go, OK'
- pinche 'damned'
- chingar 'fuck', and its derivatives, now merely vulgar rather than sexual

Generally archaic words in Sabine River Spanish, no longer used in standard speech elsewhere, include:

Archaic/rustic words
- mercar/marcar 'to buy'
- calzón/calzones 'pants'
- túnico 'a woman's dress'
- calesa 'horse-drawn buggy'
- la provisión 'supplies, provisions'
- noria 'water well'
- truja/troja 'barn'
- encino 'oak tree'
- peje 'fish'
- fierro 'iron, tool'
- lumbre 'fire'
- prieto 'black'

Other items include:

Other words
- huaguín 'wagon'
- payaso 'bat', alternates with murcégalo, from the standard murciélago. Payaso typically means 'clown'
- The Caribbean term maní 'peanut', originally from Taíno, which alternates with the more common Nahuatlism cacahuate, and with the English term 'goober' in Louisiana
- ojo negro 'black-eyed pea'
- pan de molino 'corn bread'
- cusca/cushca 'buzzard', of unknown etymology

== Code switching ==
Vestigial speakers of Sabine River Spanish, often with limited active competence in the language, would often engage in code-switching while attempting to speak entirely in Spanish. The rate of switching between languages in a single sentence was very high, and often violated the typical syntactic restrictions on Spanish/English code-switching. The speech of Adaeseños was, to Lipski, "impressionistically unlike anything I have ever heard from fluent Spanish-English bilinguals in any community." Code-switching could occur between subject pronouns and predicates, as in "they hervía las ollas" ("they would boil the pots"), and between negative words and the main verb, as in "si el papá y la mamá no agreed" ("if the father and the mother didn't agree"), or between fronted interrogative words and the rest of the sentence, as in "Nobody knows which way jueron" ("nobody knows which way they went"), to give some examples of code-switches that violate the normal syntactic restraints.

== See also ==
- Isleño Spanish
- Los Adaes
- New Mexican Spanish
- Choctaw-Apache Tribe of Ebarb
- Louisiana (New Spain)
- Adai Caddo Indians of Louisiana

== Bibliography ==
- Abernathy, Francis (1976). "The Spanish on the Moral". The Bicentennial Commemorative History of Nacogdoches. Nacogdoches: Nacogdoches Jaycees. pp. 21–33.
- Gregory, Hiram F. (1996). "Adaesaño: A Nahuatl Lexicon from Natchitoches and Sabine Parishes, Louisiana" (PDF). Southern Studies. VII (I).
- Lipski, John M. (1987). "El dialecto español de Río Sabinas: vestigios del español mexicano en Luisiana y Texas". Nueva Revista de Filología Hispánica (in Spanish). 35 (1): 111–128. doi:10.24201/nrfh.v35i1.624. JSTOR 40298730.
- Lipski, John M. (2008). Varieties of Spanish in the United States. Washington, D.C.: Georgetown University Press. ISBN 9781589012134.
- Neumann-Holzschuh, Ingrid (2007). "Review of El español del noroeste de Luisiana: Pervivencia de un dialecto amenazado". Revista Internacional de Lingüística Iberoamericana. 5 (1 (9)): 262–266. ISSN 1579-9425. JSTOR 41678288.
- Pratt, Comfort (2000). Sabine River Spanish: Survival of a Threatened Dialect (PhD). LSU Historical Dissertations and Theses (in Spanish). Louisiana State University. ISBN 9780599906198. Docket 7292.
- Stark, Louisa R. (1980). "Notes on a Dialect of Spanish Spoken in Northern Louisiana". Anthropological Linguistics. 22 (4): 163–176. ISSN 0003-5483. JSTOR 30027771.
