= Mexican Spanish =

Variety of Spanish language

- Español mexicano
- Pronunciation: [espaˈɲol mexiˈkano]
- Native to: Mexico
- Ethnicity: Mexicans
- Native speakers: L1: 120 million (2021); L2: 8.2 million (2021)
- Language family: Indo-European: Italic; Latino-Faliscan; Romance; Western; Ibero-Romance; West Iberian; Castilian; Spanish; Mexican Spanish
- Dialects: New Mexican; Sabine River dialect Californio Spanish
- Writing system: Latin (Spanish alphabet)

Official status
- Regulated by: Academia Mexicana de la Lengua

Language codes
- ISO 639-1: es
- ISO 639-2: spa
- ISO 639-3: None (mis)
- Glottolog: mexi1248
- IETF: es-MX
- Varieties of Mexican Spanish. Northeastern Northwestern Northern peninsular Western Abajeño Central Southern Coastal Chiapaneco Yucateco

Mexican Spanish (Spanish: español mexicano) is the variety of dialects and sociolects of the Spanish language spoken in Mexico and its bordering regions. Mexico has the world's largest number of Spanish speakers, more than double any other country. Spanish is spoken by over 99% of the population, being the mother tongue of 93.8%, and the second language of 5.4%.

== Variation ==
Mexican Spanish has a great deal of internal variation and is not necessarily coterminous with the country of Mexico. The Spanish spoken in the southernmost state of Chiapas, bordering Guatemala, resembles the variety of Central American Spanish spoken in that country, where voseo is used. Meanwhile, the Treaty of Guadalupe Hidalgo and later immigration led to a large number of Mexicans residing in what had become US territory, and many of their descendants have continued to speak Spanish.

Finally, the Spanish spoken in coastal areas often exhibits certain phonetic traits in common with Caribbean Spanish rather than with that of central Mexico, and the Spanish of the Yucatán Peninsula is quite distinct from other varieties. It should also be noted that there is great variation in intonation patterns from region to region within Mexico. For instance, the Spanish of northern Mexico, including the traditional Spanish of New Mexico, is characterized by its own distinct set of intonation patterns.

Regarding the evolution of the Spanish spoken in Mexico, the Swedish linguist Bertil Malmberg points out that in Central Mexican Spanish—unlike most varieties in the other Spanish-speaking countries—unstressed vowels are often devoiced or elided, while syllable-final consonants, especially /s/, tend not to be reduced. Malmberg attributes this to a Nahuatl substratum. The Mexican linguist Juan M. Lope Blanch, however, finds similar weakening of vowels in regions of several other Spanish-speaking countries; he also finds no similarity between the vowel behavior of Nahuatl and that of Central Mexican Spanish; and thirdly, he finds Nahuatl syllable structure no more complex than that of Spanish. Furthermore, Nahuatl is not alone as a possible influence, as there are currently more than 90 native languages spoken in Mexico and Nahuatl never spread across the entire territory of modern Mexico.

== Phonology ==
=== Consonants ===
Consonant phonemes of Mexican Spanish
	Labial		Dental/Alveolar		Palatal		Velar	
Nasal		m		n		ɲ		
Stop	p	b	t	d	tʃ	ʝ	k	ɡ
Continuant	f	b	s	d	ʃ	ʝ	x	ɡ
Approximant				l		j		w
Flap				ɾ				
Trill				r				

==== Affricates ====
Due to influence from indigenous languages, such as Nahuatl, Mexican Spanish has incorporated many words containing the sequences ⟨tz⟩ and ⟨tl⟩, corresponding to the voiceless alveolar affricate [t͡s] and the voiceless alveolar lateral affricate [t͡ɬ], present in many indigenous languages of Mexico, as in the words tlapalería [t͡ɬapaleˈɾia] ('hardware store') and coatzacoalquense [koat͡sakoalˈkense] ('from [the city of] Coatzacoalcos'). Mexican Spanish always pronounces the /t/ and /l/ in such a sequence in the same syllable, a trait shared with the Spanish of the rest of Latin America, that of the Canary Islands, and the northwest of the Iberian Peninsula, including Bilbao and Galicia. This includes words of Greek and Latin origin with ⟨tl⟩ such as Atlántico and atleta. In contrast, in most of Spain, the /t/ would form part of the previous syllable's coda.

Some claim that in Mexican Spanish, the sequence /tl/ is really a single phoneme, the same as the lateral affricate of Nahuatl. On the other hand, José Ignacio Hualde and Patricio Carrasco argue that /tl/ is best analyzed as an onset cluster on the basis that Mexicans take the same amount of time to pronounce /tl/ as they do to pronounce /pl/ and /kl/. They predicted that if /tl/ were a single segment, it would have been pronounced quicker than the other clusters.

==== Fricatives ====
In addition to the usual voiceless fricatives of other American Spanish dialects (/f/, /s/, /x/), Mexican Spanish also has the palatal sibilant /ʃ/, mostly in words from indigenous languages—especially place names. The /ʃ/, represented orthographically as ⟨x⟩, is commonly found in words of Nahuatl or Mayan origin, such as Xola [ˈʃola] (a station in the Mexico City Metro). The spelling ⟨x⟩ can additionally represent the phoneme /x/ (also mostly in place names), as in México itself (/ˈmexiko/); or /s/, as in the place name Xochimilco—as well as the /ks/ sequence (in words of Greco-Latin origin, such as anexar /anekˈsar/), which is common to all varieties of Spanish. In many Nahuatl words in which ⟨x⟩ originally represented [ʃ], the pronunciation has changed to [x] (or [h])—e.g. Jalapa/Xalapa [xaˈlapa].

Regarding the pronunciation of the phoneme /x/, the articulation in most of Mexico is velar [x], as in caja [ˈkaxa] ('box'). However, in some (but not all) dialects of southern Mexico, the normal articulation is glottal [h] (as it is in most dialects of the Caribbean, the Pacific Coast, the Canary Islands, and most of Andalusia and Extremadura in Spain). Thus, in these dialects, México, Jalapa, and caja are respectively pronounced [ˈmehiko], [haˈlapa], and [ˈkaha].

In northwestern Mexico and rural Michoacan, [tʃ], represented by ⟨ch⟩, tends to be deaffricated to [ʃ], a phonetic feature also typical of southwestern Andalusian Spanish dialects.

All varieties of Mexican Spanish are characterized by yeísmo: the letters ⟨ll⟩ and ⟨y⟩ correspond to the same phoneme, /ʝ/. That phoneme, in most variants of Mexican Spanish, is pronounced as either a palatal fricative [ʝ] or an approximant [ʝ˕] in most cases, although after a pause it is instead realized as an affricate [ɟʝ]. In the north and in rural Michoacan, /ʝ/ is consistently rendered as an approximant and may even be elided when between vowels and in contact with /i/ or /e/, as in gallina 'hen', silla 'chair', and sella 'seal'.

As in all American dialects of Spanish, Mexican Spanish has seseo, so /θ/ is not distinguished from /s/. Thus, casa 'house' and caza 'hunt' are homophones.

Present in most of the interior of Mexico is the preservation, or absence of debuccalization, of syllable-final /s/. On the other hand, /s/-weakening is very frequent on the Pacific and Caribbean coasts, and is also fairly frequent in northern and northwestern Mexico, and in parts of Oaxaca and the Yucatán peninsula. In all these regions, /s/-weakening acts as a sociolinguistic marker, being more prevalent in rural areas and among the lower classes. The prevalence of a weakened syllable-final /s/ in so many peripheral areas of Mexico suggests that such weakening was at one point more prevalent in peripheral areas, but that the influence of Mexico City has led to the diffusion of a style of pronunciation without /s/-weakening, especially among the urban middle classes.

/s/-weakening on both the Pacific and the Gulf Coast was strengthened by influences from Andalusian, Canarian, and Caribbean Spanish dialects.

Also, the dialects spoken in rural Chihuahua, Sonora, and Sinaloa, like that of New Mexico, have developed aspiration of syllable-initial /s/, as in words like pasar 'to pass' and señor 'sir'.

Despite the general lack of s-aspiration in the center of the country, /s/ is often elided before /r/ or /l/, and the phrase buenas noches is often pronounced without the first /s/.

==== Stops ====
There is a set of voiced obstruents—/b/, /d/, /ɡ/, and sometimes /ʝ/—which alternate between approximant and plosive allophones depending on the environment.

/bw/ often becomes /gw/, especially in more rural speech, such that abuelo and bueno may be pronounced as agüelo and güeno. In addition, /gw/ is often assimilated to /w/.

Speakers from the Yucatán, especially men or those who are older, often pronounce the voiceless stops /p, t, k/ with aspiration.

=== Vowels ===
	Front	Central	Back
Close	i		u
Mid	e		o
Open		a	

Like most Spanish dialects and varieties, Mexican Spanish has five vowels: close unrounded front /i/, close rounded back /u/, mid unrounded front /e/, mid rounded back /o/, and open unrounded /a/.

Mexican Spanish, particularly that of central Mexico, features a high rate of reduction, which can involve shortening and centralization, devoicing, or both, and even elision of unstressed vowels, as in [ˈtɾasts] (trastes, 'cooking utensils'). This process is most frequent when a vowel is in contact with the phoneme /s/, so that /s/+ vowel + /s/ is the construction when the vowel is most frequently affected. It can be the case that the words pesos, pesas, and peces are pronounced the same [ˈpe.ses]. The vowels are slightly less frequently reduced or eliminated in the constructions /t, p, k, d/ + vowel + /s/, so that the words pastas, pastes, and pastos may also be pronounced the same [ˈpasts].

== Morphology ==
Mexican Spanish does not use voseo outside some parts of Chiapas. The traditional familiar second person plural pronoun vosotros—in colloquial use only in Spain—is found in Mexico only in certain archaic texts and ceremonial language. However, since it is used in many Spanish-language Bibles throughout the country, most Mexicans are familiar with the form and understand it. An instance of it is found in the national anthem, which all Mexicans learn to sing: Mexicanos, al grito de guerra / el acero aprestad y el bridón ("Mexicans, at the cry of war / assemble the steel and the bridle").

Mexicans tend to use the polite personal pronoun usted in the majority of social situations, especially in Northern Mexico. In the north, children even address their parents with usted.

In rural areas of Sonora, Chihuahua, Durango, Jalisco, Guanajuato, and Tlaxcala, many people use a number of distinct non-standard morphological forms: second person preterite verb forms ending in -ates, ites, instead of -aste, iste; imperfect forms such as traiba, creiba, instead of traía, creía ("brought, believed"); merging -ir and -er verb conjugations, such as using vivemos, instead of vivimos ("we live"); non-standard forms, such as haiga (instead of haya), with non-standard /g/, also used in words such as creigo, instead creo ("I believe"); an accent shift in the first person plural subjunctive forms, such as váyamos, instead of vayamos ("we go"); and a shift from -mos to -nos in proparoxytonic third person singular verb forms, such as cantaríanos, instead of cantaríamos ("we sing"). These same verb forms are also found in the traditional Spanish of northern New Mexico and southern Colorado.

=== Suffixes ===
Central Mexico is noted for the frequent use of diminutive suffixes with many nouns, adverbs, and adjectives, even where no semantic diminution of size or intensity is implied. Most frequent is the -ito/ita suffix, which replaces the final vowel on words that have one. Words ending with -n use the suffix -cito/cita. Use of the diminutive does not necessarily denote small size, but rather often implies an affectionate attitude; thus one may speak of "una casita grande" ("a nice, big house").

When the diminutive suffix is applied to an adjective, often a near-equivalent idea can be expressed in English by "nice and [adjective]". So, for example, a mattress (Spanish: un colchón) described as blandito might be "nice and soft", while calling it blando might be heard to mean "too soft".

In some regions of Mexico, the diminutive suffix -ito is also used to form affectives to express politeness or submission (cafecito, literally "little coffee"; cabecita, literally "little head"; chavito "little boy"), and is attached to names (Marquitos, from Marcos; Juanito, from Juan—cf. Eng. Johnny) denoting affection. In the northern parts of the country, the suffix -ito is often replaced in informal situations by -illo (cafecillo, cabecilla, morrillo, Juanillo).

Frequent use of the diminutive is found across all socioeconomic classes, but its "excessive" use is commonly associated with lower-class speech.

The augmentative suffix -(z)ote is typically used in Mexico to make nouns larger, more powerful, etc. For example, the word camión, in Mexico, means bus; the suffixed form camionzote means "big or long bus". It can be repeated just as in the case of the suffixes -ito and -ísimo; therefore camionzotototote means very, very, very big bus.

The suffix -uco or -ucho and its feminine counterparts -uca and -ucha respectively, are used as a disparaging form of a noun; for example, the word casa, meaning "house", can be modified with that suffix (casucha) to change the word's meaning to make it disparaging, and sometimes offensive; so the word casucha often refers to a shanty, hut or hovel. The word madera ("wood") can take the suffix -uca (maderuca) to mean "rotten, ugly wood".

Other suffixes include, but are not limited to: -azo as in carrazo, which refers to a very impressive car (carro) such as a Ferrari or Mercedes-Benz; -ón, for example narizón, meaning "big-nosed" (nariz = "nose"), or patona, a female with large feet (patas).

=== Nicknames ===
It is common to replace /s/ with /tʃ/ to form diminutives, e.g., Isabel → Chabela; José María → Chema; Cerveza ("beer") → chela or cheve, concepción → conchita, sin muelas ("without molars") → chimuela ("toothless"). This is common in, but not exclusive to, Mexican Spanish.

== Syntax ==
Typical of Mexican Spanish is an ellipsis of the negative particle no in a main clause introduced by an adverbial clause with hasta que:

- Hasta que me tomé la pastilla se me quitó el dolor. (Until I took the pill, the pain did not go away.)

In this kind of construction, the main verb is implicitly understood as being negated.

Mexico shares with many other areas of Spanish America the use of interrogative qué in conjunction with the quantifier tan(to):

- ¿Qué tan graves son los daños? (How serious are the damages?) (Compare the form typical of Spain: "¿Hay muchos daños?" (Is there a lot of damage?))
- ¿Qué tan buen cocinero eres? (How good a cook are you?) (Compare Spain's "¿Eres buen cocinero?" (Are you a good cook?))

It has been suggested that there is influence of indigenous languages on the syntax of Mexican Spanish (as well as that of other areas in the Americas), manifested, for example, in the redundant use of verbal clitics, particularly lo. This is more common among bilinguals or in isolated rural areas.

Mucho muy can be used colloquially in place of the superlative -ísimo, as in:

- Este tipo de tratamientos son mucho muy caros (That type of treatment is really expensive.)

Mexican Spanish, like that of many other parts of the Americas, prefers the preposition por in expressions of time spans, as in

- "Fue presidente de la compañía por veinte años" (He was the president of the company for twenty years)—compare the more frequent use of durante in Spain: "Fue presidente de la compañia durante veinte años."

A more or less recent phenomenon in the speech of central Mexico, having its apparent origin in the State of Mexico, is the use of negation in an unmarked yes/no question. Thus, in place of "¿Quieres...?" (Would you like...?), there is a tendency to ask "¿No quieres...?" (Wouldn't you like...?).

== Lexicon ==
Mexican Spanish retains a number of words that are considered archaic in Spain.

Also, there are a number of words widely used in Mexico which have Nahuatl, Mayan or other native origins, in particular names for flora, fauna and toponyms. Some of these words are used in most, or all, Spanish-speaking countries, like chocolate and aguacate ("avocado"), and some are only used in Mexico. The latter include guajolote "turkey" < Nahuatl huaxōlōtl [waˈʃoːloːt͡ɬ] (although pavo is also used, as in other Spanish-speaking countries); papalote "kite" < Nahuatl pāpālōtl [paːˈpaːloːt͡ɬ] "butterfly"; and jitomate "tomato" < Nahuatl xītomatl [ʃiːˈtomat͡ɬ]. For a more complete list see List of Spanish words of Nahuatl origin.

Other expressions that are common in colloquial Mexican Spanish include:

- ahorita: "soon; in a moment". Literally "right now". E.g. Ahorita que acabe, "As soon as I finish (this)". Considered informal.
- bronca: "fight" or "problem". Literally "aggressive woman or girl, or wild female animal". Commonly used among young people.
- bronco: "wild, untame". E.g. leche bronca: "unpasteurized milk".
- camión: "bus"
- caray: darn.
- carnal: "brother" or "bro"
- chafa: cheap, of bad quality.
- chavo (chava); chamaco (chamaca); chilpayate: "a child, teen, or youngster". Also huerco (huerca), morro (morra), and plebe are used in northern Mexico. All these terms except chilpayate are also found in their diminutives: chavito, chamaquito, huerquito, morrito. Considered informal.
- chequear/checar: "to check (verify)"
- chichi(s): "breast(s)". From Nahuatl chīchīhualli [tʃiːtʃiːwɑlːi]. Considered informal.
- chido: "cool, attractive, fun, etc." A variant common in the Northwest is chilo, sometimes spelled and pronounced shilo.
- chingadera: "trash; crap". Considered vulgar. Derived from chingar.
- cholo: In northern Mexico, equivalent to the English term gangsta; in the rest of Mexico, equivalent to the Spanish term pandillero ("hooligan", "gang member"), which refers to young slum-dwellers living in conditions of extreme poverty, drug dependency, and malnutrition.
- durazno: "peach"
- En un momento: "Just a minute", "Hold on a second", etc. Literally "in a moment".
- escuincle: "a bratty child" or "squirt". From Nahuatl itzcuīntli [it͡skʷiːnt͡ɬi], "dog".
- Este...: a filler word, similar to American English "um, uh". Literally, "this". Also used in other countries.
- equis: The name of the letter X. Coming from the use of X as a variable in math, equis can be a noun modifier meaning "some", it can mean something is unimportant, or it can be an exclamation, used to show indifference towards the truth value of something previously said. It can also express that something is average, or meh.
- gacho: messed-up
- güero: a fair-haired or fair-skinned person. Derived from a term meaning "egg white".
- güey, wey or buey: "dude", "guy" (literally, "ox"). As an adjective, "dumb", "asinine", "moronic", etc. Not to be confused with "Huey" from the Aztec title "Huey Tlatoani", in which "Huey" is a term of reverence.
- hablar con: "to talk with (on the telephone)". Used in place of the standard llamar.
- jitomate: red tomato, in contrast to tomatillos.
- macho: "manly". Applied to a woman (macha): "manly" or "skillful". From macho, male.
- mamón: stuck up, arrogant. Considered vulgar.
- menso: dumb, foolish. Euphemistic in nature.
- naco: "a low-class, boorish, foolish, ignorant and/or uneducated person". Pejorative.
- órale: (1) similar to English "Wow!" (2) "Okay". (3) Exclamation of surprised protest. Sometimes abbreviated ¡Ora! in informal speech. May be considered rude.
- padre: used as an adjective to denote something "cool", attractive, good, fun, etc. E.g. Esta música está muy padre, "This music is very cool." Literally, "father".
- pedo: "problem" or "fight". Literally "fart". Also, in a greeting, ¿Qué pedo, güey? ("What's up, dude?"). As an adjective, "drunk", e.g. estar pedo, "to be drunk". Also the noun peda: "a drunken gathering". All forms are considered vulgar for their connection to pedo, "fart".
- pelo chino: "curly hair". The word chino derives from the Spanish word cochino, "pig". The phrase originally referenced the casta (racial type) known as chino, meaning a person of mixed indigenous and African ancestry whose hair was curly. Sometimes erroneously thought to be derived from Spanish chino, "Chinese".
- pinche: "damned", "lousy", more akin to "freaking". E.g. Quita tu pinche música de aquí. ("Take your lousy music from here"). As a noun, literally, "kitchen assistant". Considered vulgar.
- popote: "drinking straw". From Nahuatl popōtl [popoːt͡ɬ], the name of a plant from which brooms and drinking straws are made, or the straws themselves.
- rentar: "to rent"
- ¿Cómo la ves?: "What do you think about it?" Literally "How do you see it?"
- ¡Híjole!: An exclamation, used variously to express surprise, frustration, etc. From hijo de... ("son of a..."). Also ¡Híjoles!.
- ¿Mande?: "Beg your pardon?". From mandar, "to order", formal command form. ¿Cómo? (literally "How?"), as in other countries, is also in use. The use of ¿Qué? ("What?") on its own is sometimes considered impolite, unless accompanied by a verb: ¿Qué dijiste? ("What did you say?").
- ¿Qué onda?: "What's up?". Literally, "What's the vibe?".
- valer madre: to be worthless. Literally "to be worth (a) mother".

Most of the words above are considered informal (e.g. chavo(a), padre, güero, etc.), rude (güey, naco, ¿cómo (la) ves?, etc.) or vulgar (e.g. chingadera, pinche, pedo) and are limited to slang use among friends or in informal settings; foreigners need to exercise caution in their use. In 2009, at an audience for the signing of a Memorandum of Understanding between Mexico and the Netherlands, the then Crown Prince of the Netherlands, Willem-Alexander, made a statement to the audience with a word that, in Mexican Spanish, is considered very vulgar. Evidently oblivious to the word's different connotations in different countries, the prince's Argentine interpreter used the word chingada as the ending to the familiar Mexican proverb "Camarón que se duerme se lo lleva la corriente" (A sleeping shrimp is carried away by the tide), without realizing the vulgarity associated with the word in Mexico. The prince, also unaware of the differences, proceeded to say the word, to the bemusement and offense of some of the attendees.

== Similar dialects ==
New Mexico Spanish has many similarities with an older version of Mexican Spanish, and can be considered part of a Mexican Spanish "macro-dialect". The small amount of Philippine Spanish has traditionally been influenced by Mexican Spanish, as the colony was initially administered from Mexico City, before being administered directly from Madrid, and had extensive contact via the Manila galleon to Acapulco. Chavacano, a Spanish-based creole language in the Philippines, is based on Mexican Spanish. To outsiders, the accents of nearby Spanish-speaking countries in northern Central America, such as El Salvador and Guatemala, might sound similar to those spoken in Mexico, especially in central and southern Mexico.

== Influence of Nahuatl ==
The Spanish of Mexico has had various indigenous languages as a linguistic substrate. Particularly significant has been the influence of Nahuatl, especially in the lexicon. However, while in the vocabulary its influence is undeniable, it is hardly felt in the grammar field. In the lexicon, in addition to the words that originated from Mexico with which the Spanish language has been enriched, such as tomate "tomato", hule "rubber", tiza "chalk", chocolate "chocolate", coyote "coyote", petaca "flask", et cetera; the Spanish of Mexico has many Nahuatlismos that confer a lexical personality of its own. It can happen that the Nahuatl word coexists with the Spanish word, as in the cases of cuate "buddy" and amigo "friend", guajolote "turkey" and pavo "turkey", chamaco "kid" and niño "boy", mecate "rope" and reata "rope", etc. On other occasions, the indigenous word differs slightly from the Spanish, as in the case of huarache, which is another type of sandal; tlapalería, hardware store, molcajete, a stone mortar, etc. Other times, the Nahuatl word has almost completely displaced the Spanish, tecolote "owl", atole "cornflour drink", popote "straw", milpa "cornfield", ejote "green bean", jacal "shack", papalote "kite", etc. There are many indigenismos "words of indigenous origin" who designate Mexican realities for which there is no Spanish word; mezquite "mesquite", zapote "sapota", jícama "jicama", ixtle "ixtle", cenzontle "mockingbird", tuza "husk", pozole, tamales, huacal "crate", comal "hotplate", huipil "embroidered blouse", metate "stone for grinding", etc. The strength of the Nahuatl substrate influence is felt less each day, since there are no new contributions.

- Frequently used Nahuatlismos: aguacate "avocado", cacahuate "peanut", cacao "cocoa", coyote "coyote", cuate "buddy", chapulín "chapulin", chicle "gum", chocolate "chocolate", ejote "bean", elote "corn", huachinango "huachinango", guajolote "turkey", hule "rubber", jitomate "tomato", mayate "Mayan (used for people of African descent)", mecate "rope", milpa "cornfield", olote "corn husk", papalote "kite", petaca "flask" (per suitcase), piocha "goatee", zopilote "buzzard."
- Moderately frequent Nahuatlismos: ajolote "axolotl", chichi "boob" (for female breast), jacal "shack, hut" xocoyote "youngest child", tecolote "owl", tianguis "street market", tlapalería "hardware store", zacate "grass."
- Purépechismos or Tarasquismos: huarache "sandal", jorongo "poncho", cotorina "jerkin", soricua, tacuche "bundle of rags" (slang for suit), achoque "salamander", corunda pirecua.
- Other non-Mexican indigenismos: arepa "flatbread corn", butaca "armchair", cacique "chief, headman", caimán "alligator", canoa "canoe", coatí "coati", colibrí "hummingbird", chirimoya "custard apple", naguas "rags", guayaba "guava", huracán "hurricane", iguana "iguana", jaguar "jaguar", jaiba "crab", jefén "jefen", loro "parrot", maguey "agave", maíz "corn", mamey "mammee", maní "peanut", ñame "yam", ñandú "rhea", papaya "papaya", piragua "canoe", puma "puma", tabaco "tobacco", tapioca " yuca "cassava."

The extensive use of diminutives in Mexican Spanish has been cited as an example of Nahuatl influence.

The use of the suffix -le to give an emphatic character to the imperative form of verbs has also been attributed to Nahuatl. For example: brinca "jump" > bríncale, come "eat" > cómele, pasa "go/proceed" > pásale. This suffix is considered to be a crossover of the Spanish indirect object pronoun -le with the Nahua excitable interjections, such as cuele "strain." That the suffix is not in fact an indirect object pronoun can be seen by the fact that it is also used in non-verbal constructions, such as hijo "son" > híjole "damn", ahora "now" > órale "wow", ¿que hubo? "what's up?" > quihúbole "how's it going?", etc.

Navarro Ibarra (2009) offers an alternative explanation of -le as an intensifier, claiming that, instead of working as an indirect object pronoun, -le modifies the verb in such a way that the event it indicates "involves the realization of the event itself as an abstract goal".

== Influence of English ==
Mexico has a border of more than 2,500 kilometers with the United States, and receives major influxes of American and Canadian tourists every year. More than 63% of the 57 million Latinos in the United States are assumed as of Mexican origin. English is the most studied foreign language in Mexico, and the third most spoken after Spanish and the native languages taken together. Given these circumstances, anglicisms in Mexican Spanish are continuously increasing (as they are also in the rest of the Americas and Spain), including filmar "to film", béisbol "baseball", club "club", coctel "cocktail", líder "leader", cheque "check", sándwich "sandwich", etc. Mexican Spanish also uses other anglicisms that are not used in all Spanish-speaking countries, including bye, ok, nice, cool, checar "to check", fólder "folder", overol "overalls", réferi "referee", lonchera "lunch bag", clóset "closet", maple "maple syrup", baby shower, etc.

English influence, at least in border cities, may result in lower use of the subjunctive, as indicated by a study finding that, among residents of Reynosa, greater contact with the American side correlated with lower use of the subjunctive. This parallels a greater reduction in the use of the subjunctive among Mexican-Americans.

The center of Hispanic Linguistics of UNAM carried out a number of surveys in the project of coordinated study of the cultured linguistic norms of major cities of Ibero-America and of the Iberian Peninsula. The total number of anglicisms was about 4% among Mexican speakers of urban norms. However, this figure includes anglicisms that permeated general Spanish long ago and which are not particular to Mexico, such as buffete, náilon "nylon", hockey, rimel, ron "rum", vagón "railroad car", búfer "buffer", and others.

The results of this research are summarized as follows:

- Nouns are more likely to be loaned from English than other parts of speech.
- Anglicisms in general use: O.K. (oquéi), bistec "(beef) steak", bye (bai), chequera "checkbook", clic "click", basquetbol "basketball", bate "baseball bat", béisbol "baseball", box(eo) "boxing", cláxon "horn", clip, clóset "closet", clutch, coctel "cocktail", champú or shampoo (shampú), cheque "check", DJ (diyei, disk jockey), romance, smoking or esmoquin, exprés "express", football (futból), gol "goal", hit, jonrón (homerun), jeep, jet, van, nocaut or knockout, líder "leader", náilon or nylon, overol "overalls", panqué "poundcake", pay "pie", pudín "pudding", baby shower, rating or ráting, reversa "reverse", rin (rim), round (raund), set, shorts, show, strike (stráik or estráik), suéter "sweater", pants, tenis (tennis shoes), thinner, super "super market", fólder "folder", tenis or tennis, vóleibol "volleyball", vallet parking, and güisqui or whisk(e)y.
- Frequent Anglicisms: bar, bermudas (for Bermuda shorts), birra "beer", sport (type of clothing), switch.
- Moderately used Anglicisms: barman "waiter", King/Queen size, grill, manager, penthouse, pullman, strapless, ziper or zipper.

Some examples of syntactic anglicisms, which coexist with the common variants, are:

- Using the verb apply/applying. ("Apliqué a esa universidad", I applied to that university, instead of "Postulé a esta universidad", I applied to this university)
- Using the verb to assume with suppose. ("Asumo que sí va a ir a la fiesta", I assume he is going to the party, instead of "Supongo que sí va a ir a la fiesta", I guess he will go to the party)
- Using the verb access with access to. ("Accesa a nuestra página de internet", Access our website, instead of "Accede a nuestra página de internet", Access our website).

== See also ==
- Languages of Mexico
- Standard Spanish
- List of colloquial expressions in Honduras
