= Pinacate =

Pinacate may refer to:

- Pinacate beetle also known as the stink beetle or acrobat beetle
- Pinacate, California, small settlement on the Santa Fe Railroad
- Pinacate Mining District in Riverside County, California
- Pinacate Peaks are volcanic peaks in northwest Mexico
- El Pinacate y Gran Desierto de Altar Biosphere Reserve, Mexican biosphere reserve including the Pinacate Peaks
