= Nahuatlismo =

Linguistics concept

Nahuatlism is the term used to refer to words in the Spanish language that originate from Nahuatl. It is also known in Spanish by the name “aztequismo” (or “Aztec-ism”) Many nahuatlisms are only known in Mexican Spanish, since the majority of Nahuatl speakers are concentrated in the country. Other nahuatlisms have entered a wide variety of languages, including English, almost always as loan words drawn from Spanish.

The use of nahuatlisms in the Spanish language is one of the distinctive characteristics of Mexican Spanish. With nahuatlisms being a subject of cultural importance, there exists a large number of studies regarding the frequency of their use and their prevalence among different layers of the Mexican population. These topics tend to be a point of contention among researchers.

== Origin and current use of nahuatlisms ==
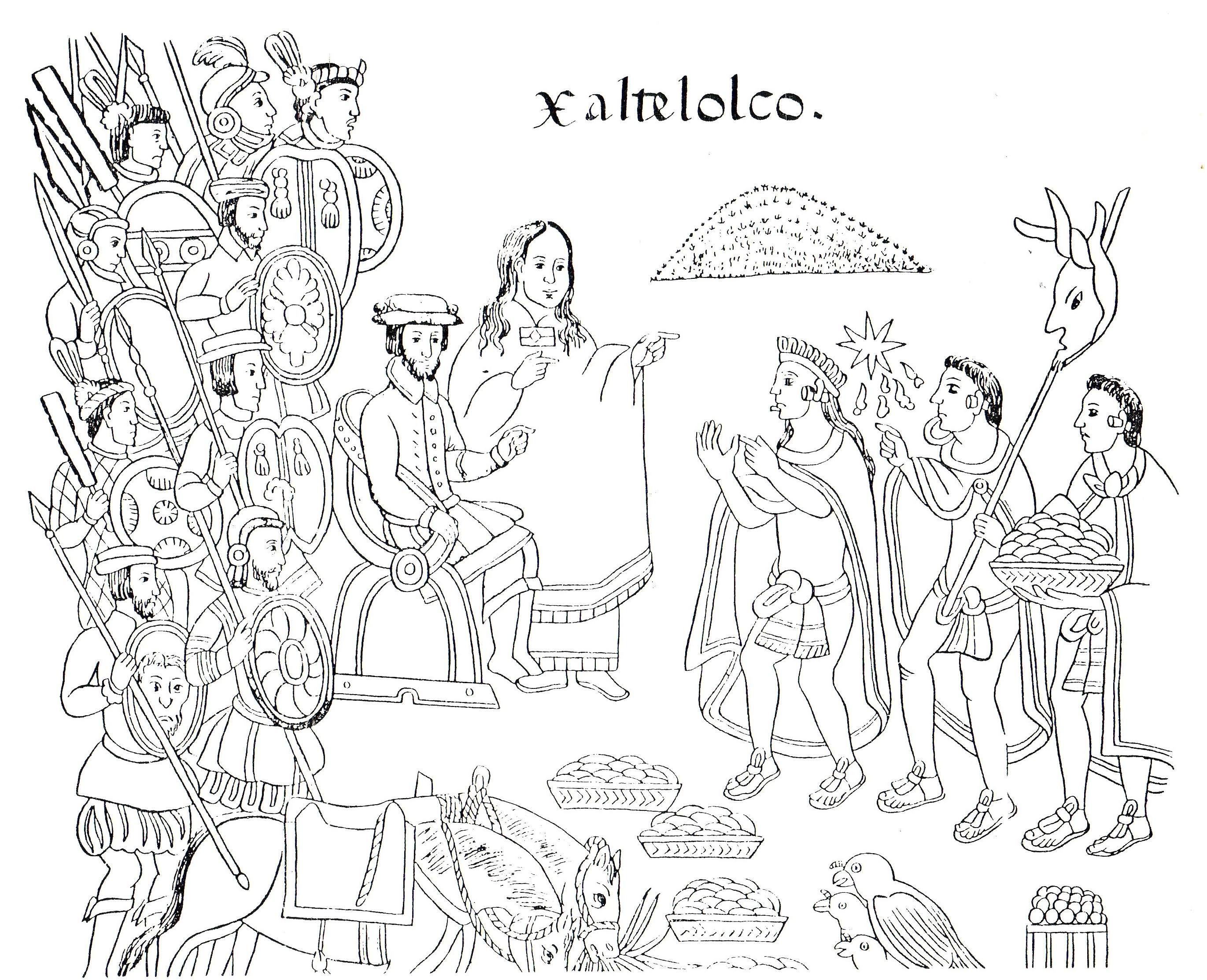
La Malinche, who appears in the center of this image, was one of the first lenguas that served the Spaniards. Her name is a Hispanicization of Malintzin, which is also an example of a nahuatlism used for a person who preferred foreign countries to his or her own.

Nahuatlisms began to enter the Spanish lexicon in the 16th century, with the first contact between Spanish speakers and Nahuatl-speaking populations in Mesoamerica. Just as they adopted numerous words from the Taíno language in the Antilles and from Quechua in South America, Spaniards borrowed words from indigenous languages in Mesoamerica, mainly from Maya and Nahuatl. Although some of these words were used to describe concepts that were unknown to Europeans, others ended up replacing their Spanish equivalents.

To be able to understand the natives, Spaniards resorted at first to interpreters called “lenguas” (meaning “languages” or “tongues”). The first lenguas were Gerónimo de Aguilar and La Malinche. Not too long after the Conquest of the Aztec Empire, missionaries were concerned with learning the languages of the populations that they were attempting to Christianize. In the case of Nahuatl, of note are the works of Bernardino de Sahagún and Toribio de Benavente Motolinia, who disseminated works about its grammar and vocabulary. The linguistic diversity of Mesoamerica encouraged the adoption of Nahuatl as a lingua franca, which allowed many populations to simplify communication by learning it. The recognition of Nahuatl on behalf of the Spanish crown as the lingua franca facilitated its diffusion across a considerable territory that comprised New Spain from Sinaloa up to Costa Rica. Previously, during the reign of Carlos III, colonial authorities in Spain were in favor of eliminating indigenous languages, including Nahuatl, and Hispanicizing all indigenous populations. Franciscans at the time rejected this measure.

Despite such intentions to eradicate indigenous languages, many words were transmitted from Nahuatl to Spanish. These borrowings have continued into the 21st century, with Nahuatl being the indigenous language with the greatest number of speakers in Mexico. The use of nahuatlisms has sparked discussion among researchers interested in the topic. It is said that their use is greater in rural areas than in urban areas, as many of them refer to instruments, techniques, and objects that have disappeared in urban contexts. Others have disappeared in everyday speech but are preserved in popular sayings. (Note: For example, the word chimisclán (bran bread that looks similar in shape to another bread called “cocol” but without egg varnish or sesame) refers to a type of bread that no longer exists but remains in the saying Ay cocol, ¿ya no te acuerdas de cuando eras chimisclán?, meaning, “Hey cocol, don’t you remember when you used to be a chimisclán?”)

== Phonetic characteristics of nahuatlisms ==
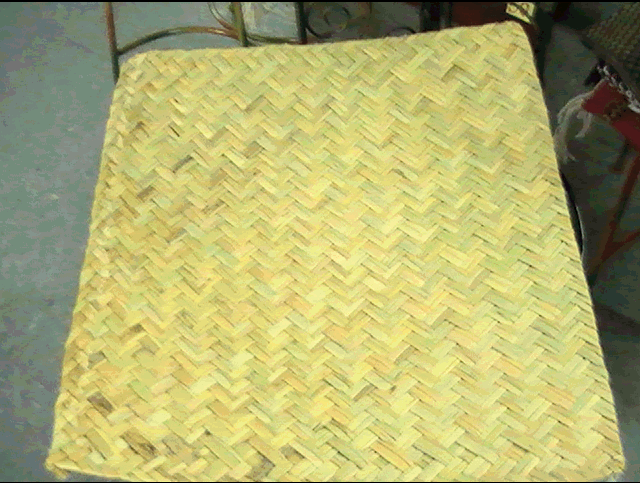
The Spanish word petate has given rise to other common nahuatlisms such as petatearse (“to die”), petatear (meaning “to bluff” in a card game), and petatazo (the smell of marijuana).

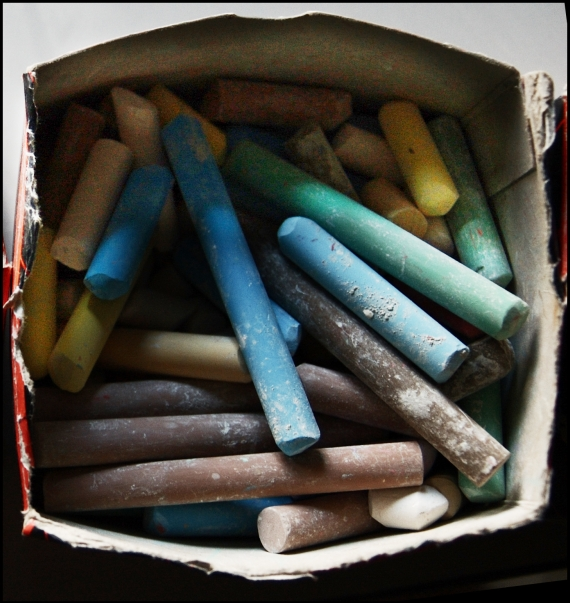
The Spanish word tiza is a nahuatlism used to refer to sticks of chalk. The word is seldom used in Mexico, with the Hellenism gis used in its place. In Central America, they are referred called yeso.

Nahuatl and Spanish have differences in their phonemic repertoires. Some phonemes that appear frequently in Nahuatl, such as [t͡ɬ], [ʦ] and [ʃ], have undergone more-or-less consistent transformations when transmitted in nahuatlisms. Such changes include the following: (Note: The changes coincide with those described by García Frazier (2006, p. 78))

- The phoneme [t͡ɬ] at the end of a word underwent varying changes. In some cases, an [e] was appended, and the final phoneme [t͡ɬ] became [t], giving rise to the common ending -te. Some examples are the words elote (<élotl), meaning “corn cob”; metate (métatl), which refers to a mealing stone; and petate (<pétatl), a type of bedroll. In other cases, [t͡ɬ] at the end of a word transformed into [l], such as in words like cempasúchil (<cempoalxóchitl), a type of flower. Still in other cases, the phoneme in question disappeared completely, for example in tiza (<tízatl), or “chalk.” An important present-day exception is the nahuatlism náhuatl, or “Nahuatl,” which preserves the “tl” sound in Spanish. However, this has not always been the case, since the form “nahuate” was also used at one point.
- The sound [t͡ɬ] at the beginning or in the middle of a word almost always remained intact going from Nahuatl to Spanish. Some examples are xoloitzcuintle (<xoloitzcuintli), a breed of dog; tlacoyo (<tlatlaoyoh), a type of dish; and tlapalería (<tlapalli), meaning “hardware store.”
- The combination -[ɬ:i] at the end of a word often transformed into -[le]. In other words, the long “l” in Nahuatl became a standard “l” in Spanish, and the closed front vowel “i” became the open front vowel “e”. There are many examples of this phonological change, such as atole (<atolli), a type of beverage; pinole (<pinolli), a corn-based powder; and pozole (<pozolli), a type of soup. In other cases, the final vowel disappeared, leaving a final -[l] by itself, as can be found in words like tamal (<tamalli), a type of food; jacal (xalcalli), meaning “hut”; and escamol (azcamolli), or “Mexican caviar.”
- In nahuatlisms, the sound [ʦ] often transformed into [ʧ]. Examples can be found in La Malinche (<Malintzin); chicle (<tzictli), meaning “gum”; and apapacho (<papatzoa), roughly meaning “physical affection.” In other cases, the plosive aspect disappeared from the Nahuatl phoneme and entered Spanish as a fricative [s]. This is the case in words like escuincle (<itzcuintli), meaning “child”; huauzontle (<huautzontli), a type of plant; and zapote (<tzápotl), a type of fruit. Despite being pronounced in speech as [s], this sound tends to be written in nahuatlisms as a “z,” indicating its etymology.
- The sound [ʃ] underwent changes similar to those that occurred in Spanish around the 16th century. In some cases, it turned into [s], for example in the toponym Súchil (<xóchitl). In other words, it transformed into [h], represented by the letter “j” in Spanish, such as in ajolote (<axólotl), meaning “axolotl”, and jonote (<xóntol), a type of tree. Only in some words did it remain intact, such as in mixiote (<mexiotl), a type of dish, and xoloitzcuintle (<xoloitzcuintli).

== Toponyms of Nahuatl origin ==
Toponyms of Nahuatl origin are abundant in central Mexico. In the states of Mexico, Morelos, Puebla, Veracruz, Tlaxcala, and Guerrero, the majority of municipalities bear names of Nahuatl origin. That being said, Nahuatl toponyms can currently be found from Sinaloa up to Guanacaste, Costa Rica. Various Nahuatl toponyms replaced the names that the Spaniards gave to existing indigenous populations upon their arrival, such as in the case of Tepeaca (<Tepeyácac), which Hernán Cortés named “Segura de la Frontera.” In many cases, the original toponyms were followed by the name of a patron saint designated by the religious Spaniards. In the case of Mexico, the name of a notable figure was added to toponyms after the independence of several indigenous population. Examples of this process are the names of cities like Toluca de Lerdo, Miahuatlán de Porfirio Díaz, and Cuautepec de Hinojosa. Some cases like San Bartolo Naucalpan de Juárez reflect all the styles by which Nahuatl toponyms have entered the everyday speech of Spanish-speakers in Mexico.

== Studies regarding Spanish vocabulary of Nahuatl origin ==
The first systematic studies regarding Spanish vocabulary of Nahuatl origin were carried out in the 19th century, the works of Cecilio Robelo being a prime example. This Mexican author investigated the indigenous toponyms of the states of central Mexico and systematized a “Dictionary of aztequismos” (Diccionario de aztequismos), to which he added over 2000 words that included toponyms, demonyms, and words of common use. Robelo also placed special importance on the repertoire of popular sayings in which indigenous words appeared. According to the author, only with a knowledge of aztequismos could one completely teach Spanish as it is spoken in Mexico.

== See also ==
- List of Spanish words of Nahuatl origin

== Bibliography ==
- García Frazier, Elena (2006). "Préstamos del náhuatl al español mexicano". Hesperia: Anuario de filología hispánica (in Spanish). 9: 75–86. ISSN 1139-3181.
- Karttunen, Frances E. (1983). An analytical dictionary of Nahuatl. Austin: University of Texas Press. ISBN 0-8061-2421-0.
- Montemayor, Carlos (2007). Diccionario del náhuatl en el español de México (in Spanish). Universidad Nacional Autónoma de México.
- Moreno de Alba, José G. (1988). El español de América (in Spanish). Mexico: Fondo de Cultura Económica.
- Zavala, Silvio (1995). "El español, ¿lengua obligatoria?" (PDF). In Ward, Aengus W.; Whicker, Jules; Flitter, Derek W. (eds.). Actas del XII Congreso de la Asociación Internacional de Hispanistas (in Spanish). pp. 41–47. ISBN 0704418991.
