= Texcoco =

Texcoco or Tezcoco may refer to:

== Mexico ==
- Texcoco (altepetl), the pre-Columbian Mesoamerican city-state and founder of the Aztec Triple Alliance
- Texcoco, State of Mexico, the modern-day Mexican municipality, which includes the city of Texcoco de Mora
- Lake Texcoco, a former lake in the Valley of Mexico

== U.S.A. ==
- Tezcuco (Burnside, Louisiana) plantation, listed on the NRHP in Ascension Parish, Louisiana
