= List of colloquial expressions in Honduras =

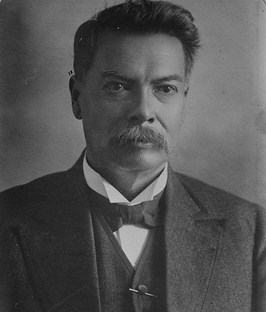
Alberto de Jesús Membreño

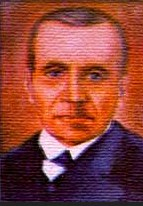
Francisco Cruz Castro

The list of colloquial expressions in Honduras (hondureñismos) are Spanish expressions that are unique to Honduras.

In 1899, Alberto de Jesus Membreño published the first dictionary with the title "Hondureñismos. Provincial Vocabulary of Honduras." It contains mostly the words and expressions in “La botica del pueblo,” a book by Francisco Cruz Castro. In the 22nd edition of the Dictionary of the Royal Spanish Academy, published in 2001, the Academia Hondureña de la Lengua contributed 1,950 words.

== Hondureñismos ==
- Bululo: Bread roll (La Ceiba)
- Cipote/a: boy/girl
- Güirro/a: boy/girl
- Trucha: Corner shop
