= John M. Lipski =

American linguist

- Education: Rice University, University of Alberta
- Occupation: Linguist

John Michael Lipski is an American linguist who is most widely known for his work on Spanish and Portuguese dialectology and variation. His research also focuses on Spanish phonology, the linguistic aspects of bilingualism and code-switching, African influences on Spanish and Portuguese, and pidgin and creole studies. He is currently the Edwin Erle Sparks Professor of Spanish Linguistics in the Department of Spanish, Italian, and Portuguese at the Pennsylvania State University. He previously served as the head of the same department from 2001 to 2005.

== Biography ==
Lipski studied Spanish and mathematics as an undergraduate at Rice University (1971). He has stated, however, in casual conversation during his tenure at the University of Houston in the 1980s that he never took a Spanish class, and that he was self-taught in the language. This appears to be the case with Portuguese as well, which Lipski has personally referred to as a "free" language of sorts if one already knows Spanish. So his Spanish studies as an undergraduate must have been rather advanced, or independent studies, as opposed to Spanish I or II and the like. He earned both his MA (1972) and his PhD (1974) in Romance linguistics at the University of Alberta, with extensive training in classic Romance philology and European structuralism. His doctoral dissertation was a comparative historical phonology of Spanish, Italian, and Portuguese.

Following the completion of his PhD, Lipski worked as a Spanish instructor at Kean College of New Jersey (1973–1975), where his interactions with Cuban and Puerto Rican Spanish speakers would eventually lead him to study Spanish dialectal variation and sociolinguistics. He later worked at Michigan State University (1975–1981), first as an assistant professor and later as a tenured associate professor (1978–1981). Lipski also worked as an associate professor at the University of Houston (1981–1988), as a professor of Spanish and linguistics at the University of Florida (1988–1992), and as a professor of Spanish linguistics at the University of New Mexico (1992–2000).

He currently works as a professor of Spanish linguistics at the Pennsylvania State University (2000–present), and he is a core faculty member on Penn State's Center for Language Science's National Science Foundation PIRE grant.

Lipski is married and has two children.

== Bibliography ==
=== Books written ===
El habla de los Cognos de Panamá en el contexto de la lingüística afrohispánica. Panamá: Instituto Nacional de Cultura, in press.

Afro-Bolivian Spanish. Frankfurt and Madrid: Vervuert/Iberoamericana, 2008.

Varieties of Spanish in the United States. Georgetown University Press, 2008.

A History of Afro-Hispanic Language: Five Centuries, Five Continents. Cambridge University Press, 2005.

El español de América. Madrid: Cátedra, 1996. Japanese translation 2004, Editorial Phoenix.

Latin American Spanish. London: Longmans, 1994.

El español de Malabo: procesos fonéticos/fonológicos e implicaciones dialectológicas. Madrid/Malabo: Centro Cultural Hispano-Guineano, 1990.

The Language of the Isleños of Louisiana. Baton Rouge: Louisiana State University Press, 1990.

The Speech of the Negros Congos of Panama: a Vestigial Afro-Hispanic Creole. Amsterdam: Benjamins, 1989.

Fonética y fonología del español de Honduras. Tegucigalpa, Editorial Guaymuras, 1987.

The Spanish of Equatorial Guinea. Tübingen: Max Niemeyer, 1985. Linguistic Aspects of Spanish-English Language Shifting. Arizona State University, Latin American Studies Center, 1985.

(with Eduardo Neale-Silva), El español en síntesis. New York: Holt, Rinehart & Winston, 1981.
