= Dominican Spanish =

Variety of Spanish language

- Español dominicano
- Pronunciation: [espaˈɲol dominiˈkano]
- Native to: Dominican Republic
- Ethnicity: Dominicans
- Native speakers: 13 million (Including Dominican diaspora in other countries and immigrants living in Dominican Republic) (2014); 9 million (only including Dominicans in DR)
- Language family: Indo-European: Italic; Latino-Faliscan; Latin; Romance; Italo-Western; Western; Iberian; West Iberian; Castilian; Spanish; Andalusian and Canarian Spanish; Caribbean Spanish; Dominican Spanish
- Early forms: Old Latin: Vulgar Latin; Proto-Romance; Old Spanish; Early Modern Spanish
- Writing system: Spanish alphabet (Latin script)

Official status
- Regulated by: Academia Dominicana de la Lengua

Language codes
- ISO 639-1: es
- ISO 639-2: spa
- ISO 639-3: –
- Glottolog: None
- IETF: es-DO

Dominican Spanish (español dominicano) is Spanish as spoken in the Dominican Republic; and also among the Dominican diaspora, most of whom live in the United States, chiefly in New York City, New Jersey, Connecticut, Rhode Island, Massachusetts, Pennsylvania, and Florida.

Dominican Spanish, a Caribbean variety of Spanish, is based on the Andalusian and Canarian Spanish dialects of southern Spain, and has influences from Native Taíno and other Arawakan languages. Speakers of Dominican Spanish may also use conservative words that are similar to older variants of Spanish. The variety spoken in the Cibao region is influenced by the 16th and 17th-century Spanish and Portuguese colonists in the Cibao valley, and shows a greater than average influence by the 18th-century Canarian settlers.

Despite the large share of African ancestry among Dominicans (see Afro-Dominicans), the African element in the local Spanish is not as important as one might expect.

There is also a significant influence from African languages in the Spanish spoken by Haitian and Afro-Caribbean migrant descendants in the Dominican Republic, particularly in grammar and phonetics. However, second generation immigrants from Haiti speak very closely to Dominican standard speech, if not actually speaking it, assimilating into the mainstream speech.

== History ==
Most of the Spanish-speaking settlers came from Andalusia (southern Spain) and the Canary Islands. When they first arrived in what is now the Dominican Republic, the first native people they had contact with were the Arawak-speaking Taino people.

Spanish, just as in other Latin American countries, completely replaced the indigenous languages (Taíno, Macorix and Ciguayo) of the Dominican Republic to the point where they became entirely extinct, mainly due to the fact that the majority of the indigenous population quickly died out only a few years after European contact.

However, when the Spanish arrived, they found the flora and fauna of the island, as well as various cultural artifacts, very different from those of Spain, so many of the words used by the natives to name these things were conserved and assimilated, thereby enriching Spanish lexicon. Some of these words include: ají, anón, batata, barbacoa, bejuco, bija, caiman, canoa, caoba, conuco, guanábana, guayaba, hamaca, hobo (jobo), hutía, iguana, jagua, maní, papaya (lechosa), sabana, yuca.

Dominican Spanish also includes words indirectly borrowed from African languages via Portuguese, such as cachimbo, which was borrowed from the Portuguese word "cacimba", having the latter being borrowed from the Bantu "cazimba". Many of these African influences are quite distant and left a minor impact on modern day Dominican Spanish, and usually these words are also used in other Spanish-speaking countries as far-away as Argentina; therefore it is not just a phenomenon restricted to the Dominican Republic but common in the Latin American Spanish (compared to European Spanish). Dominican Spanish has also received some limited influence from Haitian Creole, due to the Haitian occupation of Santo Domingo and continuing cross-border contacts. Haitian influence is stronger in border regions. Haitian Creole and Samaná English have also influenced the speech of Samaná Province further adding to the African influence found in the dialect.

== Phonology ==
- Like most other Spanish dialects, Dominican Spanish features yeísmo: the sounds represented by ll (the palatal lateral /ʎ/) and y (historically the palatal approximant /ʝ/) have fused into one. This merged phoneme is generally pronounced as a [ʝ] or [ɟʝ]. That is, in the Dominican Republic (as in most of Latin America and Spain), se cayó "he fell down" is homophonous with se calló "he became silent / he shut up".
- Dominican Spanish has seseo (there is no distinction between /θ/ and /s/). That is, caza ("hunt") is homophonous with casa ("house"). Seseo is common to nearly all of Hispanic America, the Canary Islands, and southern Spain.
- Strong contraction in everyday speech is common, as in "voy a" into "vuá" or "voá", or "¿para adónde vas?" into "¿p'a'nde va'?". Another example: "David 'tá 'co'ta'o", from "David está acostado" ("David is lying down / David is sleeping"), though vowel degemination is normal in most Spanish dialects, cf. Standard Peninsular "David est'acostado", normally pronounced with a single [a].
- The fricative /s/ has a tendency to disappear or to become a voiceless glottal fricative [h] at the end of syllables. The change may be realized only at the word level or it may also cross word boundaries. That is, las mesas son blancas "the tables are white" is pronounced [lah ˈmesah som ˈblaŋkah] (or [lah ˈmesa som ˈblaŋkah], with a degeminated [s]), but in las águilas azules "the blue eagles", syllable-final /s/ in las and águilas might be resyllabified into the initial syllable of the following vowel-initial words and remain [s] ([laˈsaɣilasaˈsuleh]), or become [h] (it varies by speaker). Aspiration or disappearance of syllable-final /s/ is common to much of Hispanic America, the Canary Islands, and southern Spain. Syllable-final [s] is less frequently reduced in formal speech, like TV broadcasts.
  - Example 1: To say lo niño or los niño, instead of los niños
  - Example 2: To say lluvia ailada or lluvias ailada, instead of lluvias aisladas
- Syllable-initial /s/ can occasionally be aspirated as well in rural parts of El Cibao. This occurs most often in the reflexive pronoun se and in sí 'yes'.
- In some areas, speakers tend to drop the final r sound in verb infinitives. The elision is considered a feature of uneducated speakers in some places, but it is widespread in others, at least in rapid speech.
- Syllable-final r tends to be changed in many words by an i sound in the Northerly Cibao and in El Seibo Province and by an l (L) in the Eastern and in the capital city (Santo Domingo): the verb correr (to run) is pronounced correi and correl respectively, and perdón (forgiveness) becomes peidón and peldón. Final /l/ is also merged into -/i̯/ in El Cibao and El Seibo. This substitution with the i is delicately (almost mutely) present in Andalusian Spanish, and also the l use is prototypical, and more marked, in Puerto Rican Spanish. It is believed to be of Andalusian origin.
- The "d" is silent in the common word-ending -ado. For example, the words casado (married) and lado (side, way) are pronounced as casao and lao in Dominican Spanish.
- In a few parts of the country, an "el" at the end of a word is pronounced as "err." For example, Miguel may be pronounced as Miguer in Dominican Spanish, a feature shared with Andalusian Spanish and in contrast to Puerto Rican Spanish, where the reverse occurs, e.g. pronouncing the name Arturo (Arthur) as Alturo.
- Word-final /n/ is typically velarized at the end of a phrase or before another word starting in a vowel. Final /n/ may also be velarized word internally. In rural El Cibao, final /n/ may also be completely elided, typically nasalizing the preceding vowel, but occasionally it can be dropped entirely with no trace of nasalization. That total elision is most common among children.
- The alveolar trill /r/ and even the tap /ɾ/ can be replaced with a uvular trill among some rural speakers from El Cibao.
- In rural parts of El Cibao, final unstressed vowels are often reduced in intensity and length, and post-tonic /o/ can be raised to /u/, thus gallo 'rooster' can be pronounced like gallu. In oyó, third person singular preterite form of oír 'to hear', the initial /o/ is often also raised to /u/ by rural Cibaeños: /uˈʝo/.

Other differences with Standard Spanish include adding the s erroneously, thus overcompensating the habit of omitting it.

Example 1:

- standard: administraciones públicas [aðministɾaˈsjones ˈpuβlikas] [public administrations]
- vernacular: aminitracione pública [aminitɾaˈsjone ˈpuβlika]
- hypercorrected: asministracione púsblica [asministɾaˈsjone ˈpusβlika]

Example 2:

- standard: jaguar [jaguar]
- vernacular: jagual / jaguai
- hypercorrected: jasguar

The hypercorrected form is often part of a blatantly sarcastic mode of speech, commonly used for joking rather than everyday speech. It's often called hablar fisno 'speaking finely', with an extra 's' in fino. Among rural children in El Cibao, s-insertion is still common, which calls into question its status as a hypercorrection since these children have little exposure to standard forms of speech. Word-internally, s-insertion is most common before voiceless stop consonants, especially /t/, and almost never occurs before nasals. Rural residents of El Cibao frequently insert an s after function words, as in des todo 'of everything'. This is typically before stop consonants but can occasionally be before vowels, as in des animales 'of animals'. Some speakers also use final s-insertion as a prosodic boundary marker.

There are also hypercorrections of the merger of -/r/ and -/l/ into -/i̯/. For example, Haití 'Haiti' may be pronounced Artís.

== Grammar ==
Voseo is unknown in Dominican Spanish.

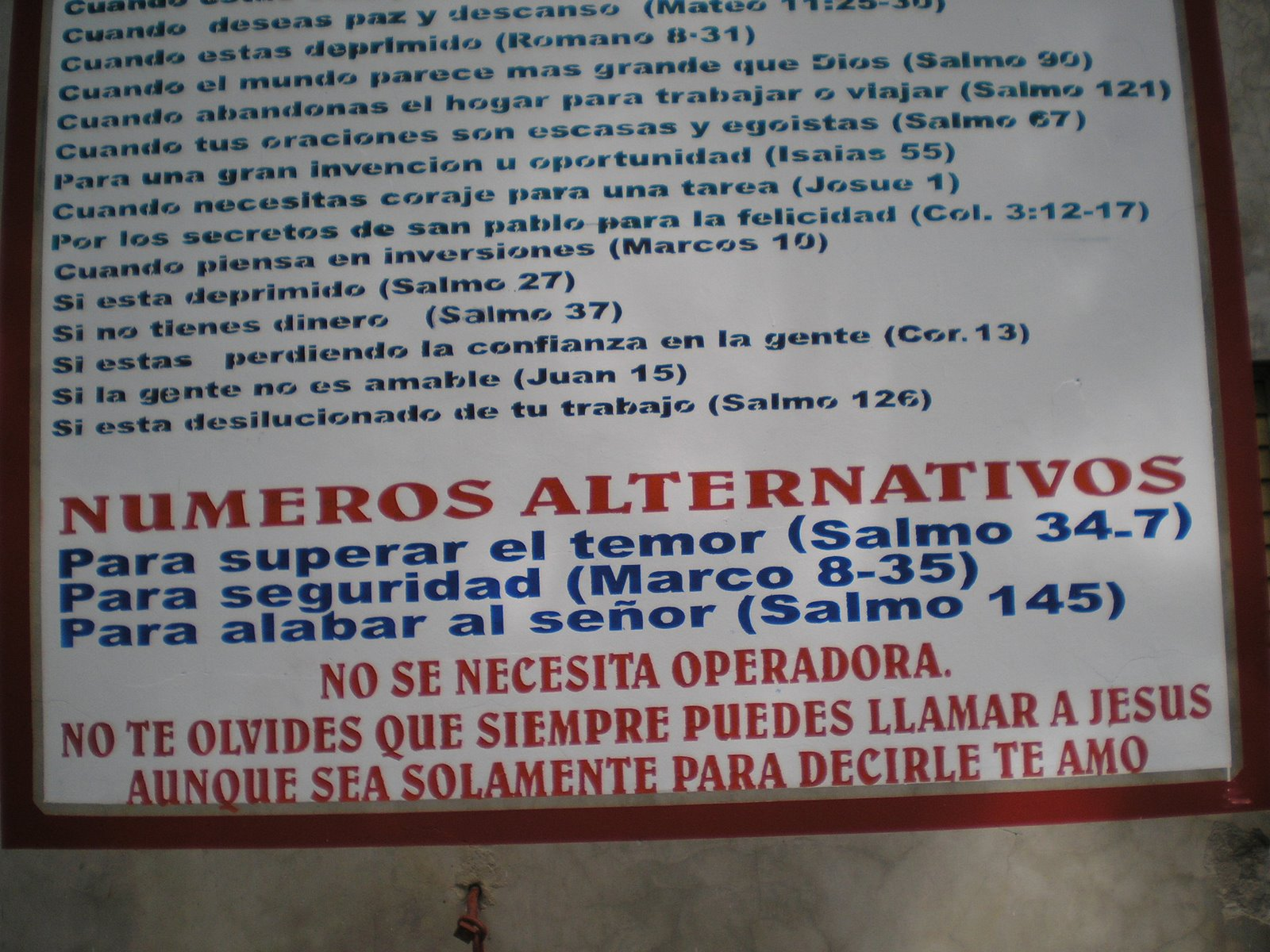
Spanish-language sign in San Víctor

Some well-known grammatical features of Dominican Spanish include the use of overt dummy pronouns, as in ello hay arroz 'there is rice', especially prominent in El Cibao, instead of hay arroz, and double negation, as in yo no voy no 'I am not going'. Both of those are associated with more marginalized sociolects.

Pedro Henríquez Ureña claims that, at least until 1940, the educated population of the Dominican Republic continued to use the future subjunctive verb forms (hablare, hubiere). Educated Dominicans never used the conditional in place of the imperfect subjunctive, as in Si yo habría visto 'If I had seen', nor did they ever use the imperfect subjunctive instead of the conditional, as in entonces yo hubiese dicho 'then I would have said'. Clitic object pronouns could often be placed after a finite verb, especially in narration, as in llega y vístese de prisa instead of the typical llega y se viste de prisa 'arrives and gets dressed quickly'.

Like in other Caribbean varieties of Spanish, explicit, redundant subject pronouns are frequent in Dominican Spanish. Pronominal uno 'one' may be frequently used, in cases where speakers of other varieties would use impersonal or reflexive se constructions. Personal subject pronouns can be used to refer to inanimate objects: Ella (la comunidad) es grande 'She (the community) is big'.

Dominican Spanish allows for "preverbal placement of subjects with interrogatives and with non-finite clauses". In more normative speech, the subject would typically go after the verb instead. Some examples are: ¿Qué ustedes quieren comer? 'What do you guys want to eat?' and Eso es para Odalis llevárselo a Lari 'That's for Odalis to take it to Lari'.

Other prominent aspects of Dominican Spanish include focalizing ser constructions, and clause-final negation and affirmation:

- Ustedes tenían que venir más temprano era 'You had to come earlier (it was)'
- El francés, yo no sé no si es fácil de aprender 'French, I don't know if it's easy to learn'
- Mamá sabía mucho sí 'Mom knew a lot indeed'

=== Rural El Cibao ===
In addition to these traits, the following has been found in rural speech in El Cibao, among people who are functionally illiterate, by Bullock & Toribio (2009):

- A change from -mos to -nos in the first-person plural (nosotros) endings with antepenultimate stress, as in the past subjunctive, imperfect, and conditional tenses, i.e.: nos bañábamos to nos bañábanos, nos bañáramos to nos bañáranos, nos bañaríamos to nos bañaríanos. This is likely due to the influence of the clitic nos, and analogy with standard forms such as llámanos 'call us'.
- Subjunctive forms used instead of the imperative, as in traigamos cinco quintales de producto 'we're bringing five hundredweights of product', or algo aquí que le digamos yagua 'something here that we call yagua'.
- Substitution of ha 'he/she/it has' for he 'I have', for example, yo le ha dado pela por eso 'I gave them a beating for that'.
- General archaic, nonstandard forms of common verbs: Puede que haigan haitianos para allá 'There could be Haitians over there', with haigan instead of haya, or yo quería dir 'I wanted to go' with dir instead of ir.
- As in many other dialects, impersonal hacer and haber may show third person plural agreement. What's more peculiar is that they may also be conjugated in other persons as well:
  - Hacían (< hacía) como tres meses que no llovía 'It's been three months since it last rained'
  - Habían (< había) algunos que sabían 'There were some who knew'
  - Yo hago (< hace) que tiempo que no voy para allá 'It's been some time since I've gone over there'
  - Habemos (< hay; < somos) pocas familias en Los Compos 'There are few of us families in Los Compos'
  - Haigamos (< hay; < somos) dos o tres 'There are two or three of us'
- Medio and demasiado, when modifying adjectives, often are inflected for gender, thus tengo la barriga media (< medio) mala 'I have a half-bad belly'.
- Fácil and difícil can be used as adverbs without the -mente suffix. Also, when used as adjectives, they don't always agree with plural subjects: se aprende fácil 'it's learned easily', son muy difícil (< difíciles) 'they're very difficult'.
- The plural forms of nouns ending in stressed vowels typically are formed with -se or -ses, instead of the standard -es: Yo no voy a los cabareses 'I don't go to the cabarets'. This is likely due to an analogy with words like feliz 'happy', lápiz 'pen', pronounced [feˈli] and [ˈlapi] in the singular but felices and lápices in the plural.
- Those same /s/-final words may receive a plural interpretation: esos son lapi (< lápices) 'those are pens'.
- Bien 'well' may be used as a predicate adjective, as in son bien 'they're good'.
- Saber and costar, typically meaning 'to know' and 'to cost', have acquired a modal meaning: Hasta 25 días sabía (< solía) durar 'It used to last up to 25 days', Me costará ir a la clínica 'I'll have to go to the clinic'.
- Cualquiera 'anyone' can be used in reference to a first person subject, as in cualquiera se va for me debo ir 'I must go'.

Likely related to the frequent use of subject pronouns, in the Cibao region ello 'it/there' may be used as a dummy pronoun with "impersonal and meteorological verbs, unaccusative predicates, impersonal passives, and other constructions in which transitives are used intransitively":

- Ello hay personas que lo aprenden bien (el inglés) 'There are people who learn it (English) well'
- Ello no está lloviendo aquí 'It's not raining here'
- Ello vienen haitianos aquí 'Haitians come here'
- Ello queda mucho tiempo todavía 'There's still a lot of time left'
- Porque si ello llega una gente de pa' fuera 'Because if some people from outside arrive'
- Ello vienen haitianos aquí 'Haitians come here'

It's been suggested that ello functions as a discourse marker.

Also, among rural Cibaeño speakers at least, experiencers tend to become the subject rather than the object of certain verbs such as gustar, hacer falta, and parecer:

- Yo me gustaría ser profesora, instead of A mí me gustaría ser profesora 'I'd like to be a teacher'
- Yo nunca me ha pasado nada de eso for A mí nunca me ha pasado nada de eso 'None of that's happened to me'
- Aunque yo me va a hacer falta for Aunque a mí me va a hacer falta 'Although I'll need that'
- Los zumbadores les gustan venir a esas flores for A los zumbadores les gusta venir a esas flores 'The hummingbirds like coming to these flowers'

Cibaeños often drop the a should occur before a definite animate direct object:

- Oyendo los haitianos 'Hearing Haitians'
- Para entender las personas de Francia 'To understand people from France'

They also use a unique pattern of cliticization:

- Vámoselo a tener que dar for Vamos a tener que dárselo 'We will have to give it to them'
- Vételo a sembrar for Vé a sembrarlo 'Go sow it'

== Vocabulary ==
=== Dominican vocabulary ===
As in every dialect, Dominican Spanish has numerous vocabulary differences from other forms of the language. The Dominican Academy of Letters (Academia Dominicana de la Lengua) published in November 2013 a dictionary of Dominican terms (Diccionario del español dominicano) containing close to 11,000 words and phrases peculiar to the Dominican dialect. Here are some examples:

Dominican Spanish	Standard Spanish	English
Dominican slang: tató (shortened from "está todo (bien)")	bien	good, fine
guapo/-a	agresivo/-a or enojado/-a (in Spain apuesto/-a )	brave, combative or angry, upset
chinola	maracuyá	passion fruit
lechoza	papaya	papaya / pawpaw
Cuarto (archaism occasionally used in standard Spanish also; literally means "quarters")	dinero	money
chin / chin chin (of Arawak origin)	un poco	a bit
guagua (also used in Cuba, Puerto Rico, Canary Islands)	autobús	coach / bus
motoconcho	mototaxi	motorbike taxi
pasola (a generic term derived from a trademark)	ciclomotor	scooter
yipeta (a generic term derived from a trademark)	(vehículo) todoterreno	jeep / SUV
conuco (Arawak origin), finca (finca is also commonly used in Central America)	granja	farm/agricultural field
colmado (this is an archaism seldom used in Spanish), and pulpería	tienda de ultramarinos	convenience store
zafacón (possibly a corrupted anglicism of safety can)	bote de basura	trash can
mata	planta	plant
conflé (possibly a corrupted anglicism of corn flakes)	cereal	cereal
Pamper (also used in Puerto Rico, Cuba, and Central America. It is believed to be a genericized term deriving from a trademark.)	pañal desechable	disposable diaper (Pampers)
Vaporu (a generic term derived from a trademark)	crema mentolada	ointment (Vicks VapoRub)

A slightly pejorative slang expression also common around most of the Caribbean basin is vaina. The Castilian meanings are "sheath", "pod", "shell", "shell casing", and "hull" (of a plant). It is descended from the Latin word "vāgīna", which meant "sheath". In the Dominican Republic "vaina" is mainly a thing, a matter, or simply "stuff". For example, ¿Qué vaina es esa? means ¿Qué cosa es esa?, "What is that thing/stuff?".

Anglicisms—due to cultural and commercial influence from the United States and the American occupations of the Dominican Republic during 1916–1924 and 1965–1966—are extremely common in Dominican Spanish, more so than in any other Spanish variant except for Puerto Rican and perhaps Northern Mexican Spanish. A prime example of this is "vaguada", which is a corruption of the English "bad weather", though in Dominican Spanish the term has come to mean storm or torrential downpour, rather than a spot of unpleasant climate. Hence, a common Dominican expression: "Viene una vaguada", "here comes a vaguada", or "here comes a storm". Another excellent example of this is "boche", a corruption of the English "bull shit", though in Dominican Spanish the term has come to mean a reprimanding, fulmination, or harangue in general terms. Hence, a common Dominican expression: "Me echaron un boche", "they threw me a boche", or "they reprimanded me". Furthermore, is the Dominican Spanish word for SUV, "yipeta", "jeepeta", or rarely "gipeta". This term is a corruption of the American "Jeep", which was the primary mode of transport for the GIs throughout the country during the occupation in the 1960s. Dominican license plates for SUVs are marked with a "G" for "gipeta", a variant of, and pronounced like, "yipeta", before their serial number. The word "tichel", from "T-shirt", also refers to a rugby shirt, association football jersey, or undershirt, and similarly, "corn flakes" and its variant "con fléi" can refer to any breakfast cereal, in Dominican Spanish, be it puffed corn, bran flakes, or puffed wheat. The borrowing "polo shirt" is frequently pronounced polo ché.

Another phenomenon related to Anglicisms is the usage of brand names as common names for certain objects. For example, "Gillette" and its derivative yilé refer to any razor, and while the machete is known as machete, this being originally a Spanish word, it is sometimes referred to as a "colín", derived from "Collins & Co.", name of a former Connecticut toolmaker. Another example is "mistolín", which may refer to any household use scented disinfectant indiscriminately, despite Mistolín being a registered trademark product.

=== Similarities in Spanish dialects ===
Below are different vocabulary words to demonstrate the similarities between the dialects of the Dominican Republic and other Caribbean countries, including Puerto Rico, Cuba, Colombia, Venezuela, and Panama. The dialects of Andalusia and the Canary Islands, two regions of Spain that have been highly influential on the dialects of these countries, are also included.

	Dominican Republic	Puerto Rico	Cuba	Spain (Canary Islands)	Spain (Andalusia)	Venezuela	Colombia	Panama
apartment	apartamento	apartamento	apartamento	piso	piso	apartamento	apartamento	apartamento
banana	guineo	guineo	plátano	plátano	plátano	cambur	banano	guineo
bean	habichuela	habichuela	frijol	judía	habichuela	caraota	frijol	frijol
car	carro	carro	carro	coche	coche	carro	carro	carro
cell phone	celular	celular	celular	móvil	móvil	celular	celular	celular
child (Note: In the Spanish-speaking world, niño is the standard word for child; all other words shown are slang or colloquial.)	niño/chico/ carajito	niño/nene/ chamaquito	niño/chico/ chiquito	niño/chico/crío/ chaval	niño/chico/crío/ chavea	niño/chico/ chamo	niño/chico/ pelao	niño/chico/chiquillo/ pelaíto
clothes hanger	percha	gancho	perchero	percha	percha	gancho	gancho	gancho
computer	computadora	computadora	computadora	ordenador	ordenador	computadora	computador	computadora
corn on the cob	mazorca	mazorca	mazorca	piña de millo	mazorca	jojoto	mazorca	mazorca
green bean	vainita	habichuela tierna	habichuela	habichuela	judía verde	vainita	habichuela	habichuela
money (Note: In the Spanish-speaking world, dinero is the standard word for money; all other words shown are slang or colloquial.)	dinero/cuarto	dinero/chavo	dinero/baro	dinero/pasta	dinero/pasta	dinero/plata	dinero/plata	dinero/plata
orange (Note: Refers to the fruit.)	naranja/china	china	naranja	naranja	naranja	naranja	naranja	naranja
papaya	lechosa	papaya/lechosa	fruta bomba	papaya	papaya	lechosa	papaya	papaya
peanut	maní	maní	maní	manis	cacahuete	maní	maní	maní
popcorn	palomitas de maíz	popcorn	rositas de maíz	palomitas	palomitas	cotufas	crispetas/ maíz pira	popcorn
postage stamp	sello	sello	sello	sello	sello	estampilla	estampilla	estampilla
potato	papa	papa	papa	papa	papa	papa	papa	papa
sock	media	media	media	calcetín	calcetín	media	media	media
soft drink	refresco	refresco	refresco	refresco	refresco	refresco	gaseosa	soda
sweet potato	batata	batata	boniato	batata	batata	batata	batata	camote
transit bus	guagua	guagua	guagua	guagua	autobús	autobús	autobús	bus
watermelon	sandía	melón de agua	melón de agua	sandía	sandía	patilla	sandía	sandía

== Some words and names borrowed from Arawakan ==
Arawak	Translation
ají	chili/hot pepper
Anacaona	golden flower
arepa	corn cake
bara	whip
barbacoa	barbecue ("barbecue" is a borrowing derived from barbacoa). A four-legged stand made of sticks, used by the Taínos for roasting meat.
batata	sweet potato
bohío	small square house (typical countryside homes)
cacata	Hispaniolan giant tarantula
ceiba	silkcotton tree
canoa	small boat, canoe (canoe is a borrowing derived from canoa)
Cibao	rocky land
cocuyo or cucuyo	small click beetle with a blueish light
cohiba	tobacco/tobacco leaves
guayo	grater
jaiba	river crab (specifically Epilobocera haytensis) or freshwater crayfish
jicotea	aquatic turtle (most likely Trachemys decorata)
maraca	gourd rattle, musical instrument made of higuera gourd
maco	toad, bullfrog
mime	little insect, typically a fruit fly
sabana	savanna, treeless plain
tabaco	tobacco
yagua	a small palm native to Hispaniola
