= Phonological history of Spanish coronal fricatives =

Phonemic distinction between /θ/ and /s/ historically and today

In Spanish dialectology, the realization of coronal fricatives is one of the most prominent features distinguishing various dialect regions. The main three realizations are the phonemic distinction between /θ/ and /s/ (distinción), the presence of only alveolar [s] (seseo), or, less commonly, the presence of only a denti-alveolar [s̟] that is similar to /θ/ (ceceo).

While an urban legend attributes the presence of the dental fricative to a Spanish king with a lisp, the various realizations of these coronal fricatives are actually a result of historical processes that date to the 15th century.

== Origins ==
=== Castilian 'lisp' ===
A persistent urban legend claims that the prevalence of the sound /θ/ in Spanish can be traced to a Spanish king who spoke with a lisp, whose pronunciation spread via prestige borrowing to the rest of the population. This myth has been discredited by scholars. Lundeberg (1947) traces the origins of the legend to a chronicle of Pero López de Ayala which says that Peter of Castile "lisped a little" ("ceceaba un poco"). However, Peter reigned in the 14th century and the sound /θ/ began to develop in the 16th century (see below). Moreover, a true lisp would not give rise to the systematic distinction between /s/ and /θ/ that characterizes standard Peninsular pronunciation. For example, a lisp would lead one to pronounce siento ('I feel') and ciento ('hundred') the same (as [ˈθjento]) whereas in standard Peninsular Spanish they are pronounced [ˈsjento] and [ˈθjento] respectively.

The misnomer "Castilian lisp" is used occasionally to refer to the presence of [θ] in Peninsular pronunciation (in both distinción and ceceo varieties).

=== Historical evolution ===
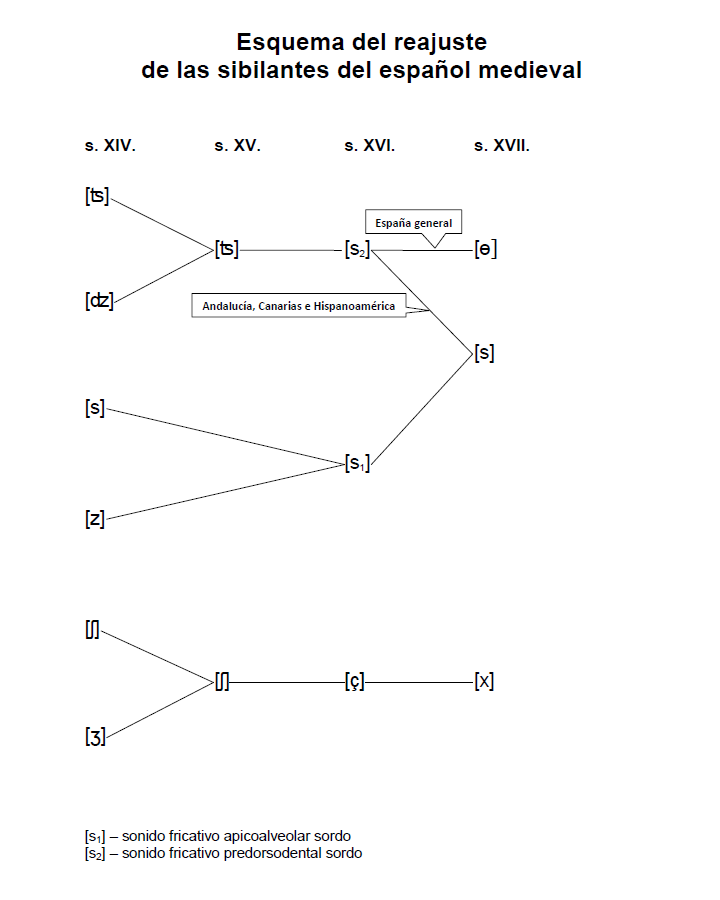
Historical development of the Spanish sibilants. Text is in Spanish; Roman numerals represent centuries AD.

In the 15th century, Spanish had developed a large number of sibilant phonemes: seven by some accounts, eight by others (depending on whether /d͡ʒ/ and /ʒ/ are considered contrasting), more than any current dialect. During the 16th and early 17th centuries these phonemes merged differently as they evolved into those of the different modern dialects. There were four pairs of voiceless versus voiced sibilants: dental/alveolar affricates /t͡s/ vs. /d͡z/ (spelled ⟨c⟩ or ⟨ç⟩ vs. ⟨z⟩); dental/alveolar fricatives /s/ (spelled ⟨ss⟩ when intervocalic, ⟨s⟩ otherwise) vs. /z/ (intervocalic only, spelled ⟨s⟩); postalveolar affricates /t͡ʃ/ (spelled ⟨ch⟩) vs. /d͡ʒ/; and postalveolar fricatives /ʃ/ (spelled ⟨x⟩) vs. /ʒ/. Both /d͡ʒ/ and /ʒ/ were spelled ⟨g⟩ before ⟨e⟩ or ⟨i⟩, and ⟨j⟩ elsewhere. It is likely that /d͡ʒ/ deaffricated and merged with /ʒ/ before the year 1500. The main difference between the prestige dialect of north central Spain and dialects to the south (such as Andalusian Spanish) was that, in the north, the dental/alveolar continuants were more retracted than the affricates (the former pair can be represented as /s̺/ and /z̺/ and the latter as /t͡s̪/ and /d͡z̪/), keeping their phonemic distinction, while in the south they were homorganic. The first step away from that system was the deaffrication of /d͡z̪/ in the first quarter of the 16th century. Because of a differing place of articulation, this still contrasted with /z̺/ in the prestige dialect of north central Spain, though it was a complete merger for southern dialects.

| | | Pronunciation | Orthography |
|---|---|---|---|
| voiced affricate → fricative | postalveolar | /dʒ/ → /ʒ/ | ⟨g⟩ before ⟨e⟩, ⟨i⟩; ⟨j⟩ elsewhere |
| voiceless fricative | postalveolar | /ʃ/ | ⟨x⟩ |
| voiceless affricate | postalveolar | /t͡ʃ/ | ⟨ch⟩ |
| voiced fricative | apicoalveolar | /z̺/ | intervocalic ⟨s⟩ |
| voiceless fricative | apicoalveolar | /s̺/ | ⟨s⟩ in syllable onset or coda; ⟨ss⟩ between vowels |
| voiced affricate → fricative | coronal | /d͡z̪/ → /z̪/ | ⟨z⟩ |
| voiceless affricate | coronal | /t͡s̪/ | ⟨c⟩ before ⟨e⟩, ⟨i⟩; ⟨ç⟩ before ⟨a⟩, ⟨o⟩, ⟨u⟩ |

The second step was the devoicing of voiced sibilants. In the north, /z̺/ and /ʒ/ were lost, but /z̪/ remained contrastive with its new pronunciation /s̪/, because there had been no voiceless /s̪/ previously. This sound contrasted with two acoustically similar sounds: dentoalveolar /t͡s̪/ and apicoalveolar /s̺/. By 1600, /t͡s̪/, too, had deaffricated and merged with the earlier /s̪/ that had already developed from /z̪/. Subsequent changes to the sound system of Spanish retained the contrasts while enhancing the segments by increasing articulatory distance amongst their rather subtle acoustic contrasts, an appropriate step due to the high productivity of these phonemes in differentiating frequently used minimal pairs. The dentoalveolar one was moved "forward" to interdental /θ̟/, losing its former sibilance in the process (which increased its acoustic distance to the remaining sibilant ⟨s⟩), and the prepalatal one was moved "backward" to velar /x/, also losing its former sibilance, all in all resulting in the three-way distinction of modern Standard Peninsular pronunciation:

| Original 6-way contrast | Deaffrication 1 | Devoicing | Deaffrication 2 | Modern distinción | Orthography |
|---|---|---|---|---|---|
| /d͡z̪/ – /t͡s̪/ | /z̪/ – /t͡s̪/ | /s̪/ – /t͡s̪/ | /s̪/ | [θ̟] | ⟨z⟩ or ⟨c⟩ (before ⟨e⟩, ⟨i⟩) |
| /z̺/ – /s̺/ | | /s̺/ | | [s̺] | ⟨s⟩ |
| /ʒ/ – /ʃ/ | | /ʃ/ | | [x] | ⟨j⟩ or ⟨g⟩ (before ⟨e⟩, ⟨i⟩) |

In the south, the devoicing process and deaffrication of /t͡s/ gave rise to new fricatives that were indistinguishable from the existing ones. The process of increasing articulatory distance still applied, however, and /ʃ/ retracted to /x/ in the south just as it did in the north. In a number of ceceo areas (particularly the southernmost provinces like Cádiz) /s/ developed into a non-sibilant apico-dental [θ̺], perceptually similar to the interdental /θ̟/ used by Standard Peninsular speakers for orthographic ⟨c⟩/⟨z⟩. In seseo areas (particularly in the westernmost provinces like Seville and Huelva), the resulting phoneme developed a predorsal alveolar realization [s̻] (like English ⟨s⟩), perceptually similar to the apicoalveolar [s̺] used by Standard Peninsular speakers for orthographic ⟨s⟩. This seseo variety was the pronunciation that most impacted Latin America, as many emigrants to the Americas were from Andalusian and Canarian ports. In addition, several generations of Spanish speakers had lived and grown in the Americas before /θ/ appeared in Castilian.

| Original 6-way contrast | Deaffrication 1 | Devoicing | Deaffrication 2 | Modern seseo | Modern ceceo | Orthography |
|---|---|---|---|---|---|---|
| /d͡z/ – /t͡s/ | /z/ – /s/ + /ts/ | /s/ – /ts/ | /s/ | [s̻] | [θ̺] | ⟨z⟩, ⟨c⟩ (before ⟨e⟩, ⟨i⟩), ⟨s⟩ |
| /z/ – /s/ | /z/ – /s/ + /ts/ | /s/ – /ts/ | /s/ | [s̻] | [θ̺] | ⟨z⟩, ⟨c⟩ (before ⟨e⟩, ⟨i⟩), ⟨s⟩ |
| /ʒ/ – /ʃ/ | | /ʃ/ | | [x] | | ⟨j⟩ or ⟨g⟩ (before ⟨e⟩, ⟨i⟩) |

The development of the sibilants in Ladino (which split off from Castilian and other Peninsular varieties in the 15th century) was more conservative, resulting in a system closer to that of Portuguese.

=== Modern changes ===
Many modern dialects debuccalize the /s/ to [h], some further undergo deletion and compensatory lengthening of nearby vowel or consonant.

== Distinction ==
Distinction (Spanish: distinción) refers to the differentiated pronunciation of the two Spanish phonemes written ⟨s⟩ and ⟨z⟩ or ⟨c⟩ (only before ⟨e⟩ or ⟨i⟩, the so-called "soft" ⟨c⟩):

1. ⟨s⟩ represents a voiceless alveolar sibilant /s/ (either laminal as in English, or apical);
2. ⟨z⟩ and soft ⟨c⟩ represent a voiceless dental fricative /θ/ (the ⟨th⟩ in think).

By the early 1700s the six sibilant phonemes of medieval Spanish had all merged into three phonemes in the dialects with this distinction and two phonemes elsewhere, but spelling still reflected the older pronunciation system. From 1726 to 1815 the RAE reformed spelling, resulting in a modern Spanish orthography which reflects the system with distinction. This distinction is universal in Central and Northern parts of Spain, except for some bilingual speakers of Catalan and Basque, according to Hualde (2005), as well as some bilingual speakers of Galician whose dialect has this trait (but not all).

In most of Spain, this distinction is between an apical [s̠] and a dental [θ]. That said, in most regions of Andalusia which distinguish /s/ and /θ/, the distinction involves a laminal [s]. According to Penny (2000), the distinction between a laminal /s/ and /θ/ is native to most of Almería, eastern Granada, most of Jaén, and northern Huelva, while the distinction between an apical /s/ and /θ/, as found in the rest of Peninsular Spanish, is native to the very northeastern regions of Almería, Granada and Jaén, to northern Córdoba, not including the provincial capital, and to a small region of northern Huelva.

== Lack of distinction ==
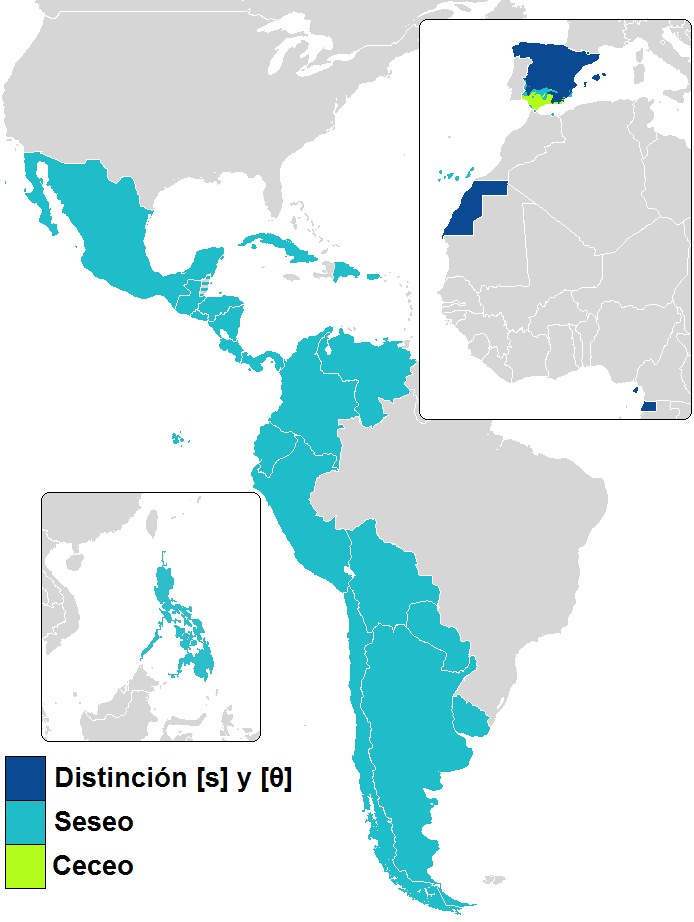
Most Peninsular Spanish dialects have [s]/[θ] contrast (distinción), while such contrast is absent in Latin America, the Philippines, the Canary Islands, and some parts of southern Spain (seseo/ceceo).

In most Spanish-speaking regions and countries the phonemic distinction between /s/ and /θ/ does not exist. These varieties of Spanish are sometimes said to exhibit neutralización ('neutralization') as opposed to distinción.

=== Seseo ===
Seseo [seˈseo] is a lack of distinction between /s/ and /θ/ with both being realized as [s]. For example, the words casa ('house') and caza ('hunt') would be pronounced with the same [s] sound. This can result in ambiguity but can usually be interpreted depending on the context in which the sentence is spoken. Seseo is the most widespread pronunciation among Spanish speakers worldwide and occurs in nearly all speakers in Hispanic America. While it is a minority pronunciation in Spain itself, seseo is considered standard in all varieties of Latin American Spanish, as well as in the Philippines. It coexists with distinción and ceceo in parts of Spain (e.g. in the Canary Islands, much of Andalusia, historically in southern Murcia, western Badajoz, and the western coast of Galicia). Traditional dialect atlases (e.g., Alvar (1991)) show one variant or another used in adjacent regions. In Spain, seseo is considered "more socially acceptable or perhaps 'less substandard' than ceceo".

=== Ceceo ===
Ceceo [θeˈθeo] (sometimes transcribed in English sources according to pronunciation as thetheo) is a phenomenon found in a few dialects of southern Spain in which /s/ and /θ/ are not distinguished and there is only one coronal fricative phoneme realized as the voiceless denti-alveolar sibilant [s̟], a sibilant sounding somewhat like [θ], but not identical. Ceceo is found primarily in some varieties of Andalusian Spanish, and historically in two villages of southeastern Murcia. That said, Hualde reports that there is some evidence of the phenomenon in parts of Central America. A publication of the University of Oviedo also notes that ceceo can be found in Argentina and Chile. Other linguists have noticed the use of ceceo in parts of Puerto Rico, Honduras, and Venezuela. A similar sound characterized as a "voiceless apico-or corono-post-dental slit fricative" has been observed in Nicaragua, El Salvador, Honduras, Colombia, Puerto Rico, and Venezuela; In these places, ceceo is a largely rural pronunciation and is often stigmatized.

In El Salvador, some speakers use a [θ]-like fricative in the syllable instead of the usual glottal [h], [s], or phonetic zero, rendering todos 'all' (plural) as [ˈtoðoθ], more usually pronounced [ˈtoðoh] or [ˈtoðo] (the latter homophonous with todo 'all' (singular)). Salvadoran Spanish occasionally weakens, but almost never completely deletes, /s/ in onset positions, and this [sᶿ] allophone is more common in onset positions than coda ones. According to Brogan 2018, this is the result of a gestural undershoot. It is on an acoustic continuum between [s] and [h], representing an intermediate degree of lenition. Brogan 2018 identifies this with the ceceo of Andalusian and other dialects. The following table gives an example of the three pronunciation patterns discussed so far:

| | La casa ('the house') | La caza ('the hunt') |
|---|---|---|
| Distinción | /la ˈkasa/ | /la ˈkaθa/ |
| Seseo | /la ˈkasa/ | |
| Ceceo | /la ˈkas̟a/ | |

=== Ceseo or seceo ===
Many speakers of ceceo and seseo dialects in Spain show sociolinguistic variation in usage. In some cases, this variation may arise when a ceceo or seseo speaker more or less consciously attempts to use distinción in response to sociolinguistic pressure (hypercorrection). However, as, for instance, in the case of the variation between the standard velar nasal and alveolar pronunciation of the nasal in -ing in English (walking versus walkin'), the switching may be entirely unconscious. It is perhaps evidence of the saliency of three-way ceceo-seseo-distinción variation that inconsistent use has elicited evaluative comments by some traditional Spanish dialectologists. For instance, Dalbor (1980) discussed it as "sporadic or chaotic switching [between [s] and [θ]] and the use of intermediate sounds impossible to determine with precision". Obaid (1973) proposes the synonymous terms ceseo [θeˈseo] and seceo [seˈθeo] to refer to these "mixed" patterns, and notes surprise at a speaker who produced all four possible pronunciations of Zaragoza ([θaɾaˈɣoθa], [saɾaˈɣosa], [θaɾaˈɣosa] and [saɾaˈɣoθa]) within the space of a few minutes. In fact, sociolinguistic variation is typically highly structured in terms of how often each variant will appear given various social and linguistic independent variables. The Spanish spoken by the inhabitants of the Canary Islands is exclusively seseante, but exclusive seseo is quite rare in mainland Spain – even in areas, such as Seville, listed as being majority seseante.

== See also ==
- History of the Spanish language
- Spanish dialects and varieties
- Spanish phonology
- Yeísmo
- Rhoticity in English

== Sources ==
- Alvar, Manuel (1991). Atlas lingüístico y etnográfico de Andalucía. Madrid: Arco Libros. ISBN 9788476351062.
- Alvarez Menéndez, Alfredo Ignacio (2005). Hablar en español: la cortesía verbal, la pronunciación estandar del español, las formas de expresión oral. Universidad de Oviedo. ISBN 3896577719.
- Alonso, Amado (1951). "Historia del ceceo y del seseo españoles" (PDF). Centro Virtual Cervantes.
- Brogan, Franny D. (2018). Sociophonetically-based phonology: An Optimality Theoretic account of /s/ lenition in Salvadoran Spanish (PhD). University of California, Los Angeles.
- Brogan, Franny D.; Bolyanatz, Mariška A. (July 2018). "A sociophonetic account of onset /s/ weakening in Salvadoran Spanish: Instrumental and segmental analyses". Language Variation and Change. 30 (2): 203–230. doi:10.1017/S0954394518000066. S2CID 149803757.
- Dalbor, John B. (1980). "Observations on Present-Day Seseo and Ceceo in Southern Spain". Hispania. 63 (1). American Association of Teachers of Spanish and Portuguese: 5–19. doi:10.2307/340806. JSTOR 340806.
- Fernández López, Justo (1999–2007), Ceceo y seseo – Origen y evolución histórica (PDF) (in Spanish), Hispanoteca, Institut für Romanistik, Universität Innsbruck., archived from the original (PDF) on 2018-06-17
- Harris, James (1969). Spanish Phonology. Cambridge: MIT Press.
- Herranz H., Atanasio (1990). "El español de Honduras a través de su bibliografía". Nueva Revista de Filología Hispánica. 38 (1): 15–61. doi:10.24201/nrfh.v38i1.773. ISSN 0185-0121. JSTOR 40298986.
- Hualde, Jose Ignacio (2005). The Sounds of Spanish. Cambridge, UK/NY: Cambridge University Press. ISBN 0-521-54538-2.
- Lapesa, Rafael (1969). "Sobre el Ceceo y el Seseo en Hispanoamérica". Revista Iberoamericana. 21 (41): 409–416. doi:10.5195/reviberoamer.1956.1679.
- Lundeberg, Olav K. (1947), "What Is Ceceo? Inquiry and Proposal", Hispania, 30 (3), American Association of Teachers of Spanish and Portuguese: 368–373, doi:10.2307/333415, JSTOR 333415
- Navarro Tomás, Tomás; Espinosa, Aurelio Macedonio Jr.; Rodríguez-Castellano, L. (1933). "La frontera del andaluz" (PDF). Revista de Filología Española (in Spanish). XX (3): 225–277.
- Obaid, Antonio H. (1973). "The Vagaries of the Spanish 'S'". Hispania. 56 (1). American Association of Teachers of Spanish and Portuguese: 60–67. doi:10.2307/339038. JSTOR 339038.
- Penny, Ralph J. (2000). Variation and change in Spanish. Cambridge: Cambridge University Press. ISBN 9780521780452.
- Penny, Ralph (2002). A History of the Spanish Language (2nd ed.). Cambridge: Cambridge University Press. ISBN 978-0-521-01184-6.
