= List of countries and territories where Spanish is an official language =

Official majority language Co-official or administrative language but not majority native language Secondary language (more than 20% Spanish speakers) or culturally important

The following is a list of countries where Spanish is an official language, plus several countries where Spanish or any language closely related to it is an important or significant language.

There are 20 UN member states where Spanish is an official language (de jure and de facto).

== Official or national language ==
Ñ-shaped animation showing flags of some countries and territories where Spanish is spoken

Spanish is the official language (either by law or de facto) in 21 sovereign states (including Antigua and Barbuda, where it is an "official second language"), one dependent territory (Puerto Rico), and one partially recognized state (Sahrawi Arab Democratic Republic), totaling around 442 million people.

=== Primary or only official language ===
In these countries and territories, Spanish serves as the predominant language of communication for the vast majority of the population. Official documents are primarily or exclusively composed in this language, and it is systematically taught in educational institutions, functioning as the principal medium of instruction within the official curriculum.

==== Sovereign states ====
Sovereign state	Status	Population (2021)	Regulatory body	More information
Mexico	De facto	130,207,371	Academia Mexicana de la Lengua	Mexican Spanish
Colombia	De jure	52,695,952	Academia Colombiana de la Lengua	Colombian Spanish
Spain (Note: In Spain, Spanish is the sole official language at the national level, while Basque, Catalan/Valencian, Aranese, and Galician are co-official alongside Spanish in certain regions.)	De jure	48,797,875	Real Academia Española	Peninsular Spanish, Canarian Spanish
Argentina	De facto	45,864,941	Academia Argentina de Letras	Rioplatense Spanish
Peru (Note: In Peru, Spanish is the sole official language at the national level, while Quechua and Aymara hold co-official status in selected regions.)	De jure	32,201,224	Academia Peruana de la Lengua	Peruvian Spanish
Venezuela	De jure	29,069,159	Academia Venezolana de la Lengua	Venezuelan Spanish
Chile	De facto	18,307,925	Academia Chilena de la Lengua	Chilean Spanish
Guatemala	De jure	17,422,821	Academia Guatemalteca de la Lengua	Guatemalan Spanish
Ecuador (Note: In Ecuador, Spanish is the sole official language at the national level, while the Kichwa (Northern Quechua) and Shuar languages hold co-official status in selected regions.)	De jure	17,093,159	Academia Ecuatoriana de la Lengua	Ecuadorian Spanish
Bolivia (Note: In Bolivia, the national constitution recognizes Spanish and various indigenous languages of Bolivia as official at the national level, though Spanish is predominant nationwide.)	De jure	11,758,869	Academia Boliviana de la Lengua	Bolivian Spanish
Cuba	De jure	11,032,343	Academia Cubana de la Lengua	Cuban Spanish
Dominican Republic	De jure	10,597,348	Academia Dominicana de la Lengua	Dominican Spanish
Honduras	De jure	9,346,277	Academia Hondureña de la Lengua	Honduran Spanish
Paraguay (Note: In Paraguay, Spanish and the indigenous Guaraní are recognized as co-official at the national level, and both are widely used in society.)	De jure	7,272,639	Academia Paraguaya de la Lengua Española	Paraguayan Spanish
El Salvador	De jure	6,528,135	Academia Salvadoreña de la Lengua	Salvadoran Spanish
Nicaragua	De jure	6,243,931	Academia Nicaragüense de la Lengua	Nicaraguan Spanish
Costa Rica	De jure	5,151,140	Academia Costarricense de la Lengua	Costa Rican Spanish
Panama	De jure	3,928,646	Academia Panameña de la Lengua	Panamanian Spanish
Uruguay	De facto	3,398,239	Academia Nacional de Letras	Uruguayan Spanish
Equatorial Guinea (Note: In Equatorial Guinea, the Spanish, French, and Portuguese languages all hold official status at the national level, though Spanish is the primary language in the public sphere, while Fang, Bube, Kombe, and other Bantu languages, as well as an English-based creole, are used at home and in family settings.)	De jure	1,468,777	Academia Ecuatoguineana de la Lengua Española	Equatoguinean Spanish
Total 20 countries		464,509,172	Association of Academies of the Spanish Language	

==== Territory ====
Territory	Status	Population (2021)	Regulatory body	More information
Puerto Rico (Note: Puerto Rico is an unincorporated territory of the U.S. where Spanish and English are the official languages and Spanish is the primary language.)	De jure	3,142,779	Academia Puertorriqueña de la Lengua Española	Puerto Rican Spanish

=== Secondary official language ===
==== Sovereign state ====
State	Status	More information
Antigua and Barbuda	De jure (Note: In Antigua and Barbuda, Spanish was designated as an "official second language" by Cabinet directive on 14 May 2026. The presumed primary language, English, has only de facto official status in the country, thus making Spanish the sole official language de jure. Neither the Constitution nor an Act of Parliament have confirmed either Spanish or English as official, although the Constitution does grant English some special status.)	Spanish language in Antigua and Barbuda

==== Partially recognized state ====
Spanish is a secondary language, co-official with Arabic as the primary language.

State	Status	More information
Sahrawi Arab Democratic Republic (Note: The Sahrawi Arab Democratic Republic is a partially recognized state, recognized by 46 UN member states, which claims the non-self-governing territory of Western Sahara.)	De facto	Saharan Spanish

=== Secondary de facto language ===
Spanish is a secondary de facto language, alongside English.

==== Officially recognized U.S. state ====
State	Status	More information
New Mexico (Note: The State of New Mexico is an official state of the U.S. where Spanish and English are the majority de facto languages and English is the primary language. The Constitution of New Mexico does not establish Spanish as an official language. However, Spanish is the state's major secondary language after English Plus was passed in 1989.)	De facto	New Mexican Spanish

== Significant language ==
Though not an official language at the national level, Spanish is regularly spoken by significant populations throughout these countries. Public services, education, and information are widely available in Spanish, as are various forms of printed and broadcast media.

Territory	Population (2022)	Total speakers	Percentage Spanish-speaking
Andorra	85,468	~40,000	48.6%
Belize	419,137	199,393	54.0%
Gibraltar	34,003	25,500	75%
Suriname			
United States	339,665,118	~45,000,000	14%

=== Andorra ===
Spanish is not the official language of Andorra but holds a special status in some fields, namely in education and business. Public education in Spanish (following the Spanish public education system) is offered in the country. It is the second-most spoken language in the country, with nearly half of the population conversant in Spanish, rivaling the official Catalan in both native and total speaker numbers. Spanish has also emerged as the lingua franca between various linguistic groups and in the commercial sector, which has triggered government efforts to promote the more general and universal use of Catalan. In 2008, 30.8% of students were enrolled in the Spanish education system.

=== Belize ===
Spanish has no official recognition in the Central American nation of Belize, a Commonwealth of Nations member state where English is the official national language. However, the country shares land borders with Spanish-speaking Mexico and Guatemala and per the 2022 Belizean census, Spanish is spoken by a sizable portion of the population; 54% of the population has a working knowledge of the language.

=== Gibraltar ===
Spanish is not official in the British Overseas Territory of Gibraltar, which shares its only land border with Spain. Nevertheless, Spanish is compulsory for secondary school students and a mixture of Spanish and English called Llanito is colloquially spoken among most inhabitants. Recent trends since the 2000s have found, however, that Spanish proficiency and usage among younger generations is declining as members of these groups tend to use English exclusively.

=== United States ===
Percentage of the U.S. population aged 5 and over that speaks Spanish at home in 2019, by US States.

Spanish has been spoken in the United States for several centuries in the Southwest and Florida, which were all once part of New Spain. However, today only a minority of Spanish speakers in the U.S. trace their language back to those times; the overwhelming majority of speakers come from recent immigration. Only in northern New Mexico and southern Colorado there have been Spanish-speaking communities uninterruptedly since colonial times.

Spanish is the most studied foreign language in United States schools and is spoken as a native tongue by 41 million people, plus an additional 11 million fluent second-language speakers. Though not official, Spanish has a special status in the American state of New Mexico. With almost 60 million native speakers and second language speakers, the United States now has the second-largest Spanish-speaking population in the world after Mexico. Spanish is increasingly used alongside English nationwide in business and politics. Media in Spanish has also become influential outside of native Hispanophone circles. In the United States, correct use of the language is advocated by the North American Academy of the Spanish Language.

== Officially recognized status ==
=== Philippines ===
Spanish was the official language of the Philippines from the beginning of the Hispanic period in 1565 and through independence until a constitutional change in 1973. However, President Ferdinand Marcos had Spanish redesignated as an official language under Presidential Decree No. 156, dated 15 March 1973 and Spanish remained official until 1987, when it was re-designated as a voluntary and optional auxiliary language. Additionally, the present Philippine Constitution, in its Article XIV, stipulates that the Government shall provide the people of the Philippines with a Spanish-language translation of the Constitution. Beyond the Constitution, the Philippine Department of Education issued DECS Order No. 33 in 1987, requiring schools to include Spanish and Arabic when offering foreign language courses, pointing out the relevance of both languages "in the development of Philippine history and culture".

On 8 August 2007, President Gloria Macapagal Arroyo announced that the Philippine government asked for help from the Spanish Government in her plan to reintroduce Spanish as a required subject in the Philippine school system. By 2012, the language was a compulsory subject at only a very select number of secondary schools. Since then, the language is only offered as an elective course for high school students. As of 2020, only about 400,000 people, which accounts for under 0.5% of the population, can speak Spanish at least proficiently.

While Spanish is designated as an optional government language in the Philippines, its usage is very limited and not present in everyday life. Despite this, Tagalog and other native Philippine languages incorporate a large number of Spanish loanwords, as a result of 300 years of Spanish influence. In the country, use of correct Spanish is promoted by the Philippine Academy of the Spanish Language.

== Other legal status ==
=== Western Sahara ===
Spanish is an official language, alongside Arabic, of the Sahrawi Arab Democratic Republic, a partially recognized state that claims Western Sahara. The territory, a former Spanish colony now mostly occupied by Morocco, is regarded as a non-self-governing territory by the United Nations. Although Spanish is not commonly spoken as a native language in Western Sahara, it is widely used as a secondary language in the region's SADR-controlled area, while the Moroccan government uses Arabic and French in administrating the Moroccan-occupied area.

== Creole languages ==
There are several Spanish-based creole languages. Chavacano is spoken in Zamboanga City in the Philippines and is a regional language. Papiamento is the official language in Aruba, Bonaire, and Curaçao; it has been classified as either a Spanish-based or a Portuguese-based creole.

Chamorro is an Austronesian language with many Spanish loanwords; some scholars have considered it a creole, but the most authoritative sources deny this.

Country	Creole language	Estimated speakers	Year	Status
Aruba	Papiamento	~100,000	—N/a	Official
Caribbean Netherlands	Papiamento	–	–	Official
Curaçao	Papiamento	185,155	1981	Official
Philippines	Chavacano	689,000	1992	Regional

== Judeo-Spanish ==
Judeo-Spanish (sometimes known as Judezmo, Ladino or other names) is a language derived from medieval Spanish; it is still spoken by some Sephardi Jews, mainly in Israel.

== International organizations ==
- United Nations (UN)
- European Union (EU)
- Union of South American Nations (UNASUR)
- African Union (AU)
- Central American Integration System (SICA)
- Latin American Parliament (Parlatino)
- United Nations Economic Commission for Latin America and the Caribbean (ECLAC)
- Organization of American States (OAS)
- Organization for Security and Co-operation in Europe (OSCE)
- Organization of Ibero-American States (OEI)
- World Trade Organization (WTO)
- North American Free Trade Agreement (NAFTA)
- Mercosur
- Andean Community of Nations (CAN)
- Caribbean Community (CARICOM)
- Latin American Integration Association (ALADI)
- Antarctic Treaty Secretariat (ATS)
- International Labour Organization (ILO)
- Food and Agriculture Organization (FAO)
- International Telecommunication Union (ITU)
- Latin Union
- Pacific Alliance
- Interpol
- Fédération Internationale de Football Association (FIFA)
- Inter-American Development Bank
- World Tourism Organization (UNWTO)

== See also ==
- Hispanophone
- Geographical distribution of Spanish speakers
- Spanish-based creole languages

By ISO 639-3 code
Enter an ISO code to find the corresponding language article.
