= Belebú Balachá =

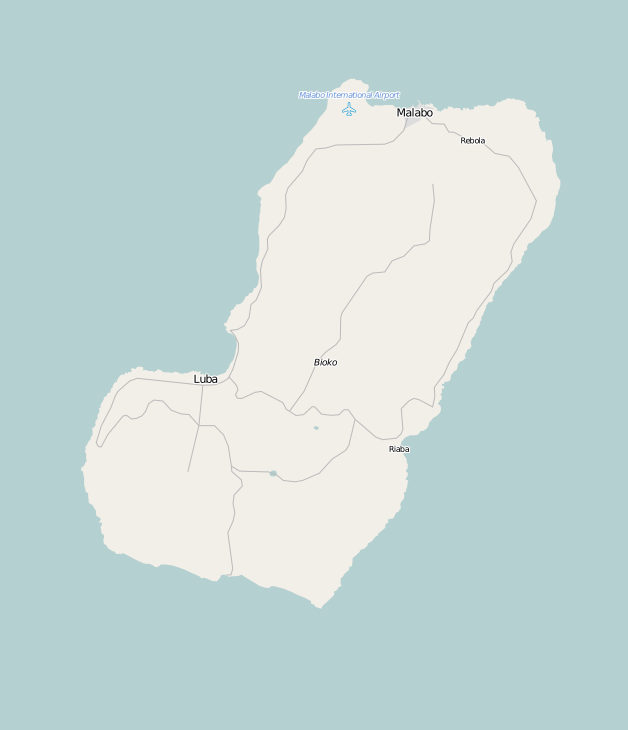
- Location within Bioko Location within Equatorial Guinea
- Coordinates: 3.40212°N 8.57411°E
- Country: Equatorial Guinea
- Province: Bioko Sur

Belebú Balachá is a community on Bioko island in Equatorial Guinea. It is south of Luba, the second-largest town on the island, and just north of the Luba Crater Scientific Reserve. As of 2010 a new highway was under construction through the reserve from Belebu to Ureca but it cannot be confirmed if the highway was built.
