= Equatoguinean Portuguese =

Variety of Portuguese language

- português da Guiné Equatorial português equato-guineense
- Pronunciation: [puɾ.tu.ˈgeʒ gi.nɨ.ˈẽ.sɨ]
- Native speakers: 20,000+ total speakers. (2024)
- Language family: Indo-European: Italic; Latino-Faliscan; Latin; Romance; Western Romance; Ibero-Romance; West-Iberian; Galician-Portuguese; Portuguese; Equatoguinean Portuguese

Official status
- Official language in: Equatorial Guinea
- Recognised minority language in: Gabon
- Regulated by: International Portuguese Language Institute

Language codes
- ISO 639-3: –
- IETF: pt-GQ

Equatoguinean Portuguese (Portuguese: português equato-guineense) is the variety of Portuguese spoken in Equatorial Guinea. It is regulated by International Portuguese Language Institute and is spoken by around 1% of the population, estimated at 20,000 for the year 2024 (though population figures for this country are highly dubious).

The Portuguese language, along with Spanish and French is one of three official languages of the African nation. making it one of six African countries to have Portuguese as an official language and the most recent one to do as such.

== History ==
=== Portuguese colony ===
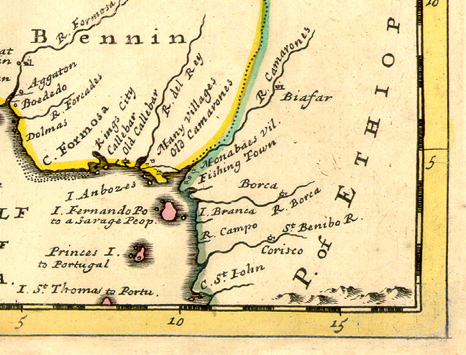
1729 map showing the area of the Gulf of Guinea where the Bubi, Fang and Benga cultures, among others, developed.

Portuguese navigators were the first Europeans to explore the Gulf of Guinea in 1471. Fernão do Pó located the island of Bioko on European maps that year, looking for a route to India, which he named Formosa (however, it was initially known by the name of its discoverer).

In 1493, Dom João II of Portugal proclaimed himself, along with the rest of his royal titles, as Lord of Guinea and the first Lord of Corisco. The Portuguese colonized the islands of Bioko, Annobón and Corisco in 1494, and converted them into slave trading posts.

In 1641, the Dutch East India Company established itself without Portuguese consent on the island of Bioko, temporarily centralizing the slave trade in the Gulf of Guinea there, until the Portuguese returned to make their presence felt on the island in 1648, replacing the Dutch Company with their own Corisco Company dedicated to the same trade, building one of the first European buildings on the island, the Ponta Joko fort.

Portugal sold slave labor from Corisco under special contracts to France, which hired up to 49,000 equatoguinean slaves, to Spain and England in 1713 and 1753, the main collaborators in this trade being the Bengas, who had good relations with the European colonial authorities (who in turn did not intervene in the country's internal politics, which undoubtedly helped), and who also had their own slave economic system, with their private servants generally being the Pamues and the Nvikos.

The islands remained in Portuguese hands until March 1778, after the treaties of San Ildefonso (1777) and Pardo (1778), by which the islands were ceded to Spain, along with free trade rights in a sector of the coast of the Gulf of Guinea between the Niger and Ogooué rivers, in exchange for the disputed Colonia del Sacramento.

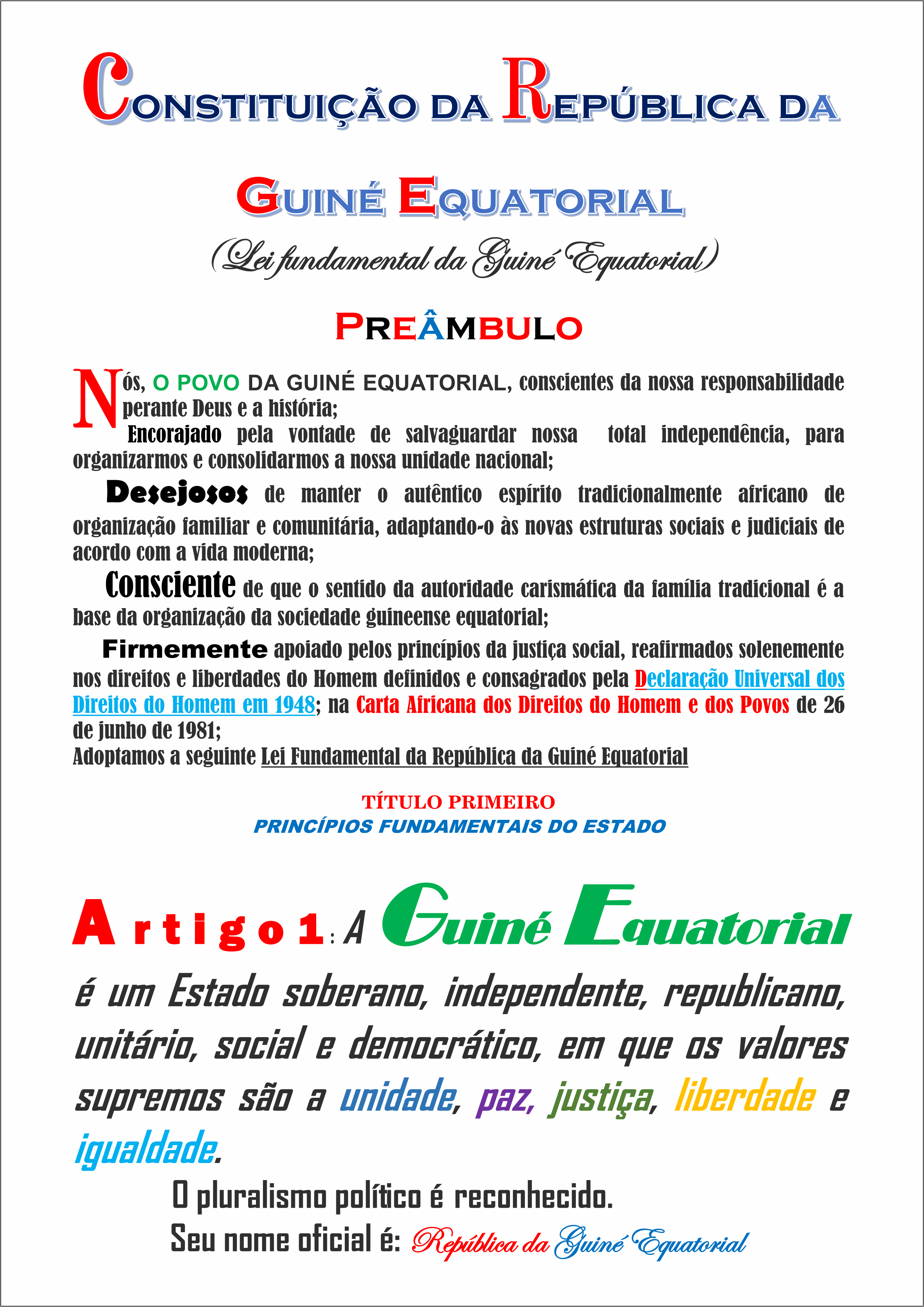
Official Equatoguinean constitutional article in Portuguese

=== Officialization of the Portuguese language in Equatorial Guinea ===
Portuguese was officially recognized as the third official language in Equatorial Guinea on July 20, 2010, in order to acquire full membership in the CPLP (Community of Portuguese Language Countries). The country also sought the support of the eight member countries (Angola, Brazil, Cape Verde, Guinea-Bissau, Mozambique, Portugal, São Tomé and Príncipe, and East Timor) to promote Portuguese language teaching in the country, to provide vocational training for its students, and to increase their recognition by the countries of the Lusophone community. On July 20, 2012, the CPLP again rejected Equatorial Guinea's request for full membership, but it was finally accepted during the Dili summit in of East Timor on July 23, 2014.

In the same year, the government of Equatorial Guinea said it would take measures to spread the Portuguese language in the country, by promoting its teaching in primary schools, and also approved the creation of a multidisciplinary Portuguese-speaking study center dedicated to CPLP countries, whose doors opened to the public in 2015.

== Annobonese Creole ==
Having discovered the uninhabited island in the 15th century, Portuguese colonizers decided to bring slaves from Angola and São Tomé and Príncipe to populate the island. Due to the interbreeding between the Portuguese and the African slaves, the Portuguese initially spoken on the island began to evolve into a Portuguese creole called Forro. Through the Treaty of El Pardo, Spain exchanged some of the Portuguese territories in the Gulf of Guinea for territories in South America. The island of Annobón and what is now Equatorial Guinea was therefore passed over into Spanish rule.

The government of Equatorial Guinea financed an Instituto Internacional da Língua Portuguesa (IILP) sociolinguistic study in Annobón, which noticed strong links with the Portuguese creole populations in São Tomé and Príncipe, Cape Verde and Guinea-Bissau.

== See also ==
- Equatoguinean Spanish
- Languages of Equatorial Guinea
- Annobonese Creole
- Pichinglis
- Portuguese-speaking African countries
- Portuguese language in Africa
