= Diccionario de americanismos =

Dictionaries produced by the Association of Academies

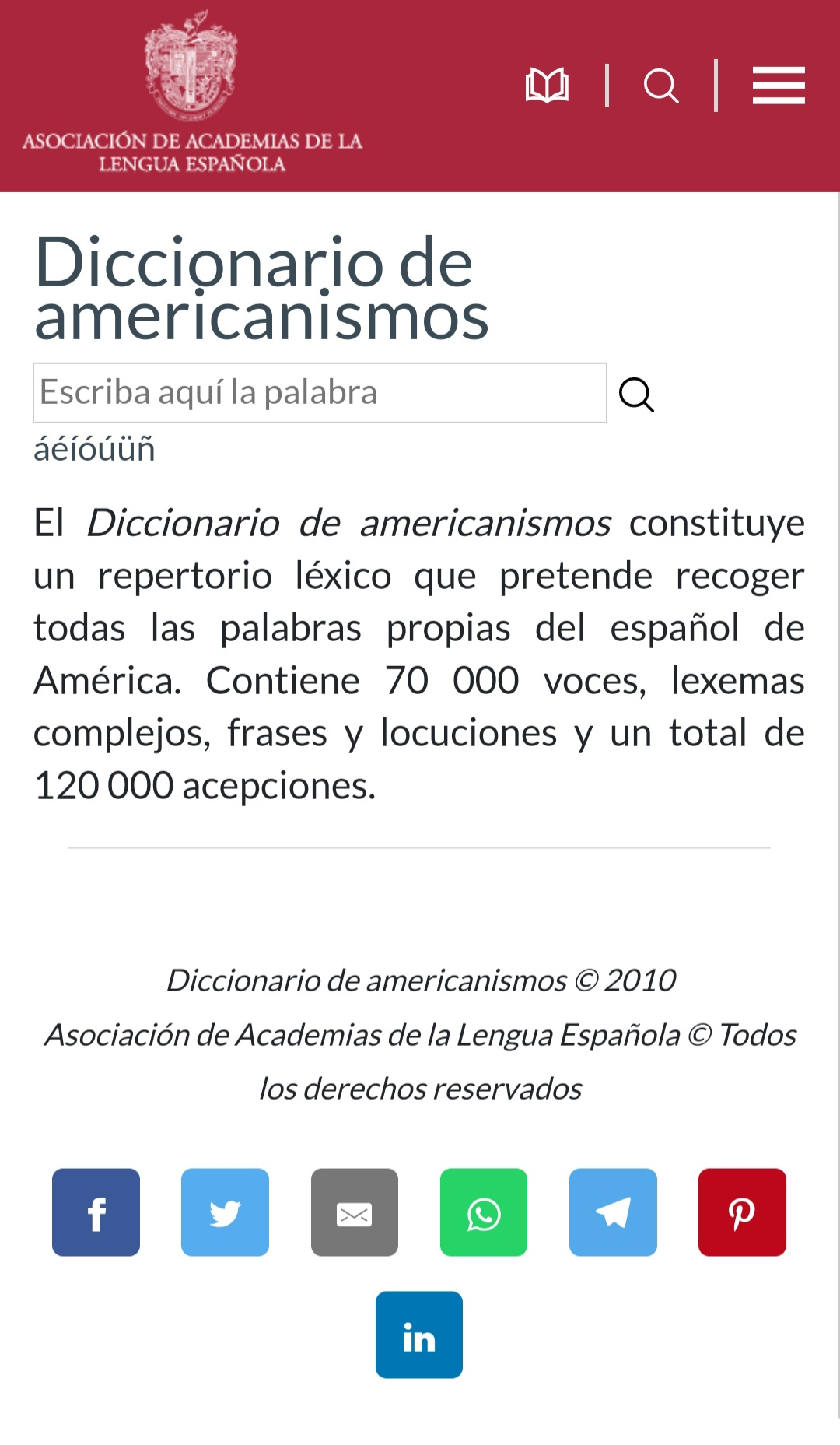
Official web page

The Diccionario de americanismos (Note: Spanish pronunciation: [ˌdiɡθjoˈnaɾjo de ameɾikaˈnismo]) (DA; English: Dictionary of Americanisms) is one of the dictionaries produced by the Association of Academies of the Spanish Language, which is made up of 23 associated academies. Their first edition was published in 2010, which coincided with some Latin American nations' bicentennials of independence.

Since the creation of the first 8 Spanish-language academies, they tried to create a dictionary of Americanisms, but the project was never completed. By 1998, in the congress carried out in Puebla de los Ángeles, it was unanimously proposed to draft a dictionary with a Hispanic-American approach. Finally, after the XII Congress carried out in San Juan, Diccionario de americanismos saw the light of day as a concrete and achievable short-term project in 2002. The first edition was launched in February 2010. In October 2013, the edition was published online.

The publication was sponsored by Repsol and the Regional Government of Andalusia.
