= Fernandino =

Fernardino or Fernandeño may refer to:

- The Fernandino people of Equatorial Guinea
- The Tongva, an indigenous people of California, called Fernandeños by the Spanish during colonization
