= Aegle =

Aegle may refer to:

- Aegle (mythology), a number of characters from Greek mythology
- 96 Aegle, an asteroid
- Aegle (plant), a genus of plants in the family Rutaceae
- Aegle (moth), a genus of moths in the family Noctuidae
- Aegle, the Equatoguinean Academy of the Spanish Language (Spanish: Academia Ecuatoguineana de la Lengua Española)
