= Manuel Núñez Asencio =

Dominican writer, historian and educator (born 1957)

Manuel Núñez Asencio (born 1957) is a Dominican Republic linguist, researcher, academic and essayist.

== Early life ==
He was born in 1957 in Santo Domingo, Dominican Republic. He obtained his bachelor's and master's degrees in modern literature from the University of Paris VII (Jussieu Campus) and Paris VIII (Saint Denis Campus). He subsequently specialised in applied linguistics and completed his PhD in applied linguistics at the University of Antilles Guyane (Fort de France).

He has been heavily involved in teaching. He served as professor of literature in the Foreign Languages Degree Program at the Technological University of Santiago in Santo Domingo (UTESA), where he directed the Department of Philosophy and Letters, and as professor of applied linguistics in the master's degree program in linguistics at the University of Santo Domingo (UASD), and in the master's degree program in teaching Spanish at the Technological Institute of Santo Domingo (INTEC). At the Diplomatic School of the Ministry of Foreign Affairs, as well as at the School of Advanced Studies of the Ministry of Defense, he teaches the subject of geopolitics. He is a full member of the Dominican Academy of Language.

== Recognition and works ==
He has been a columnist for the newspapers El Siglo and Hoy. He has been awarded the National Essay Prize twice for his book The Decline of the Dominican Nation (1990) and Peña Batlle in the Era of Trujillo (2008). More recently, he has written the novel The Last Sordello (Letra Gráfica, 2021). His published bibliography includes: The Opening of the Sealed Orchard (Boynayel, Mexico, 1985); The Graphic Essence (lithographs by Andrew Vlady, Mexico 1986); Language and Literature I, II, III, IV (Editorial Santillana, 1996–2000); Language, Companion of the Dominican Nation (2003), among other works. His book The Decline of the Dominican Nation won the Eduardo León Jimenes National Book Fair Prize 2002, a second expanded and corrected edition of the previous one.

== See also ==
- Dominican Republic literature
- University of Santo Domingo
- Dominican Academy of Language
