= Elsie Alvarado de Ricord =

Panamanian writer, a linguist

Elsie Alvarado de Ricord

Elsie Alvarado de Ricord (1928–2005) was a Panamanian writer, linguist, multiple winner of the Premio Ricardo Miró and first female director of the Panamanian Academy of Language.

== Biography ==
Alvarado de Ricord earned her title of Spanish Professor in the University of Panama, obtained a Ph.D. in Romanic Philology in the University of Madrid and a title of Linguistic researcher in the Linguistic Research School of Madrid. She was a member and director of the Panamanian Academy of Language, and President of the Linguistic Club of Panama. Her doctoral thesis entitled La Obra Poética de Dámaso Alonso won the first prize of the Spanish and Hispanic American thesis contest in 1963.

She was professor of general linguistics, literary theory, phonetics and Spanish historic grammar; also she was member of the Latin America Linguistics and Philology Association and of the Inter-American Linguistics and Languages Learning Programme and a corresponding member of the Royal Spanish Academy, member of the Uruguayan National Academy of Letters and of the North American Academy of the Spanish Language.

== Contributions to language studies ==
Ricord was an authority and a reference point in the Spanish language studies. During her time in the Panamanian Language Academy, she was a linguistic mediator and made recommendations about certain words and Spanish idiomatic expressions.

She was in favour of the word "enantes", widely used in the Panamanian everyday lexicon, but rejected by a large number of people because it is considered an archaism. Her argument was that the word "enantes" has never fallen into disuse in Panama, whereby, this term should not be censure, nor considered an archaism.

Likewise, she submitted her opposition to the elimination of the letters ch and ll from the Spanish alphabet, and defended her posture in the XI Language Congress in San José, Costa Rica and in Madrid in 1994.

Her work lead to the inclusion of the words "abuelazón" and "membresía" in the academic dictionary of 1992.

== Writings ==
Her works include narrative and verse with three and two Ricardo Miró awards respectively.

=== Narrative works ===
- Notas sobre la poesía de Demetrio Herrera Sevillano, 1951 (thesis).
- Estudio y densidad en la poesía de Ricardo J. Bermúdez, 1960 (critical analysis).
- Escritores panameños contemporáneos, 1962 (biographical notes of 20 authors).
- La obra poética de Dámaso Alonso, 1968 (essay).
- El Español de Panamá, 1971 (essay).
- Aproximación a la poesía de Ricardo Miró, 1973 (essay).
- Ruben Darío y su obra poética, 1978 (essay).
- Usos del español actual, 1996 (notes).

Books of poetry:

- Holocausto de rosa, 1953.
- Entre materia y sueño, 1966.
- Pasajeros en tránsito, 1973.
- Es real y es de este mundo, 1978.

=== Awards ===
She was awarded with the Rogelio Sinán award in 2002. She is the first person who received this award instituted by Act No. 14 February 7, 2001. This award consists in a medal of honor, a scroll of honor, and a cash prize of $10,000. This award was delivered by the President Mireya Moscoso in a ceremony held at the National Theatre. The President of the National Writers Council, Mr. Dimas Lidio Pitty delivered during the ceremony: Elsie Alvarado is the most complete woman of letters in our cultural history.
