= Fernandino people =

Ethnic groups in Equatorial Guinea

Fernandinos
Total population
- 13,500 – 18,000

Regions with significant populations
- Bioko Island, São Tomé and Príncipe

Languages
- Pichinglis, Krio, Bube, Igbo, Equatoguinean Spanish, French, Portuguese

Religion
- Christianity

Related ethnic groups
- Bubis, Sierra Leone Creoles, Emancipados, Saros, Americo-Liberians, African Americans, Atlantic Creoles

The Fernandino people are creoles, multi-ethnic or multi-racial populations who developed in Equatorial Guinea (Spanish Guinea). Their name is derived from the island of Fernando Pó, where many worked. This island was named for the Portuguese explorer Fernão do Pó, credited with discovering the region.

Each population had a distinct ethnic, social, cultural and linguistic history. Members of these communities provided most of the labor that built and expanded the cocoa farming industry on Fernando Pó during the 1880s and 1890s. The Fernandino of Fernando Po were closely related to each other. Because of the history of labor in this area, where workers were recruited, effectively impressed, from Freetown, Cape Coast, and Lagos, the Fernandino also had family ties to those areas. Eventually these ethnically distinct groups intermarried and integrated. In 21st-century Bioko, their differences are considered marginal.

== Native Fernandinos ==
The indigenous group of Fernandinos or Los Fernandinos, were mixed-race descendants of the indigenous population of Spanish Guinea originating from the island of Fernando Pó (modern day Bioko Island), an island discovered by the explorer Fernão do Pó. This group consisted of mulattoes of black female Bubi and white male Spanish parentage, and were part of the emancipados social class. Many children from such unions were not claimed by the father; however, some couples married under Catholic law. Because the Bubi women generally were responsible for rearing and caring for their mixed-race children, they identified with and were generally accepted by the Bubi tribe.

Similarly, the Portuguese-Indigenous descended mulatto population of São Tomé and Príncipe, an island also discovered by explorer Fernão do Pó, were also referred to as Fernandinos, at one point.

=== Language ===
Native Fernandinos spoke Equatoguinean Spanish, French, Bube and a form of pidgin English called Pichinglis. The dialect was used in trade activities, and may have varied slightly per region. In Francoist Spain, this creole dialect was stigmatized.

=== Religion ===
Most Bubi living on Bioko during the colonial era became Roman Catholic. The mulatto Fernandinos were raised chiefly as Roman Catholic.

== Krio Fernandinos ==
The other Fernandinos of Equatorial Guinea were descended from English-speaking freed slaves of Sierra Leone and Liberia. Essentially, Krios are descendants of blacks who were resettled from London, the Caribbean and Nova Scotia to Sierra Leone in the late 18th and early 19th centuries. Some were formerly slaves in the United States who had been freed by the British after the American Revolutionary War. They were joined by Africans liberated from the illegal slave trade by British forces after 1808.

In separate actions, supported by the American Colonization Society, groups of free African Americans emigrated to Liberia, established as a US colony in West Africa, in the antebellum years. Their numbers were also added to by Africans liberated from the slave trade along the west coast of Africa.

Workers from both Sierra Leone and especially Liberia were transported as workers to Bioko Island. As English speakers with some Anglo culture, they became a dominant force in the evolution of local society and economy and took on leadership roles. They tended to marry among themselves, as they identified as separate from the local, less educated and/or liberated indigenous peoples. The Krios eventually blended with the local populations, with Krio women and children taking on the surnames of indigenous families. They have contributed to the ethnically/racially mixed peoples who live along the West Coast of Africa.

The Krios arrived from Sierra Leone on the island of Fernando Po in 1827, a year after Great Britain leased the island for 50 years. The Krios joined an influx of several hundred freed Creole African-descended immigrants from Cape Coast and other groups from British colonies in Africa. The Krios began populating the harbor known as Clarence Cove. The first inhabitants purchased dwellings for $3,000 to $5,000, along with a handful of large plantation owners who had engaged in the cocoa and yam farming industry. This was chiefly controlled by English and Spanish factory owners. A nineteenth-century British historian characterized Krios as noted for their scholastic achievement and business acumen.

=== Marriage ===
The group is closely related to other West African Creole communities in Freetown, Cape Coast and Lagos. Endogamy was a common marriage practice, and families aligned themselves in order to maintain, and increase, property ownership as well as social and business alliances outside of the island. Because of this, prior to the 20th century, marriages with non-Creoles, known as bush marriages, were not recognized by the church or in estate claims. However, they were recognized socially.

=== Culture ===
Krio Fernandinos were heavily Anglophone and Protestant as well as a cultural arm of British West Africa. They were once noted as being highly xenophobic. A notable example of this was a Krio Fernandino, and son of a Scottish father, named Henry Hugh Gardner. He was beaten by Spanish police after he murdered his African-Catholic Cameroon-born common-law wife, Victoria Castellanos. At the bequest of his mother, Gardner refused to marry Castellanos because she refused religious conversion. She, then, became involved with a Catholic-convert which infuriated Gardener.

Krio Fernandinos were, initially, unimpressed and indifferent to Spanish rule. However, by the late-1800s, as Spanish cultural and religious influence grew on the island, Krio Fernandinos found that exclusively marrying into their traditional identity became less practical for political and economic survival.

=== Language ===
Throughout the generations, the Fernandinos maintained their creole language, Fernando Po Creole English (a.k.a. Pichinglis). Krio Fernandinos are exclusively concentrated around Malabo. Although they comprise a distinct ethnic group in Equatorial Guinea, their pidgin dialect is spoken in only six communities (Musola, Las Palmas, Sampaca, Basupu, Fiston and Balueri de Cristo Rey / Bottle Nose). In 1998 it was estimated that the number of fluent speakers of this Equatoguinean language was 5,000. About one-fifth of those 5,000 speakers have this Creole English as their only language. Up to 70,000 Equatoguineans may use it as a trade language. In the 21st century, Fernando Po Creole English and Pichinglis have long been fused into one dialect.

=== Religion ===
The majority of Krio Fernandinos are Christian. Krios have contributed to development of the Protestant church in Bioko. Descendants of Iberian parentage tend to be Catholic.

== See also ==
- Afro-Hispanic people
- Afro-Spaniards
- Atlantic Creole
- Aku people
- Black African
- Gold Coast Euro-Africans
- Freetown
- Fernão do Pó, formerly part of Fernando Pó which included Bioko Island.
- São Tomé and Príncipe
- Saro people
- Sierra Leone Creole people
- Spanish Guinea
- Spanish Equatoguineans
