= Paraguayan Spanish =

Variety of Spanish language

- Español paraguayo
- Pronunciation: [espaˈɲol paɾaˈɣwaʝo]
- Native to: Paraguay
- Native speakers: 6 million (2014)
- Language family: Indo-European: Italic; Latino-Faliscan; Romance; Western; Ibero-Romance; West Iberian; Castilian; Spanish; Paraguayan Spanish
- Early forms: Old Latin: Classical Latin; Vulgar Latin; Old Spanish; Early Modern Spanish
- Writing system: Latin (Spanish alphabet)

Official status
- Regulated by: Academia Paraguaya de la Lengua Española

Language codes
- ISO 639-1: es
- ISO 639-2: spa
- ISO 639-3: –
- Glottolog: None
- IETF: es-PY

Paraguayan Spanish (Spanish: español paraguayo) is the set of dialects of the Spanish language spoken in Paraguay. In addition, it influences the speech of the Argentine provinces of Misiones, Corrientes, Formosa, and, to a lesser extent, Chaco. Paraguayan Spanish possesses marked characteristics of the Spanish previously spoken in northern Spain, because a majority of the first Spanish settlers were from Old Castile and the Basque Country. In addition, there is great influence, in both vocabulary and grammar, from the Guarani language. Guarani is co-official with Spanish in Paraguay, and most Paraguayans speak both languages. Guaraní is the home language of more than half the population of Paraguay, with higher proportions of its use in rural areas, and those who speak Spanish at home slightly in the majority in the cities. In addition to the strong influence of Guarani, Paraguayan Spanish is also influenced by Rioplatense Spanish due to the geographical, historical, and cultural proximity, as well as the sharing of features such as voseo, which is "the use of vos as a second-person singular pronoun." Paraguayan Spanish is notable for its lack of yeísmo, meaning that the phonemes /ʎ/ (spelled ⟨ll⟩) and /ʝ/ (spelled ⟨y⟩) are distinguished.

The Swedish linguist Bertil Malmberg visited Paraguay in 1946 and observed several features of Spanish pronunciation that he attributed to Guaraní influence. The Guaraní origin of many of these features, however, has been questioned by other researchers, who document them in dialects not in contact with Guaraní.

== Characteristics ==
=== Overview ===
The unique features of Paraguayan Spanish developed in part due to Paraguay's early isolation; for example, José Gaspar Rodríguez de Francia, the country's president until 1840, sealed Paraguay's borders. Other experiences with geographic, political, and economic isolation relative to its neighbours allowed Spanish spoken in Paraguay to develop its own unique characteristics, even apart from the wide-ranging influence of Guarani.

Paraguay is, depending on the context, considered part of a region of South America known as the Southern Cone (Spanish: Cono Sur; Portuguese: Cone Sul). In its truest definition, the region consists of Chile, Argentina, and Uruguay, but can be expanded to include Paraguay and some regions of Brazil (Paraná, Rio Grande do Sul, Santa Catarina, and São Paulo). Excluding Brazil (where Portuguese is spoken), all the countries in that region have many similarities in vocabulary. Paraguayan Spanish shares many similarities with River Plate Spanish (that is, the variety spoken in Argentina and Uruguay) such as the use of the voseo and various words and phrases.

- Like all American dialects of Spanish, Paraguayan Spanish has seseo, meaning that it lacks the distinction between /θ/ and /s/ that is present in Standard European Spanish.
- Syllable-final /ɾ/ is pronounced as [ɹ] (as in American English red) before /l/ or /s/, influenced by a substrate from Native American languages; perla ('pearl') and verso ("verse") are pronounced [ˈpeɹla] and [ˈbeɹso].
- Like in rural northern Spain, the Andes mountains, and in Philippine Spanish, Paraguayan Spanish lacks yeísmo, the historical merger of the phoneme /ʎ/ (spelled ⟨ll⟩) with /ʝ/ (spelled ⟨y⟩). For speakers with yeísmo, the verbs cayó 's/he fell' and calló 's/he fell silent' are homophones, both pronounced [kaˈʝo]. (In dialects that lack yeísmo, maintaining the historical distinction, the two words are pronounced respectively [kaˈʝo] and [kaˈʎo].) Yeísmo characterizes the speech of most Spanish speakers both in Spain and in the Americas.

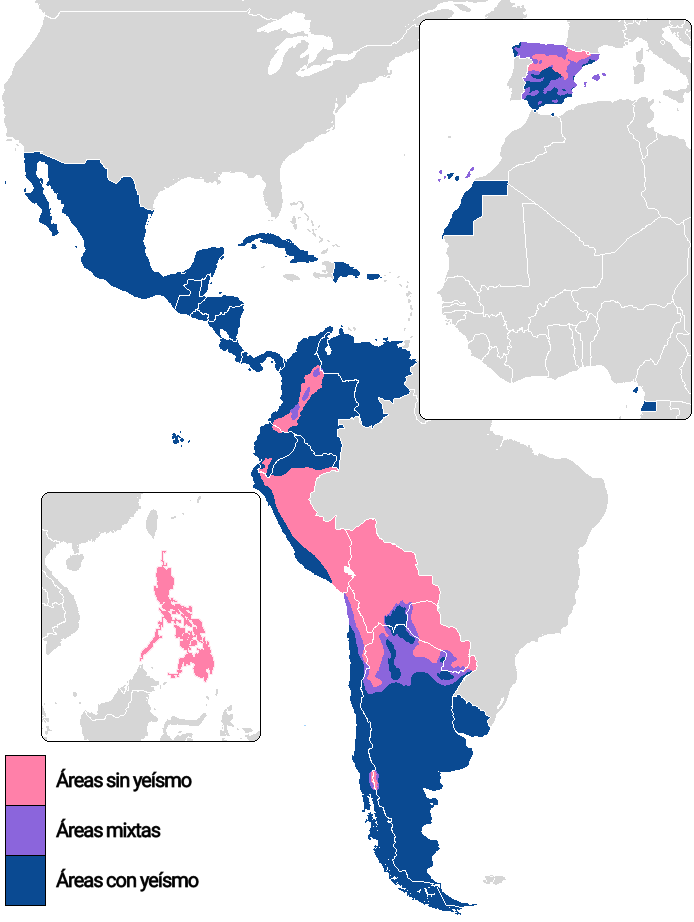
The pink areas are where Spanish speakers preserve the phoneme /ʎ/, represented by ⟨ll⟩.

=== Main characteristics ===
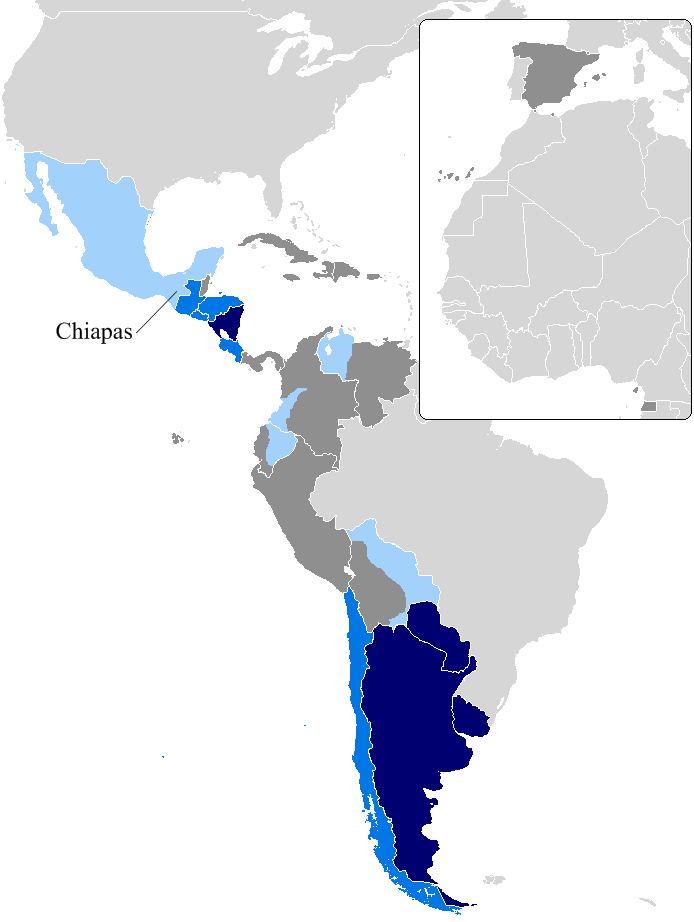
The regions in dark blue completely replace tú with vos. In the regions in lighter blue, tuteo and voseo occur simultaneously. In the regions in grey, only tuteo occurs.

- Partial preservation of the contrast between the graphemes ⟨ll⟩ and ⟨y⟩, traditionally pronounced as /ʎ/ and /ʝ/ respectively. (see Yeismo)
- Voseo: pronominal and verbal, identical to River Plate Spanish.
- Leísmo: when one uses le in the context of a direct object pronoun instead of the personal pronouns lo and la.
- Contains fewer pauses and less "musical" intonation than River Plate Spanish.
- Lexicon borrowed from Guarani, Lunfardo, and other European languages.

=== Pronunciation ===
- The grouping "tr" is pronounced as a voiceless postalveolar affricate [tɹ̝̊], similar to the sound of the digraph ⟨ch⟩.
- Assibilation of the "r" to [ɹ̝].
- Wide diffusion of labiodental [ʋ~v] for [β].
- Word-final /n/ has alveolar articulation, not velar.
- Velar, rather than glottal realization of /x/.
- Hiatus conservation.
- Stable vowel system.
- Articulation of /b/, /d/, and /ɡ/ as approximants not only in the intervocalic position but sometimes also in the initial position.
- Use of the alveolar approximant [ɹ] for the pre-consonantal and final "r," similar to the pronunciation in American English or Hollandic Dutch. Example: firmar [fiɹˈmaɹ].

=== Dynamics of Guarani-Spanish ===
Typical Paraguayan Spanish has a strong influence from the sentence structure of Guarani as translated to Spanish, as well as the words and borrowed particles of Guarani for colloquial expressions. These are some common cases:

- Guarani particles among Castilian words to emphasize expressions. Examples:
  - -na ("por favor"). E.g.: Vamos na = Vamos por favor
  - -pa, -pió, -piko, -ta (interrogative particle without translation). E.g.: ¿Para qué pa?, ¿Para qué pió? = ¿Para qué?
  - -ko, -nio, -ngo (particle to emphasize something). E.g.: Ese ko es de ella.
- Words taken from Guarani for use in everyday Spanish. Examples:
  - -gua'u (falsehood). E.g.: De gua'u nomás era = Era solo una mentira.
  - ¡Mbore! (exclamation, rejecting something). Synonymous with: ¡Ni loco!
  - ¡Kore!, ¡Nderakóre! (exclamation, colloquially used for something terrible). Synonymous with: Oh no!
  - che kapé (my friend) E.g.: ¿Qué tal, che kapé? = What's up, my friend?
  - ¿Mba'éichapa?, ¿Mba'etekó?, or ¿Ha upéi? (greeting). Synonymous with: What's up?
  - Porã or iporã (good).
  - ¡Nde tavy! (exclamation, expressing surprise or bewilderment, lit. 'you're crazy!')
- Sentences taken from Guarani translated partially or erroneously translated for use in everyday Spanish. Examples:
  - "Se fue en Itauguá" (from the Guarani "oho Itauguápe", since the 'pe' is used interchangeably as 'a' or 'en')
  - "Voy a venir" (literally from the Guarani "aháta aju", used as a synonym of "voy y vuelvo")
  - "Vení un poco" (calque of the word "ejúmina" in Guarani)
  - "Demasiado mucho calor hace" (calque of the word "hetaiterei" in Guarani)
  - "Te dije luego" (from the Guarani "ha'e voi ningo ndéve", in which the "luego" emphasizes the previous action)
  - "Me voy a ir ahora después" (calque of the Guarani sentence "aháta aga upéi", in which the "ahora" emphasizes when the action will take place)
  - "Habló por mi" (literally from the Guarani "oñe'ẽ cherehe", used as a synonym of "habló de mi")
- Paraguayisms, words and sentences in Spanish, but influenced by Guarani. Examples:
  - "Me hallo" ("hallar" is used as a synonym for "alegrar" instead of indicating the location situation)
  - "Anda por su cabeza" (influenced by the Guarani "oiko iñakãre", which would be "hace lo que quiere, sin control, sin juicio")
  - "Te voy a quitar una foto" ("quitar" is used as a synonym for "sacar" or "tomar" in the case of taking pictures)

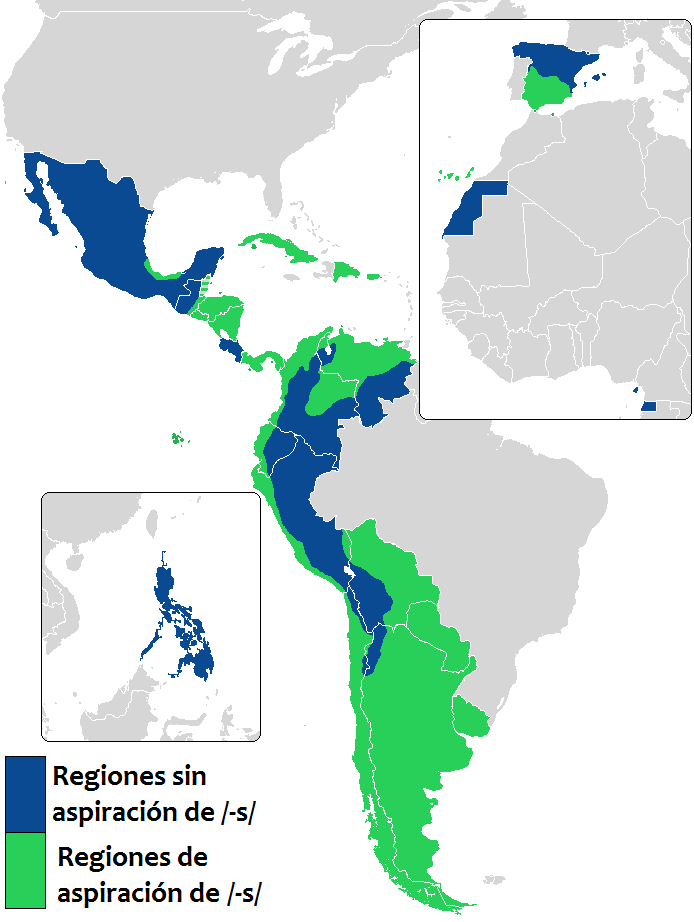
The regions in green present post-vocalic aspiration of /s/; the regions in blue do not.

=== Similarities with Rioplatense Spanish ===
Due to the geographical and cultural proximity of Paraguay and Argentina, the two countries' dialects are often confused. In fact, along the border between Argentina and Paraguay, the local dialects of both countries have fused, creating a northeastern Argentine variety very similar to Paraguayan Spanish in the provinces along the border. Examples:

- Common use of the expression «che».
- Sporadic aspiration of /s/ in colloquial speech.
- Educated voseo and similar in conjugation.
- Shares part of the River Plate lexicon (e.g., some words in Lunfardo).

=== Voseo ===
Voseo is a peculiar characteristic of Paraguayan Spanish which is heavily influenced by the River Plate dialect (since historically in Paraguay Guarani was always spoken, and Spanish was relegated to the inhabitants of the capital or the most favored classes in the interior of the country). Another characteristic of voseo is how long it has been around for. "Voseo is the oldest form of Castilian Spanish". After the second half of the 20th century, the teaching of voseo depended on whether the teacher used vos or not. Adding to the strong Argentinian influence, either by the media or by the geographical and cultural proximity, voseo stayed as a distinctive characteristic of Paraguayan. Although it is rarely taught in schools today, voseo is beginning to regain some popularity in the form of an accepted regional dialect.

== See also ==
- Paraguay–Spain relations
- Academia Paraguaya de la Lengua Española
- Jopara (yopará in Spanish)– a colloquial form of Guarani that uses a large number of Spanish loan words.
- Paraguayan Guaraní (dialect)
- Paraguayan Academy of Language
