= Academia Salvadoreña de la Lengua =

The Academia Salvadoreña de la Lengua (Spanish for Salvadoran Academy of Language) is an association of academics and experts on the use of the Spanish language in El Salvador.

It was founded in San Salvador, El Salvador on November 17, 1875 and approved by the Real Academia Española on October 19, 1876. It is a member of the Association of Spanish Language Academies.

== History ==
Writer Torres Caicebo initiated the founding of the Salvadoran Academy dating back to 1872.

The Salvadoran Academy was formally founded on November 17, 1875 and approved by the Royal Spanish Academy on October 19, 1976.

It was originally named Academia Salvadoreña Correspondiente de la Española (Spanish for Salvadoran Academy corresponding to the Spanish) and in 1915 was renamed Academia Salvadoreña de Cervantes (Spanish for Salvadoran Academy of Cervantes). Then, in 1919 it was given the full name Academia Salvadoreña de la Lengua, Correspondiente de la Real Academia Española (Spanish for Salvadoran Academy of Language, corresponding to the Royal Spanish Academy).
