= Pichinglis =

English-based creole of Bioko, Equatorial Guinea

- Fernando Po Creole English
- Pichi
- Native to: Bioko, Equatorial Guinea
- Native speakers: L1: 6,000 (2011); L2: 70,000 (2011)
- Language family: English-African Creole: Guinea Coast Creole English; West African Pidgin English; Krio; Pichinglis

Language codes
- ISO 639-3: fpe
- Glottolog: fern1234
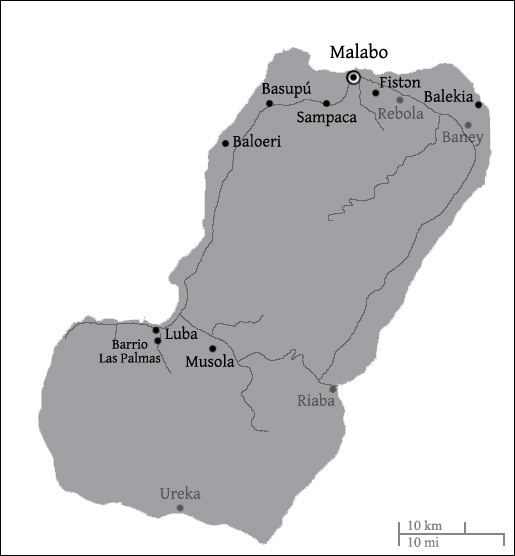
- Pichi-speaking communities in Bioko (in bold)

Pichinglis, commonly referred to by its speakers as Pichi and formally known as Fernando Po Creole English (Fernandino), is an Atlantic English-lexicon creole language spoken on the island of Bioko, Equatorial Guinea. It is an offshoot of the Krio language of Sierra Leone which, like other varieties of West African Pidgin English originated as a language of contact between colonizing British and African slave traders for the transatlantic slave trade. It was brought to Bioko by Sierra Leone Krio people who immigrated to the island during the colonial era in the 19th century.

Pichi is the most widely spoken language of the former capital Malabo, next to Spanish, and it serves as a primary language to probably the majority of the city's inhabitants. Pichi is also used as a primary language in a number of villages and towns along the Coast of Bioko – amongst them Sampaca, Fiston, Basupú, Barrio las Palmas and Luba, and is spoken as a lingua franca throughout Bioko. It is also spoken by a sizable community of people originating from Bioko in Bata, the largest town on the continental part of the country.

== Size of speaker community ==
Pichi is believed to have derived from the Krio language, which first arrived in Bioko, the former Fernando Po, with African settlers from Freetown, Sierra Leone in 1827 (Fyfe 1962: 165). No official figures exist, but there is good reason to assume that Pichi is today the second most widely spoken African language of the country behind Fang, closely followed by Bubi. It is safe to assume that at least 100,000 people of the country's population of around one million use Pichi regularly as a primary or secondary language.

Next to Fang, Pichi and Bubi, over ten other African languages are spoken by the peoples of Equatorial Guinea.

One of these is another Creole, the Portuguese-lexicon Creole Fá d'Ambô, spoken by the people of the island of Annobón. Fa d’Ambô shares historical and linguistic ties with the other Portuguese-lexicon Creoles of the Gulf of Guinea, namely Lungwa Santome and Angolar in São Tomé Island and Lun'gwiye in Principe Island. Also the influence of Pichi on Fa d’Ambô.

The other languages traditionally spoken in Equatorial Guinea belong to the Bantu branch of the Niger–Congo family. In the literature, Pichi is known under the names Fernando Po Creole English, Fernando Po Krio, Fernandino Creole English, Pidgin (English), Broken English, and Pichinglis. While many older speakers refer to the language as Krio or Pidgin, most present-day speakers refer to it as Pichinglis, Pichin with a nasalised final vowel or Pichi tout court.

== Present status ==
The lexical similarity between Pichi and English and the supposed simplification of English structures that European observers believed they recognized in a language they did not master, lent additional weight to racist notions about a generally assumed superiority of European languages and their speakers. As a consequence, Pichi was considered an impoverished, debased form of English by Spanish colonial administrators and missionaries. Pichi, like the other Creole languages of the Atlantic Basin, still has to struggle with this difficult legacy. In spite of its great importance as a community language, and as a national and international lingua franca, Pichi enjoys no official recognition nor support, is conspicuously absent from public discourse and the official media, and has no place in the educational policy of Equatorial Guinea.

== Linguistic affiliation ==
Pichi is a member of the African branch of the family of Atlantic English-lexicon Creoles. It descends directly from Krio, the English-lexicon Creole that rose to become the language of the Creole community of Freetown, Sierra Leone in the late 18th century. Throughout the better part of the 19th century, this community, which had emerged from the horrors of slavery and the slave trade, began to forge a vibrant African-European culture and economy along the West African seaboard. Mutual intelligibility within the African branch is quite high. However, an impediment to fluid communication between speakers of Pichi and its sister languages is the divergent path of development of Pichi since 1857. In that year, Spain began to actively enforce colonial rule in Equatorial Guinea. From then onwards, Pichi was cut off from the direct influence of English, the language from which it inherited the largest part of its lexicon. Some of the present-day differences between Pichi and its sister languages can be attributed to internal developments in Pichi. But without doubt, an equally important reason for the separate development of Pichi is the extensive degree of language contact with Equatoguinean Spanish, the colonial and present-day official language of Equatorial Guinea.

== Language contact between Pichi and Spanish ==
Spanish has left a deep imprint on the lexicon and grammar of Pichi. Code-mixing is an integral part of the linguistic system of Pichi. The pervasive influence of Spanish on Pichi is for one part, the consequence of language policy. Since colonial rule, Spanish has remained the sole medium of instruction at all levels of the educational system. There is a widespread competence in different registers of Spanish by Pichi speakers in Malabo. In Malabo, the acquisition of Spanish begins in early childhood, even for many working-class Equatoguineans with little or no school education. Equally, the burgeoning oil economy of Equatorial Guinea has led to increased urbanisation, extending multi-ethnic social networks and the spread of Pichi as a native language. In such a socio-economic environment and amidst a high general competence in the official language Spanish, code-mixing between Pichi and Spanish, rather than being exceptional, is consciously and confidently articulated in daily life.

=== Some examples of Pichi–Spanish code-mixing ===
Spanish words are in bold in the following Pichi sentences.

Afta ùna bay dì bloques dɛ̀n tumara.
then 2PL buy DEF bricks PL tomorrow
'Then buy [plural] the bricks tomorrow.'

À raya in wèt rayador.
1SG.SBJ grate 3SG.EMP with grater
'I grated it with a grater.'

À gò sigue chɔp.
1SG.SBJ POT continue eat
'I'll continue eating.'

== Overview of Pichi grammar ==
Pichi has a seven vowel system featuring the phonemes /i, e, ɛ, a, ɔ, o, u/. The consonant phonemes of Pichi are twenty-two: /p, b, t, d, tʃ, dʒ, k, ɡ, f, v, s, ʁ, h, m, n, ɲ, ŋ, l, w, j, kp, ɡb/. The co-articulated labiovelar plosives /kp/ and /ɡb/ are marginal and only occur in ideophones.
The language features a mixed prosodic system which employs both pitch accent and tone. Pichi has two distinctive tones, a high (H) and a low (L) tone. In pitch-accented words, a phonetic (L) tone is the default realisation of a toneless syllable (X). Examples follow with the four possible tonal configurations for bisyllabic words:

Word	Pitch class	Gloss
human	H.X	'woman'
wàtá	X.H	'water'
nyɔní	H.H	'ant'
bàta	L.L	'buttocks'

The morphological structure of Pichi is largely isolating. However, there is a limited use of inflectional and derivational morphology in which affixation, tone and suppletive forms are put to use. For example, the categories of tense, modality and aspect are expressed through phonologically distinct preverbal particles. The verb stem is not altered:

Dan awa à bìn dɔn dè slip.
that hour 1SG.SBJ PST PRF IPFV sleep
'(At) that time, I was already sleeping.'

Besides that, there is a limited use of inflectional morphology in the pronominal system, in which both tone and suppletive forms are used to express case relations. For example, the dependent subject pronoun à '1SG.SBJ' has the allomorphs mì '1SG.POSS' and mi '3SG.EMP'. In the following example, tone alone distinguishes possessive from objective case of the 1SG personal pronoun:

Dɛ̀n tif mi mì sus.
3PL steal 1SG.EMP 1SG.POSS shoe
'They stole my shoes from me.'

Pichi is an aspect-prominent language in which aspect (and mood), rather than tense plays a dominant role in expressing temporal relations. Besides that, the modal system includes an indicative-subjunctive opposition. Subjunctive mood is instantiated in the modal complementiser mek 'SBJV' and occurs in contexts characterised by the presence of deontic modality, i.e. in directive main clauses such as imperatives as well as in the subordinate clauses of deontic modality inducing main predicates (see the first example below). Subjunctive mood also occurs in purpose clauses (see the second example below):

È nak dì plet pàn dì tebul bìkɔs è want mek dì plet brok.
3SG.SBJ hit DEF plate on DEF table because 3SG.SBJ want SBJV DEF plate break
'He hit the plate on the table because he wanted the plate to break.'

Dɛ̀n kan kɛr mi nà Madrid fɔ̀ mek dɛ̀n go opera mi.
3pl PFV carry 1SG.EMP LOC Madrid ASS SBJV 3pl go operate 1SG.EMP
'They took me to Madrid in order to go and operate on me.'

The language exhibits a subject–verb word order in intransitive clauses and a subject–verb–object order in transitive clauses. Content questions are formed by way of a mixed question-word system which involves transparent (e.g. us=tin 'which=thing' = 'what') and opaque question elements (udat 'who').

Clause linkage is characterised by a large variety of strategies and forms, in which the subordinator we, the quotative marker se, and the two modal complementisers fɔ̀ and mek stand out as multifunctional elements with overlapping functions. The language also features various types of multiverb and serial verb constructions. Amongst the latter figure instrumental serial verb constructions involving the verb tek 'take' as well as comparative constructions featuring the verb pas '(sur)pass'.

== See also ==
- Bioko
- Equatorial Guinea
- Fernandino peoples
- Equatoguinean Portuguese
- Equatoguinean Spanish

== Relevant literature ==
- Yakpo, Kofi (2009). A grammar of Pichi (PhD thesis). Radboud University Nijmegen. hdl:2066/79407.
- Yakpo, Kofi (2013). "Pichi". In Susanne Michaelis; Philippe Maurer; Martin Haspelmath; Magnus Huber (eds.). The survey of pidgin and creole languages. Vol. 1. Oxford: Oxford University Press. pp. 194–205.
- Yakpo, Kofi (2019). A Grammar of Pichi. Studies in Diversity Linguistics 23. Berlin: Language Science Press. doi:10.5281/zenodo.2546450. ISBN 978-3-96110-133-7.
