= Academia Venezolana de la Lengua =

Venezuelan Spanish language academy

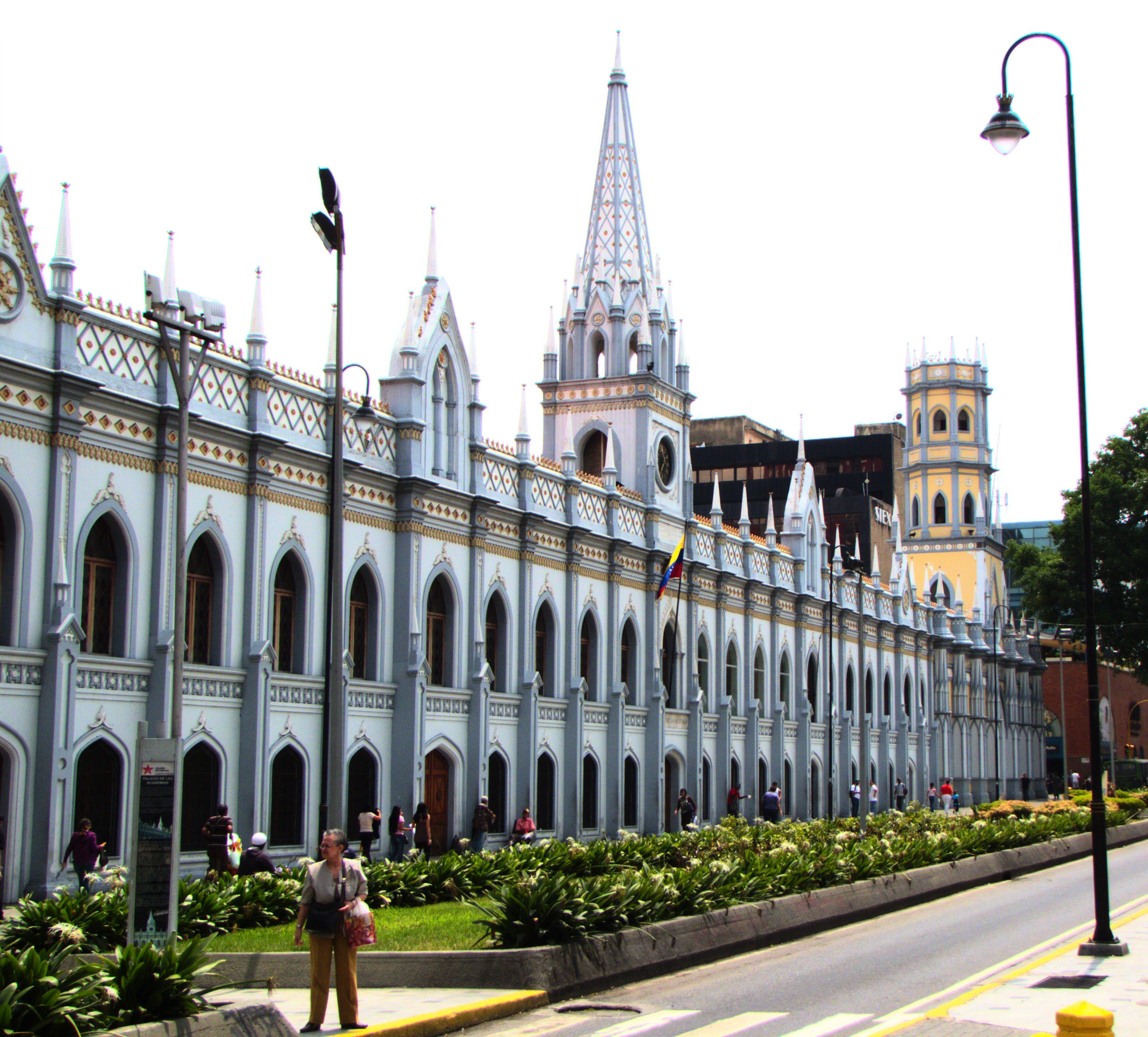
- Palacio de las Academias in Caracas is the headquarters building
- Abbreviation: AVL
- Formation: July 26, 1883; 143 years ago
- Type: NGO
- Purpose: Language Academy for Venezuelan Spanish
- Headquarters: Caracas
- Region served: Venezuela
- Members: Association of Spanish Language Academies
- Website: avelengua.org.ve

The Academia Venezolana de la Lengua (Spanish for Venezuelan Academy of Language) is an association of academics and experts on Venezuelan Spanish, the variant of the Spanish language in Venezuela. It was founded in Caracas on July 26, 1883. It is a member of the Association of Spanish Language Academies.

== See also ==
- Category:Members of the Venezuelan Academy of Language (includes past members)
