= Fernão do Pó =

15th-century Portuguese explorer of the West African coast

Fernão do Pó (Portuguese pronunciation: [fɨɾˈnɐ̃w du ˈpɔ]; fl. 1472), also known as Fernão Pó, Fernando Pó or Fernando Poo, was a 15th-century Portuguese navigator and explorer of the West African coast. He was the first European to see the islands in the Gulf of Guinea around 1472, one of which until the mid-1900s bore a version of his name, Fernando Pó or Fernando Poo. The island is now named Bioko and is part of Equatorial Guinea. His name had also been given to several other places in nearby Cameroon; the village of Fernando Pó, Portugal; and the village of Fernando Pó, Sierra Leone.

== Biography ==
Little is known about him or his life. He was one of the navigators working for Fernão Gomes, joining João de Santarém, Pedro Escobar, Lopo Gonçalves, and Pedro de Sintra, a merchant from Lisbon who was granted a monopoly over trade in part of the Gulf of Guinea. He was among a number of navigators who explored the Gulf of Guinea during this period on behalf of King Afonso V of Portugal.

Fernando Pó was the first European explorer to explore the Cameroon coast.

== See also ==
- Annobón
- Bight of Bonny
- Bioko
- Cameroon line
- Equatorial Guinea
- Fernandino peoples
- Gulf of Guinea
- Colonial São Tomé and Príncipe
