= Academia Nicaragüense de la Lengua =

The Academia Nicaragüense de la Lengua (Spanish for Nicaraguan Academy of Language) is an association of academics and experts on the use of the Spanish language in Nicaragua. It was founded in Managua on May 31, 1928. It is a member of the Association of Spanish Language Academies. In May 2022, Daniel Ortega's government withdrew the legal status of the association.
