= Academia Panameña de la Lengua =

The Academia Panameña de la Lengua (Spanish for Panamanian Academy of Language) is an association of academics and experts on the use of the Spanish language in Panama. It was founded in Panama City on August 9, 1926. Both former presidents Ricardo Joaquín Alfaro Jované and Ernesto de la Guardia were members of the academy. It is a member of the Association of Spanish Language Academies.

== History ==
The Panamanian Academy of the Spanish Language was established on May 12, 1926, and officially founded on August 9, 1926. As a member of the Association of Academies of the Spanish Language, this institution is dedicated to promoting the dissemination of significant Panamanian publications and books. It is tasked with developing a lexicon of accepted Panamanianisms, including neologisms and archaisms, complete with citations and annotations. These are submitted to the Royal Spanish Academy (RAE) for potential inclusion in future editions of the Official Dictionary of the Language.

The founding of the academy was marked by the appointment of eighteen notable Panamanian intellectuals by the Royal Spanish Academy. These included Samuel Lewis García de Paredes as director, Eduardo Chiari as treasurer, and Ricardo Miró as perpetual secretary, along with other distinguished figures such as Ricardo J. Alfaro, Guillermo Andreve, and Belisario Porras.

== Headquarters ==
The headquarters of the Panamanian Academy of Language is located in a large house with architecture from the first quarter of the twentieth century in the sector of Calle 50, in the district of Bella Vista, located in the urban and economic area of Panama City.

== Functions ==
In Panama, the Academy of the Spanish Language conducts various activities including organizing conferences on linguistic, literary, and humanistic topics. The Director, along with one or two other academicians, represents the Academy at the congresses organized periodically by the Association of Academies of the Spanish Language. This association, which comprises 22 member academies, holds meetings every six months where terms are presented and evaluated by a commission of the Royal Spanish Academy (RAE) for potential inclusion in the official dictionary.

Arístides Royo, the current director of the Academy, has outlined the institution's functions as follows:

The Academia Panameña de la Lengua wants to be an institution that all Panamanians consider as the house where the Spanish language is preserved, cared for and strengthened. We want Panamanians to come to it to resolve any language doubts they may have, to enjoy the lectures that are given and the films based on fundamental works of world literature.

== Directors ==
The directors of the Academia Panameña de la Lengua are elected for three-year terms. The academy has been led by several distinguished figures over the years. Nicolás Victoria Jaén served as director in 1939, followed by Ricardo J. Alfaro in 1950, and Baltasar Isaza Calderón in 1960. Ernesto de la Guardia Navarro took over in 1973, succeeded by Ismael García S. in 1979. Elsie Alvarado de Ricord directed the academy in 1991, and Pablo Pinilla Chiari in 2003. Dr. José Guillermo Ros-Zanet was appointed in 2006, followed by Berna Pérez Ayala de Burrell in 2009. Margarita Vásquez Quirós led from 2015 until 2017, when Arístides Royo assumed the directorship.
