= Academia Dominicana de la Lengua =

Spanish language association in Dominican Republic

Dominican Academy of the Language
- Academia Dominicana de la Lengua (Spanish)
- Abbreviation: ADL
- Established: October 12, 1927; 99 years ago
- Founded at: Santo Domingo, Dominican Republic
- Purpose: Dominican Spanish
- Headquarters: Casa de las Academias de República Dominicana
- Location: Ciudad Colonial
- Region served: Dominican Republic
- Official languages: Spanish
- Director: Bruno Rosario Candelier
- Publication: Diccionario del español dominicano
- Affiliations: Association of Academies of the Spanish Language
- Website: www.academia.org.do (in Spanish)

Academia Dominicana de la Lengua (variously translated as the Dominican Academy of Language, the Dominican Academy of the Language, the Dominican Academy of Letters, or glossed as the Dominican Academy of the Spanish Language; acronym ADL) is the Dominican Republic's correspondent academy of the Royal Spanish Academy. It was founded in Santo Domingo on 12 October 1927 and, like the other academies, has the principal function of working to regulate the Spanish language in the Dominican Republic.

It was created by the initiative of Archbishop Adolfo Alejandro Nouel. Currently, it has 29 members that are identified by the letters of the alphabet, from A to Z, and are considered members for life. It also counts with 30 correspondents.

== Members ==
=== Academic members ===
These are the members that belong to the academy for life. Their chairs are identified by the letters of the alphabet.

Chair	Holder	Entry year
A	Jose Rafael Lantigua	2006
B	Andrés L. Mateo	Unknown
C	Ramon Emilio Reyes	2002
CH	Tony Raful	2011
D	Ricardo Miniño Gómez	2003
E	Fabio Guzmán Ariza	2014
F	Bruno Rosario Candelier	1985
G	Pedro Verges	2021
H	Rafael Gonzales Tirado	Unknown
I	Carlos Esteban Deive	Unknown
J	Dennis R. Simó	2007
K	Federico Henríquez Gratereaux	1980
L	Diógenes Céspedes	Unknown
LL	Rafael Peralta Romero	2017
M	Irene Pérez Guerra	1993
N	Marcio Veloz Maggiolo	Unknown
Ñ	Cardinal Nicolás de Jesús López Rodríguez	1989
O	Odalís Pérez Nina	Unknown
P	Manuel Matos Moquete	2000
Q	Manuel Núñez Asencio	2003
R	José Enrique García	2007
S	Ana Margarita Haché	2008
T	Juan José Jimenes Sabater	2007
U	Guillermo Piña-Contreras	2007
V	Franklin Domínguez Hernández	2008
X	José Miguel Soto Jiménez	2011
Z	María José Rincón González	2011
Elected	José Alcántara Almánzar	2010
Elected	Leonel Fernández	2010
Elected	Claudio Cayo Espinal	2018
