= Bioko =

Northern island of Equatorial Guinea, Central Africa

Native name: Ëtulá a Ëri (Bube)
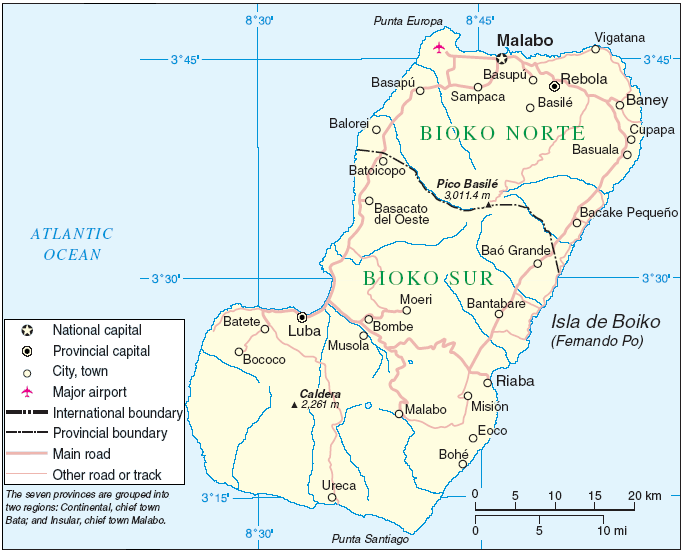
- Map of Bioko

- Location within Equatorial Guinea Location within Africa
- Etymology: Named for Cristino Seriche Bioko

Geography
- Location: Gulf of Guinea
- Coordinates: 3°30′N 8°42′E
- Archipelago: Cameroon line
- Area: 2,017 km^{2} (779 sq mi)
- Length: 70 km (43 mi)
- Width: 32 km (19.9 mi)
- Highest elevation: 3,012 m (9882 ft)
- Highest point: Pico Basile

Administration
- Equatorial Guinea
- Region: Insular Region
- Provinces: Bioko Norte and Bioko Sur
- Largest settlement: Malabo (pop. 297,000 (2019 estimate))

Demographics
- Population: 335,048 (2015 Census)
- Pop. density: 165.8/km^{2} (429.4/sq mi)
- Languages: Equatoguinean Spanish, Pichinglis, Bube
- Ethnic groups: Bubi (58%), Fang (16%), Fernandino (12%), Igbo (7%) (2002)

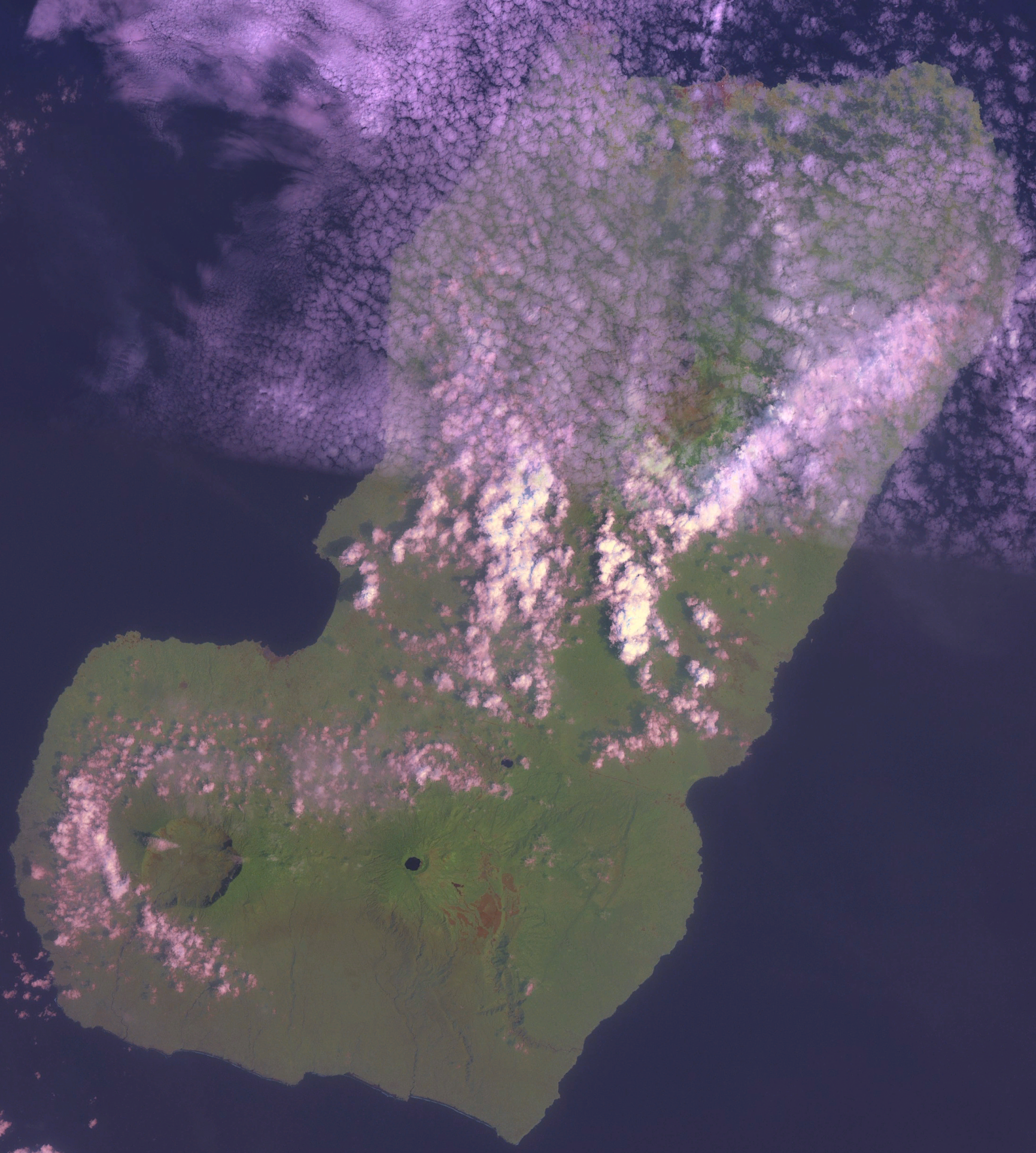
View of Bioko from satellite

Bioko (/biːˈoʊkoʊ/; Spanish: [biˈoko]; Bube: Ëtulá a Ëri; historically known as Fernando Pó, European Portuguese pronunciation: [fɨɾˈnɐ̃.dʊ ˈpɔ]) (Note: Also Fernão do Pó (European Portuguese pronunciation: [fɨɾˈnɐ̃w̃ dʊ ˈpɔ]), or Fernando Poo (Spanish: [feɾˈnan.do ˈpo(.o)])) is an island of Equatorial Guinea. It is located 32 km (20 mi) south of the coast of Cameroon, and 160 km (99 mi) northwest of the northernmost part of mainland Equatorial Guinea. Malabo, on the north coast of the island, is the former capital city of Equatorial Guinea. Bioko's population was 335,048 at the 2015 census and it covers an area of 2,017 km^{2} (779 sq mi), making it the fourth largest island in Africa (after Madagascar, Socotra and Tenerife). The island is part of the Cameroon line of volcanoes and is located off the Cameroon coast, in the Bight of Biafra portion of the Gulf of Guinea. Its geology is volcanic; its highest peak is Pico Basile at 3,012 m (9,882 ft).

== Etymology ==
Bioko's native name is Ëtulá a Ëri in the Bube language. For nearly 500 years, the island was known as Fernando Pó (Portuguese: Fernando Pó; Spanish: Fernando Poo), named for Portuguese navigator Fernão do Pó. Between 1973 and 1979, the island was named Macías Nguema Biyogo after the then-president of Equatorial Guinea. The current name, Bioko, dates from 1979 and is in honour of politician Cristino Seriche Bioko.

== Geography ==
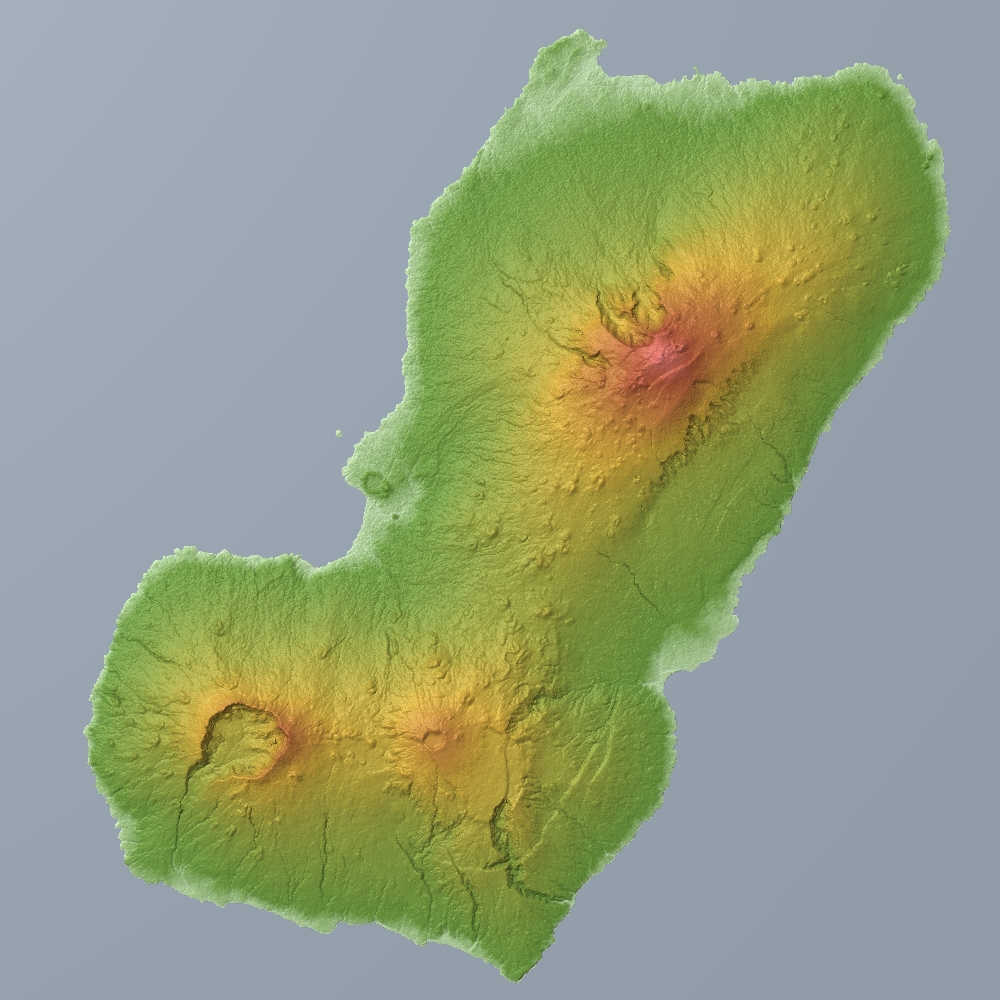
Relief map of Bioko

Bioko lies in the Bight of Biafra on the Gulf of Guinea, about 32 kilometres (20 mi) off Cameroon and roughly 160 kilometres (99 mi) northwest of mainland Equatorial Guinea (Río Muni). The island's area is 2,017 square kilometres (779 sq mi); it is volcanic and mountainous, rising to Pico Basilé (3,011 metres (9,879 ft)).

Bioko has a total area of 2,017 km^{2} (779 sq mi). It is 70 km (43 mi) long from NNE to SSW and about 32 km (20 mi) across. The island is mostly covered by tropical rainforest. It is volcanic and very mountainous, with the highest peak, Pico Basilé, at an elevation of 3,012 m (9,882 ft). It thus resembles neighbouring islands São Tomé and Príncipe. Like them, it lies on the Cameroon line. Its southernmost point is called Punta Santiago.

Bioko lies on the African continental shelf, separated from the African mainland by 32 km (20 mi) of water with a depth of only 60 metres. During the Pleistocene epoch, Bioko was connected to the African mainland. Bioko separated from Africa around 10,000 years ago, at the end of the Last Glacial Period.

The fire skink, a species of lizard found on the island, carries the scientific name of Mochlus fernandi, derived from Fernando Pó, the former name of the island.

=== Geology ===
The island is composed mostly of basalt, mostly alkali basalt and hawaiites, and to a lesser extent mugearites.

== Climate ==
The island shows a strong north-south rainfall gradient driven by relief and the West African monsoon. Mean annual rainfall is ~1,930 millimetres (76 in) at Malabo (north) and ~10,920 millimetres (430 in) at Ureka in the south, among the highest recorded values in Africa. The principal wet season is April-October, with a drier season roughly November-March.

== Protected areas and ecology ==
Two protected areas cover ~40% of the island: Pico Basilé National Park (est. 2000; ~32,256 ha) in the north, and the Luba Crater Scientific Reserve (~51,000 ha) in the south, a Key Biodiversity Area and AZE site centred on Mount Luba and the Gran Caldera.

Bioko forms part of the Cameroon line and hosts lowland Cross–Sanaga–Bioko coastal forests and Mount Cameroon and Bioko montane forests at elevation.

The endemic Pennant's red colobus Piliocolobus pennantii (CR) now persists primarily in southwest Bioko, and the drill Mandrillus leucophaeus (incl. the Bioko drill M. l. poensis) is globally Endangered. Long-term monitoring indicates that illegal bushmeat hunting is the principal threat to Bioko's primates, with tens of thousands of carcasses recorded in Malabo's market over multi-year surveys despite environmental legislation.

== Demographics ==
The island has a population of 335,048 (2015 Census), divided into 2 provinces and 4 districts – Malabo (271,008), Baney (29,366), Luba (26,331), and Riaba (8,343). Its historic indigenous people are the Bubi people, who currently constitute 58% of the population. Other ethnicities include the Fang at 16%, Fernandinos at 12%, and the Igbo at 7%, as well as African and European immigrants.

=== Languages ===
Spanish has been an official language since 1844, when Spain took control of the island. It is still the language of education and administration, reflecting more than 100 years of Spanish colonial rule. 67% of Equatoguineans can speak Spanish, especially those living in the capital, Malabo, on Bioko.

The Bube language, with about 50,000 speakers and various dialects, is the original language of the inhabitants of Bioko. However, given the numerous ethnic groups and peoples who operated on Bioko, a creole language developed, known as Pichi. It is based on English grammar from the period when the British operated bases for their forces. It also incorporates West African languages from Nigeria and Liberia, as well as Portuguese vocabulary, which forms a considerable part of the Krio language, which had developed in Sierra Leone. Workers came to Bioko from all of these areas in the 19th through much of the 20th century.

== History ==
Unlike other islands in the area, Bioko had an indigenous African population. The island was inhabited in the middle of the first millennium BC by Bantu tribes from the mainland, who formed the Bubi ethnic group. The Bubi speak a Bantu language. The island has probably been inhabited by this or other Bantu-speaking groups since before the 7th century BC.

In 1472, the Portuguese navigator Fernão do Pó was the first European to sight the island. He named it Formosa Flora ("beautiful flower"). In 1494, it was renamed Fernando Pó in his honour after the Portuguese claimed it as a colony. The Portuguese developed the island for sugarcane cultivation. Although the sugar was considered of poor quality, the refineries' output was sufficient for Fernando Pó sugar to dominate the trade centers in Europe briefly.

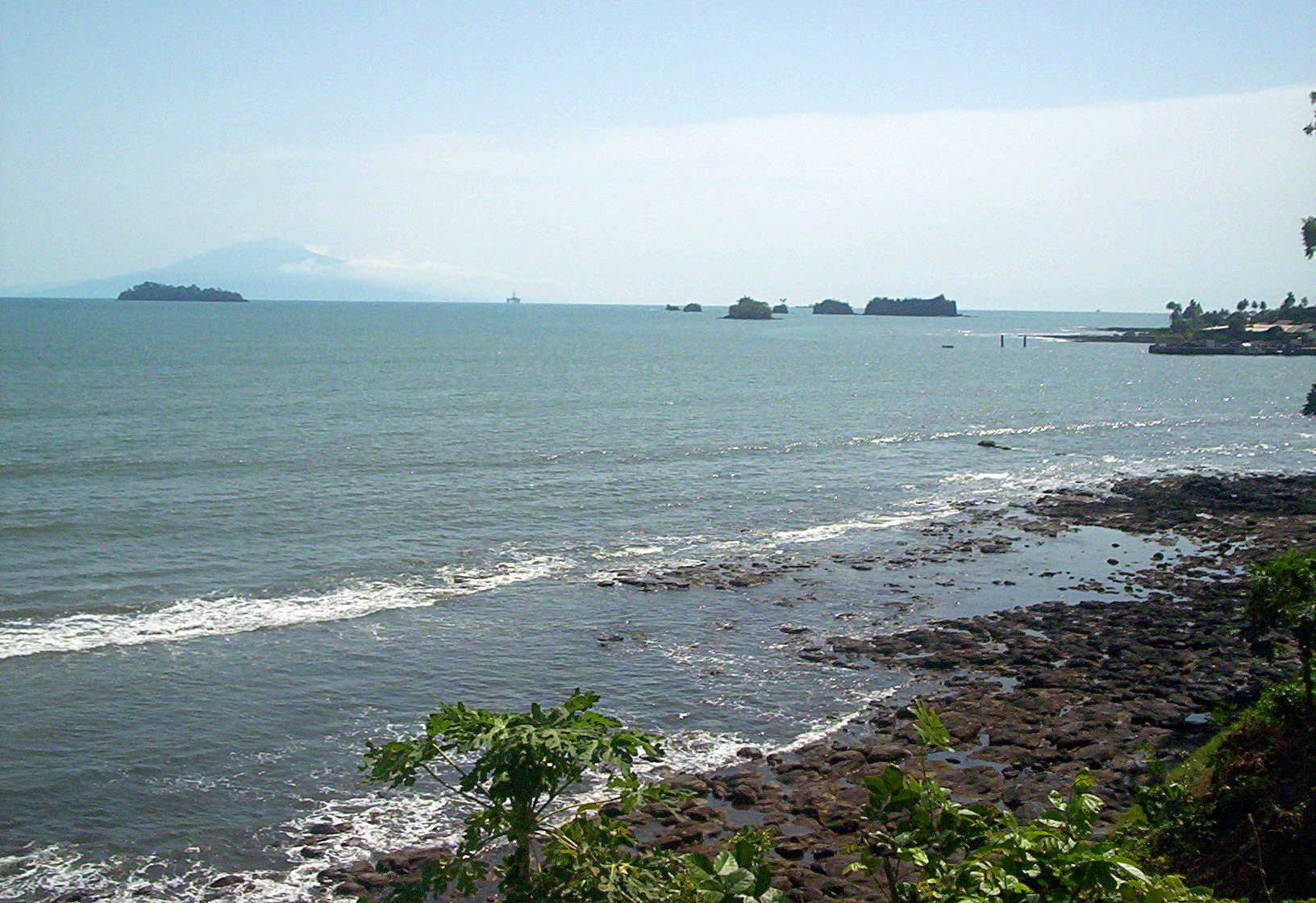
Bioko in the distance from Limbe, Cameroon

In 1642, the Dutch East India Company established trade bases on the island without Portuguese consent. It temporarily centralized from there its slave trade in the Gulf of Guinea. The Portuguese appeared again on the island in 1648, replacing the Dutch Company with one of their own, also dedicated to slave trading and established in its neighbour island Corisco.

In parallel with this establishment, the Bubi clans began the slow process of building the core of a new kingdom on the island, especially through the activities of some local chiefs, such as Molambo (approx. 1700–1760). During a period when enslavement was increasing in the region, local clans abandoned their coastal settlements and settled in the safer hinterland.

Under the 1778 Treaty of El Pardo, Portugal ceded Fernando Po, Annobón, and the Guinea coast, Río Muni, to Spain, which together form modern Equatorial Guinea. The treaty was signed by Queen Mary I of Portugal and King Charles III of Spain, in exchange for territory on the American continent. Spain mounted an expedition to Fernando Po, led by the Conde de Argelejos, who stayed for four months. In October 1778, Spain appointed a governor for the island, who remained until 1780, when the Spanish mission left.

Chief Molambo was succeeded by another local leader, Lorite (1760–1810), who was succeeded by Lopoa (1810–1842). After abolishing the British Atlantic slave trade, the British leased bases at Port Clarence (modern Malabo) and San Carlos for the Preventive Squadron from 1827 to 1843. The settlement at Port Clarence (named after the Duke of Clarence) was constructed under the supervision of William Fitzwilliam Owen. He had previously mapped most of Africa's coasts and was a zealous anti-slaver. During his three-year command, his forces detained 20 ships and liberated 2,500 enslaved people. The Mixed Commission Court was moved from Freetown, Sierra Leone, to Clarence to hasten the legal process of emancipating enslaved people liberated from slave ships.

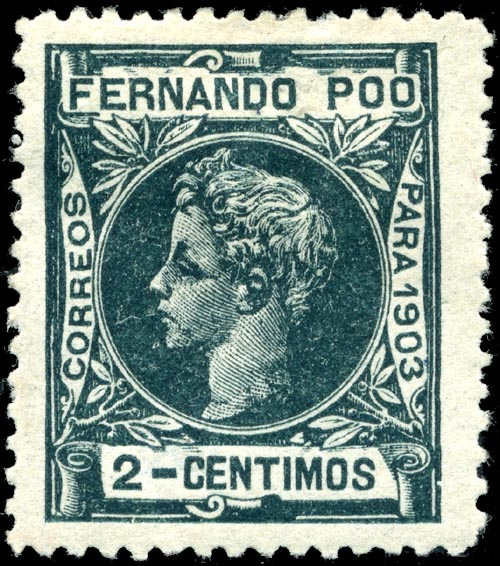
A 1903 postage stamp of Fernando Po

In March 1843, Juan José Lerena planted the Spanish flag in Port Clarence (renamed Santa Isabel), starting the decline of British influence on the island. Spain revoked the British lease in 1855. Madabita (1842–1860) and Sepoko (1860–1875) were principal local chiefs during the period when Spain re-established its control of the island. A notable resident from 1861 to 1865 was the British explorer Richard Burton, who served as the British consul, during which time he wrote several books about Africa. This period was also marked by Spain's deportation of several hundred Afro-Cubans, as well as dozens of Spanish scholars and politicians considered politically undesirable. In addition Spain exiled 218 revolutionaries here from the Philippine Revolution, of whom only 94 survived for long.

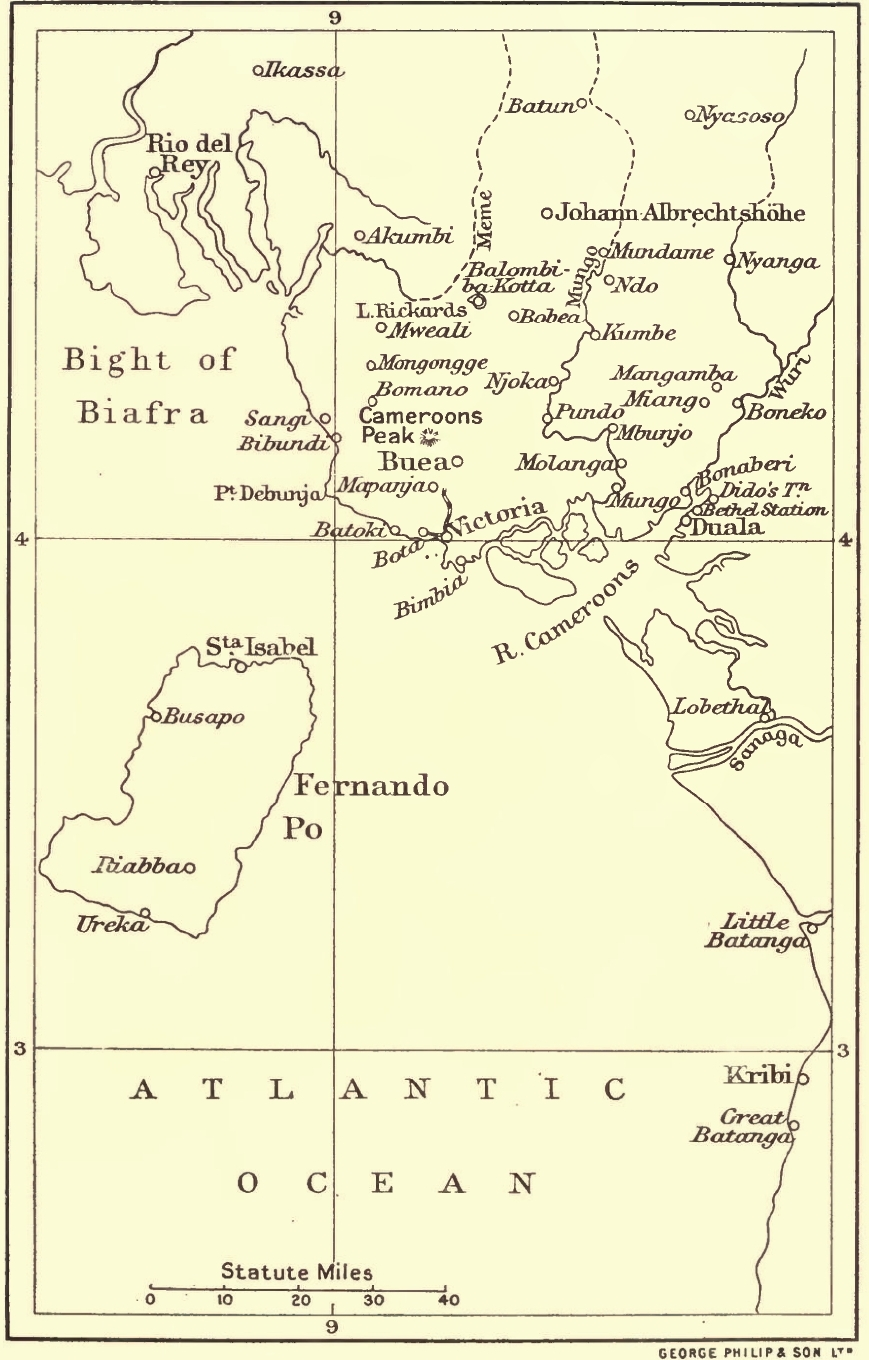
1908 map of Fernando Pó and the coast of Cameroons

In 1923–1930, the League of Nations investigated the transportation of contract migrant labour between Liberia and the Spanish colony of Fernando Po. Although the League concentrated its attention on arrangements in Liberia, a closer examination revealed that labour abuse arose from conditions on Fernando Po. In the last quarter of the 19th century, Krio planters on the island had shifted from palm oil trading to cocoa cultivation. Their dependence on migrant labour and increasing competition with Europeans led to an economic crisis in the early years of the twentieth century. Planters retained labour but failed to pay their contracts, resulting in a situation of de facto slavery. Liberia prohibited labour traders from contracting with its citizens.

In 1942, Fernando Pó was the scene of a small-scale, secret British raid code-named Operation Postmaster, which sought to disrupt German U-boat resupply activities on the island.

During the Nigerian Civil War in the 20th century, relief agencies used the island as one of the bases for Biafran airlift flights into the secessionist Republic of Biafra.

In 2025, the island was designated as a biosphere reserve by UNESCO.

== Economy ==
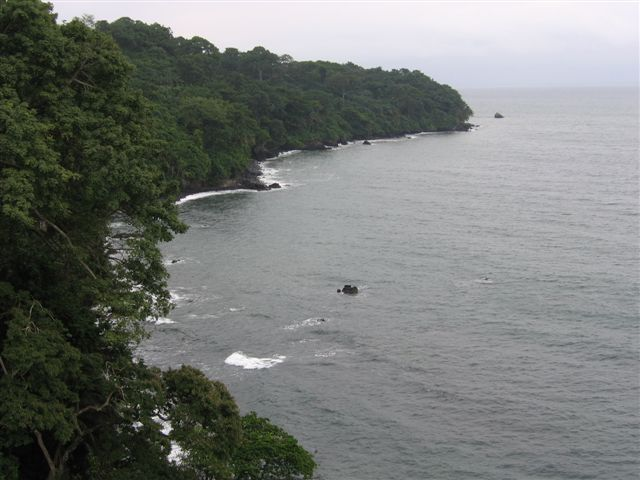
Coastline of Bioko

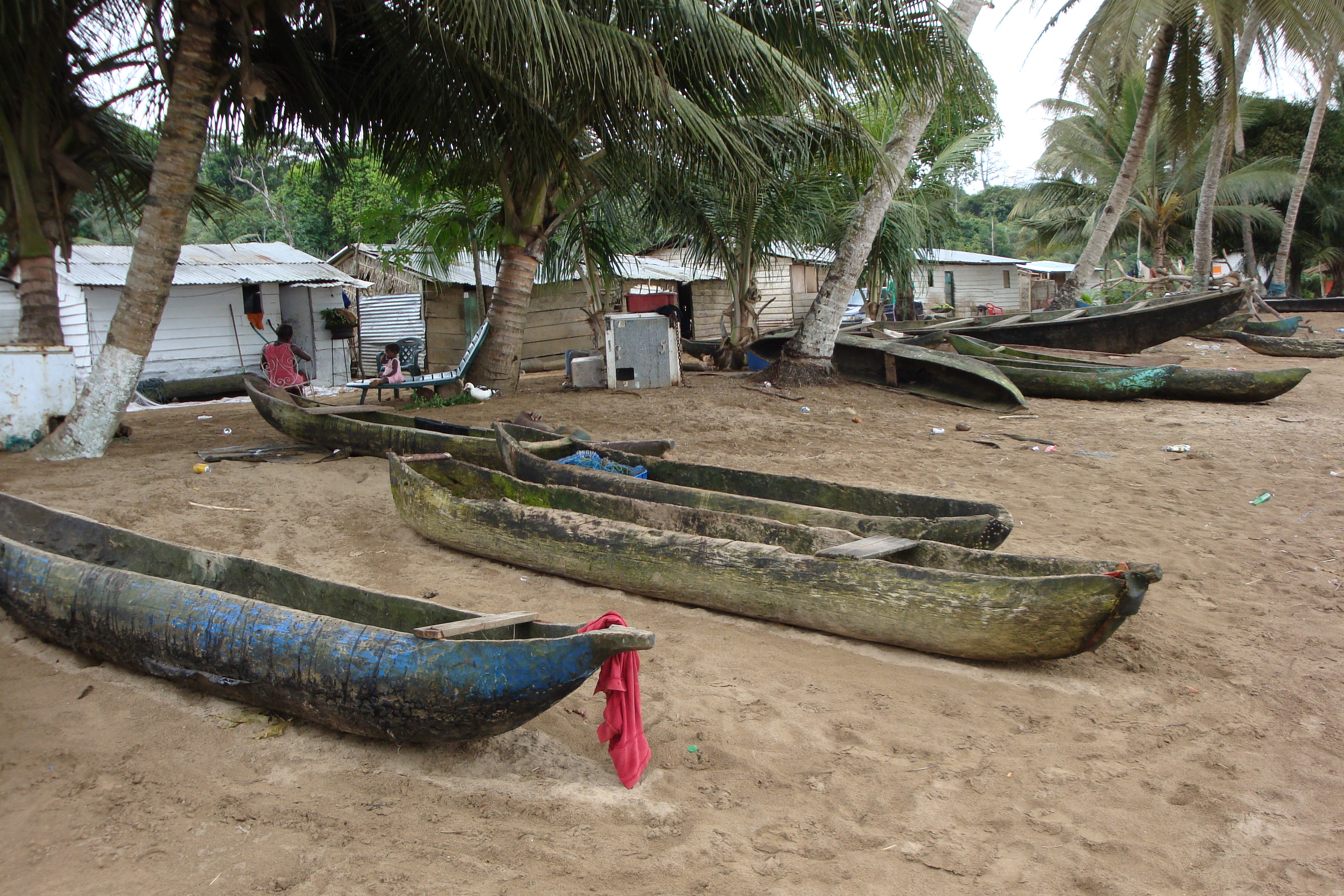
Pirogues on Arena Blanca beach

Located on Punta Europa, west of Malabo, the Alba Gas Plant processes natural gas delivered from offshore production wells. The plant is operated by Marathon Oil Company through its subsidiary, Marathon Equatorial Guinea Production Limited. The plant produces natural gas liquids including propane, butane, and condensate products. The majority of the residue gas from the Alba plant is delivered to a natural gas liquefaction plant operated by EG LNG. A portion of the Alba plant residue is also delivered to the Atlantic Methanol Production Company and is used to produce methanol. The products from all three plants are loaded onto ocean-going tanker ships for export.

=== Transport ===
A rectangular transport route links the four main cities: Malabo, Luba, Baney, and Riaba. The island's airport is Malabo International Airport.

=== Tourism ===
Tourist attractions include the colonial quarter in Malabo, and the southern part of the island, where visitors can hike to the Iladyi Cascades (Moka Falls) and to remote beaches of Ureka to watch nesting turtles.

== See also ==
- Annobón, an island
- Bight of Bonny, also known as the Bight of Biafra
- Bioko drill
- Bioko Norte Province
- Bioko Sur Province
- Cameroon line
- Equatorial Guinea
- Emancipados, black people in Spanish Guinea assimilated with the Spaniards.
- Fernandino peoples
- Fernão do Pó, commander of the first European ship to land here.
- Gulf of Guinea
- Leopold Janikowski, Polish explorer who visited the island in 1883
- Kru people
- Tetteh Quarshie, a Ghanaian who introduced cocoa to his native country from the island.
- Luba Crater Scientific Reserve
- Movement for the Self-Determination of Bioko Island
- The English-lexicon Creole Pichi is spoken on Bioko
- Postage stamps and postal history of Fernando Po
