= Academia Paraguaya de la Lengua Española =

The Academia Paraguaya de la Lengua Española (Spanish for Paraguayan Academy of Language) is an association of academics and experts on the use of the Spanish language in Paraguay. It was founded on June 30, 1927. It is a member of the Association of Spanish Language Academies.
