= Association of Academies of the Spanish Language =

Coordinating body of Spanish language regulators

- Asociación de Academias de la Lengua Española (Spanish)
- Abbreviation: ASALE
- Formation: 1951; 75 years ago
- Headquarters: Madrid, Spain
- Official language: Spanish
- President: Santiago Muñoz Machado
- General Secretary: Francisco Javier Pérez
- Main organ: Permanent commission
- Website: asale.org (in Spanish)

The Association of Academies of the Spanish Language (Spanish: Asociación de Academias de la Lengua Española; ASALE) is an entity whose end is to work for the unity, integrity, and growth of the Spanish language. It was created in Mexico in 1951 and represents the union of all the separate academies in the Spanish-speaking world. The association publishes reference works on the Spanish language and commemorative editions of Hispanic literature, among other publications.

== History ==
Through the initiative of then-president of Mexico Miguel Alemán Valdés, the first congress of academies convened with the purpose of maintaining the integrity of and fostering the further growth of Spanish. The meeting was held from 23 April to 6 May 1951 and resulted in the creation of the association and its permanent commission. The Royal Spanish Academy (Spanish: Real Academia Española or RAE) was not present at the initial meeting but participated in the permanent commission. Ever since the second congress convened in 1956, the RAE has been a regular participant.

In 2000 the association organised the School of Hispanic Lexicography and the Carolina Foundation to promote Spanish lexicography, and together with the RAE, the association earned the Prince of Asturias Award for peace.

An academy for Equatorial Guinea was created in 2013 and joined the association in 2016.

=== Congresses ===
List of Association of Academies of the Spanish Language congresses
Number	Date	City	Territory	Notes
I	23 April – 6 May 1951	Mexico City	Mexico	The RAE was not present
II	22 April – 2 May 1956	Madrid	Spain	
III	27 July – 6 August 1960	Bogotá	Colombia	
IV	30 November – 10 December 1964	Buenos Aires	Argentina	The Cuban delegation did not participate
V	24 July – 19 August 1968	Quito	Ecuador	Delegations from Cuba and Venezuela were not present
VI	20–29 November 1972	Caracas	Venezuela	
VII	13–23 November 1976	Santiago	Chile	Delegations from Cuba and Mexico were not present
VIII	20–27 April 1980	Lima	Peru	The Cuban delegation did not participate
IX	8–15 October 1989	San José	Costa Rica	Delegations from Cuba, Honduras, and Paraguay were not present
X	24–29 April 1994	Madrid	Spain	
XI	15–19 November 1998	Puebla	Mexico	
XII	12–15 November 2002	San Juan	Puerto Rico	
XIII	21–24 March 2007	Medellín	Colombia	
XIV	21–25 November 2011	Panama City	Panama	
XV	23–25 November 2015	Mexico City	Mexico	
XVI	4–8 November 2019	Seville	Spain	
XVII	11–13 November 2024	Quito	Ecuador	

== Works ==
The collaboration between RAE and the other academies was expressed in the coauthorship, since the 22nd edition published in 2001, of the Dictionary of the Spanish Language (Spanish: Diccionario de la Lengua Española), and the 1999 edition of the Orthography (Spanish: Ortografía) was considered a true pan-Hispanic work. Joint projects include the editing of the Grammar (Spanish: Gramática) and the compilation of the Dictionary of Americanisms (Spanish: Diccionario de americanismos).

== Organization ==
The association convenes every four years, led by a Permanent Commission composed of a President (position held by the Director of the Spanish Royal Academy), a Secretary General (one of the directors of the other academies), a Treasurer (chosen by the Spanish Royal Academy), and at least two board members drawn from the associated academies, whose nomination rotate annually. During the Third Congress of Academies, held in Bogotá, Colombia, in 1960, an agreement was reached whereby the governments of countries with a member in the association would be obliged to provide financial support to their respective academies and the greater association.

== Academies ==
Country	Name in Spanish	Name in English	Founded
Spain	Real Academia Española	Royal Spanish Academy	1713
Colombia	Academia Colombiana de la Lengua	Colombian Academy of the Language	1871
Ecuador	Academia Ecuatoriana de la Lengua	Ecuadorian Academy of the Language	1874
Mexico	Academia Mexicana de la Lengua	Mexican Academy of the Language	1875
El Salvador	Academia Salvadoreña de la Lengua	Salvadoran Academy of the Language	1876
Venezuela	Academia Venezolana de la Lengua	Venezuelan Academy of the Language	1883
Chile	Academia Chilena de la Lengua	Chilean Academy of the Language	1885
Peru	Academia Peruana de la Lengua	Peruvian Academy of the Language	1887
Guatemala	Academia Guatemalteca de la Lengua	Guatemalan Academy of the Language	1887
Costa Rica	Academia Costarricense de la Lengua	Costa Rican Academy of the Language	1923
Philippines	Academia Filipina de la Lengua Española	Philippine Academy of the Spanish Language	1924
Panama	Academia Panameña de la Lengua	Panamanian Academy of the Language	1926
Cuba	Academia Cubana de la Lengua	Cuban Academy of the Language	1926
Paraguay	Academia Paraguaya de la Lengua Española	Paraguayan Academy of the Spanish Language	1927
Bolivia	Academia Boliviana de la Lengua	Bolivian Academy of the Language	1927
Dominican Republic	Academia Dominicana de la Lengua	Dominican Academy of the Language	1927
Nicaragua	Academia Nicaragüense de la Lengua	Nicaraguan Academy of the Language	1928
Argentina	Academia Argentina de Letras	Argentine Academy of Letters	1931
Uruguay	Academia Nacional de Letras	National Academy of Letters	1943
Honduras	Academia Hondureña de la Lengua	Honduran Academy of the Language	1949
Puerto Rico	Academia Puertorriqueña de la Lengua Española	Puerto Rican Academy of the Spanish Language	1955
United States	Academia Norteamericana de la Lengua Española	North American Academy of the Spanish Language	1973
Equatorial Guinea	Academia Ecuatoguineana de la Lengua Española	Equatoguinean Academy of the Spanish Language	2013

Although Israelis mainly speak Hebrew, Arabic, English, and Russian, an ASALE conference on Judaeo-Spanish held in 2015 led to plans for the creation of an Israeli branch. A group of academics was founded by ASALE in 2018 and submitted to the government of Israel for recognition. The National Academia of Judaeo-Spanish in Israel will then have the ability to petition to join as a full member, likely in 2019. There are no plans for Andorra, Belize, Gibraltar, or Western Sahara to have their own academies, despite each having a majority Spanish-speaking population either as a first or second language.

== See also ==
- Autoridad Nasionala del Ladino – a defunct Israeli body that regulated Ladino
- Cervantes Institute – a Spanish cultural institution
- Panhispanism – promotion of unity among Spanish speakers
- List of language regulators
- International Conference of the Spanish Language
