= Academia Ecuatoguineana de la Lengua Española =

Equatoguinean language regulator of Spanish

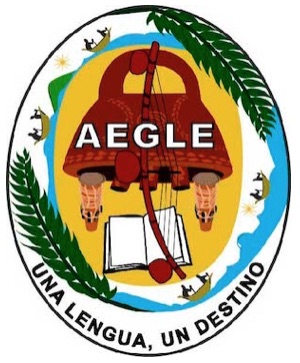

The Equatoguinean Academy of the Spanish Language (Spanish: Academia Ecuatoguineana de la Lengua Española) is an association of academics and experts on the use of the Spanish language in Equatorial Guinea, a republic in Central Africa in which Spanish is the national official language. Equatoguinean Spanish is the particular variety of Spanish spoken in the country. Since 19 March 2016, Equatorial Guinea has been a member of the Association of Spanish Language Academies.

== Context ==
Spanish was the administrative language of the territory of Spanish Guinea before its independence from Spain as the Republic of Equatorial Guinea in 1968. The Constitution of Equatorial Guinea codifies the status of Spanish as a national official language.

Since 2009, Equatorial Guinea has participated in the Ibero-American Summit as an "associate member" in light of its cultural and linguistic connection with the nations of Hispanic America. The country is also a member of the Organization of Ibero-American States since 1979.

== History ==
In 2007, the Real Academia Española invited two academics from the National University of Equatorial Guinea to its international summit with the intent that they serve as representatives of their country to the RAE. In July 2009, the RAE named a further five Equatoguineans as "Academic Correspondents", including artist Leandro Mbomio Nsue, with a stated goal of creating an Equatoguinean Spanish academy in the future.

Subsequently, the institution was officially established in October 2013 by Presidential Decree number 163/2013. It was also announced that the official RAE dictionary of Spanish would, for the first time, include selected words of Equatoguinean origin.

At the international summit of the Association of Spanish Language Academies in Puerto Rico in 2015, the Equatoguinean Academy of the Spanish Language made a formal request to join the association. The admission was finalized in 2016.

== See also ==
- Equatoguinean Spanish
- Equatoguinean literature in Spanish
- Culture of Equatorial Guinea
