= Equatoguinean Spanish =

Spanish variety of Equatorial Guinea

- Español ecuatoguineano
- Pronunciation: [espaˈɲol ekwatoɣineˈano]
- Native speakers: Unknown. 1.1 million total speakers. (2010)
- Language family: Indo-European: Italic; Latino-Faliscan; Latin; Romance; Italo-Western; Western Romance; Gallo-Iberian; Ibero-Romance; West Iberian; Castilian; Spanish; Equatoguinean Spanish
- Early forms: Old Latin: Vulgar Latin; Proto-Romance; Old Spanish; Early Modern Spanish
- Writing system: Latin (Spanish alphabet)

Official status
- Official language in: Equatorial Guinea
- Regulated by: Academia Ecuatoguineana de la Lengua Española

Language codes
- ISO 639-3: –
- Glottolog: span1270
- IETF: es-GQ

Equatoguinean Spanish (Spanish: Español ecuatoguineano) is the variety of Spanish spoken in Equatorial Guinea. This is the only Spanish variety that holds national official status in Sub-Saharan Africa. It is regulated by the Equatoguinean Academy of the Spanish Language and is spoken by about 90% of the population, estimated at 1,170,308 for the year 2010 (though population figures for this country are highly dubious), almost all of them second-language speakers. Spanish is spoken as a native language by a small minority, usually in larger cities.

== History ==
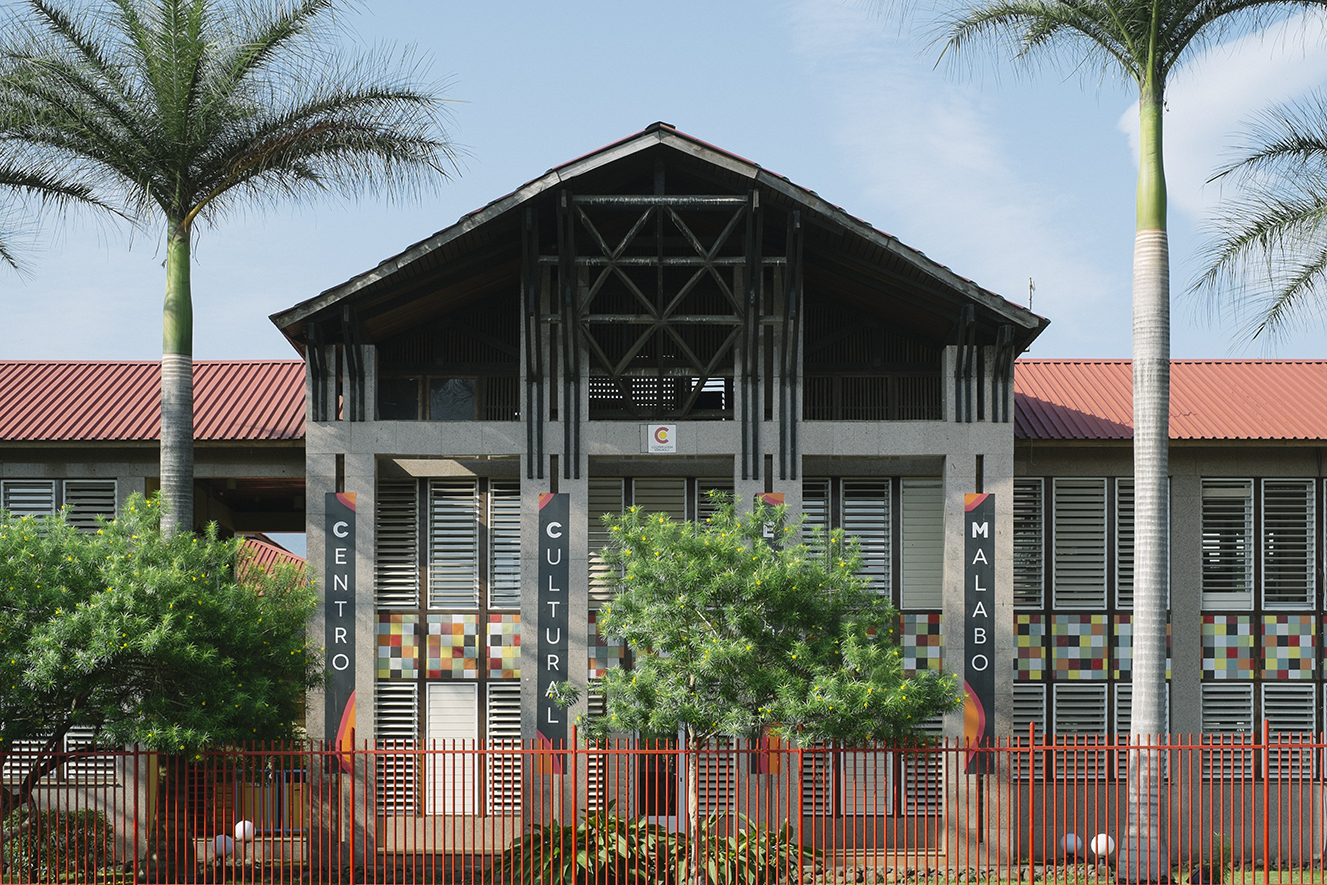
Centro Cultural de España (Cultural Center of Spain) in Malabo

Spanish Guinea (along with the island of Bioko, formerly Fernando Pó) became a Spanish colony after being obtained from Portugal in exchange for American territories in 1778 under the First Treaty of San Ildefonso. Full colonization of the continental interior was not established until the end of the 19th century. The present nation of Equatorial Guinea became independent on 12 October 1968.

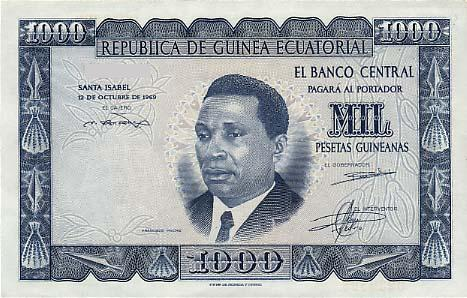
1000 Equatoguinean pesetas banknote from 1969

While the country has maintained its indigenous linguistic diversity, Spanish is the national and official language. Spanish is spoken by about 90% of the population in Bioko and coastal Río Muni and between 60% and 70% in the interior of Río Muni.

== Features ==
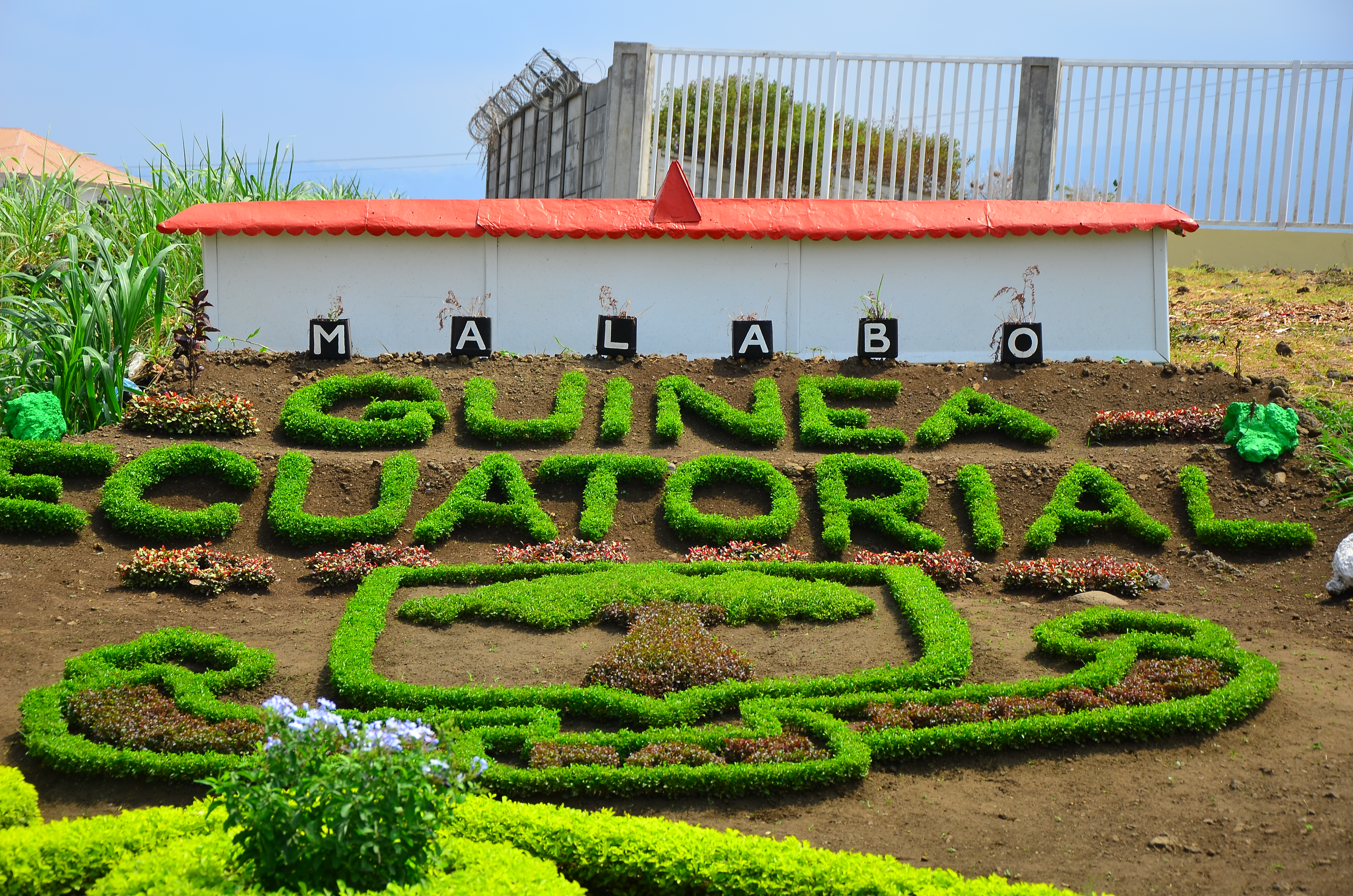
Floral inscription with the name of the country in Spanish in Malabo, Equatorial Guinea

The Spanish spoken in Equatorial Guinea is influenced by Bantu languages. Equatoguinean Spanish is more like Peninsular Spanish than American Spanish dialects. Here are some features of Equatoguinean Spanish:

- Syllable-final /s/ is alveolar [s], rather than the glottal [h] found in southern Spain and much of Latin America.
- Intervocalic /d/ is generally pronounced as a stop [d] or a tap [ɾ]. The fricative/approximant [ð~ð̞] realization found in most other Spanish-speaking countries seldom occurs.
- /ɾ/ and /r/ are merged. The merged phoneme is most commonly realized as [ɾ]; [r] occurs less frequently.
- Like most dialects of Peninsular Spanish, Equatoguinean Spanish has no seseo or ceceo: /θ/ is distinguished from /s/.
- Most of the Bubi ethnic group pronounce the "r" in the guttural form [ʀ], like the sound of the initial "r" in French.
- Syllable-final /ɾ/ and /l/ are generally distinguished despite the native Bantu languages having no such distinction. Both phonemes are very occasionally elided in word-final position.
- Word-final /n/ is rarely velarized to [ŋ].
- Articles are omitted.
- The pronoun usted can be used with the tú verbal conjugation.
- There is no distinction between indicative and subjunctive moods.
- Vosotros is used interchangeably with ustedes.
- The preposition en replaces a to mark a destination: voy en Bata instead of voy a Bata.

== Comparison to Caribbean Spanish ==
According to John Lipski, a comparison between the Spanish spoken in Equatorial Guinea and Caribbean Spanish does not hint at an influence of African languages in Caribbean Spanish, despite some earlier theories. Both varieties of Spanish are noticeably different. The main influence on the Spanish spoken in Equatorial Guinea seems to be the varieties spoken by native Spanish colonists. In a different paper, however, Lipski notes that the phonotactics of African languages might have reinforced, in Caribbean Spanish, the consonant reduction that was already taking place in Spanish from Southern Spain.

== See also ==
- Equatoguinean literature in Spanish
- Pichinglis (Fernando Po Creole English)
- Saharan Spanish
- Equatoguinean Portuguese
