= San Antonio de Ureca =

- Village
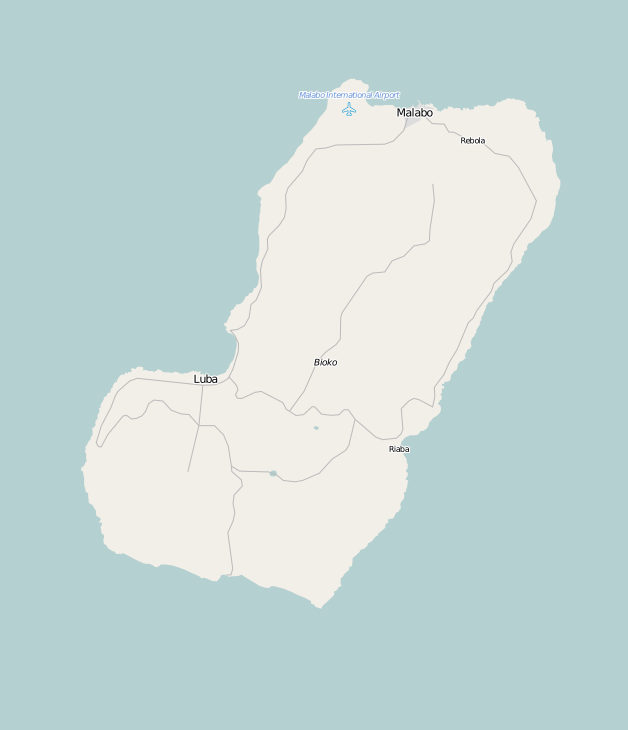
- Location in Bioko San Antonio de Ureca (Equatorial Guinea)
- Coordinates: 3°16′N 8°31′E
- Country: Equatorial Guinea
- Province: Bioko Sur
- Elevation: 186 m (610 ft)
- Time zone: UTC+1 (WAT)
- Climate: Af

San Antonio de Ureca, also known as Ureka or Ureca, is a village in Bioko Sur, Equatorial Guinea, south of Malabo on the island of Bioko. The town of Ureka is included among the wettest areas in the world; it receives about 10,450 millimeters (418 ins) of rainfall annually. It is the wettest place in Africa.

== Climate ==
This region on Bioko Island is the wettest place on the African continent. During the drier season from November to March, tourists flock to see marine turtles come ashore and lay eggs. Annual rainfall averages 10,450 millimetres or 410 inches.

Climate data for San Antonio de Ureca
Month	Jan	Feb	Mar	Apr	May	Jun	Jul	Aug	Sep	Oct	Nov	Dec	Year
Average rainfall mm (inches)	206 (8.1)	129 (5.1)	293 (11.5)	243 (9.6)	962 (37.9)	2,032 (80.0)	2,205 (86.8)	1,867 (73.5)	1,348 (53.1)	560 (22.0)	410 (16.1)	191 (7.5)	10,446 (411.2)
