= Rioplatense Spanish =

Variety of Spanish language

- Argentine–Uruguayan Spanish
- Castellano rioplatense (Castellano argentino-uruguayo)
- Pronunciation: [kasteˈʃano rjoplaˈtense]
- Native to: Argentina, Uruguay
- Ethnicity: Argentines; Uruguayans
- Language family: Indo-European: Italic; Latino-Faliscan; Romance; Italo-Western; Western; Ibero-Romance; West Iberian; Castilian; Spanish; Rioplatense Spanish
- Early forms: Proto-Indo-European: Proto-Italic; Old Latin; Vulgar Latin; Proto-Romance; Old Spanish; Early Modern Spanish
- Dialects: Outer Dialects: Norteño (Northern); Guaranítico (Northeastern); Cuyano (Western); Cordobés (Central); Inner Dialects: Litoraleño (Coastal); Bonaerense (Eastern); Patagónico (Southern); Uruguayan
- Writing system: Latin (Spanish alphabet)

Official status
- Regulated by: Academia Argentina de Letras; Academia Nacional de Letras de Uruguay

Language codes
- ISO 639-1: es
- ISO 639-2: spa
- ISO 639-3: –
- Glottolog: None
- IETF: es-AR es-UY
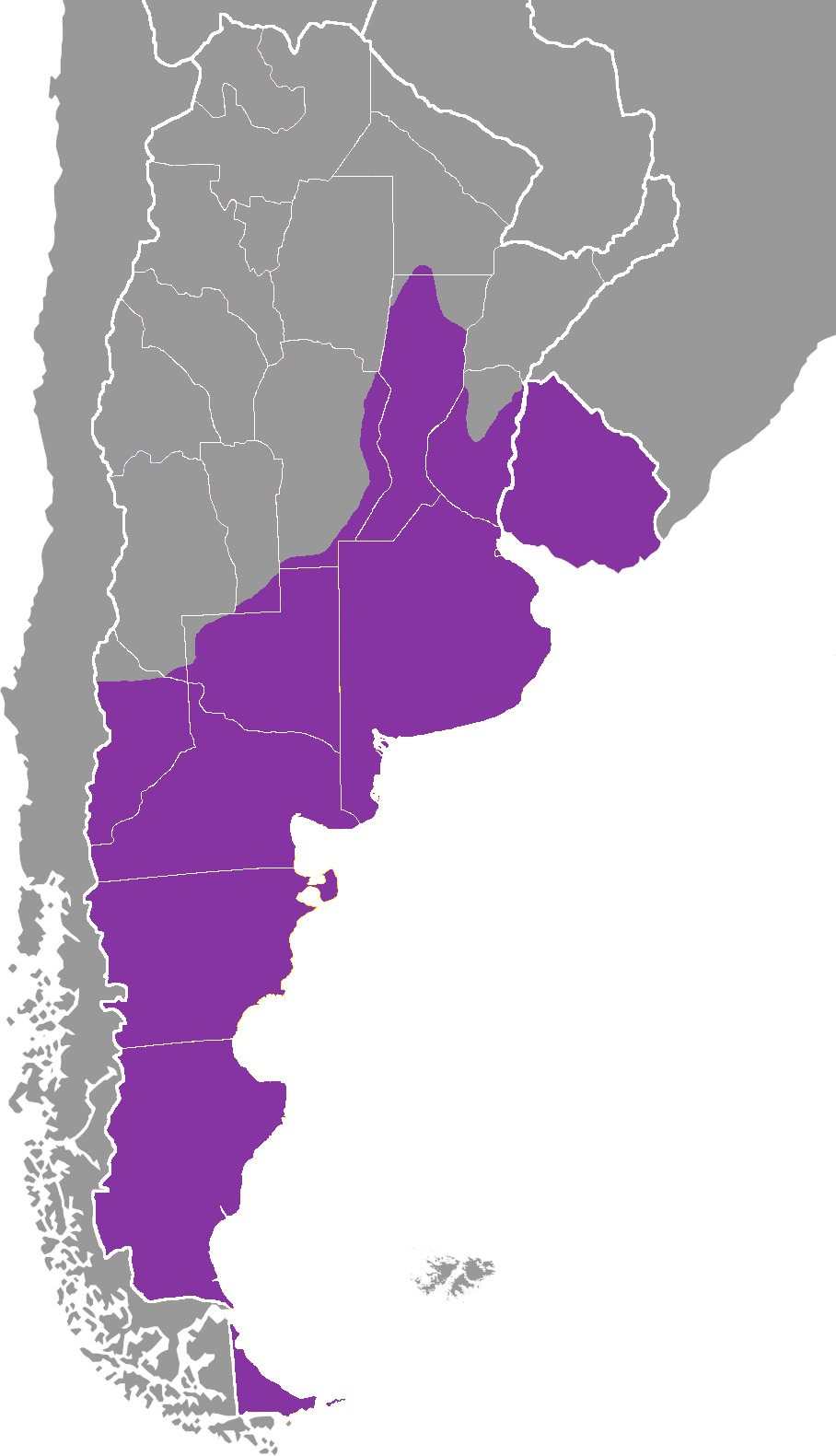
- Rioplatense Spanish-speaking regions, including Patagonian variants

Rioplatense Spanish (/ˌriːoʊpləˈtɛnseɪ/ REE-oh-plə-TEN-say; Spanish: [ˌrioplaˈtense]), also known as Rioplatense Castilian or River Plate Spanish, is a variety of Spanish originating in and around the Río de la Plata Basin, and now spoken throughout most of Argentina and Uruguay. This dialect is widely recognized throughout the Hispanosphere due to its strong influence from Italian languages, a result of significant historical Italian immigration to the region. As a consequence, it has incorporated numerous Italian loanwords—giving rise to the lunfardo argot—and is spoken with an intonation similar to that of the Neapolitan language from Southern Italy.

It is the most prominent dialect to employ voseo (the use of vos in place of the pronoun tú, along with special accompanying conjugations) in both speech and writing. Many features of Rioplatense Spanish are also shared with the varieties spoken in south and eastern Bolivia, as well as in Paraguay, particularly in regions bordering Argentina. It also strongly influences the fronteiriço, a pidgin spoken in Uruguay's border regions with Brazil, as a result of continuous interaction between the communities of both nations.

As Rioplatense is considered a dialect of Spanish and not a distinct language, there are no credible figures for a total number of speakers. The total population of these areas would amount to some 25–30 million, depending on the definition and expanse.

== Location ==
Rioplatense is the predominant Spanish variety spoken in both Argentina and Uruguay. In the former, it is primarily centered in major urban areas such as Buenos Aires, Rosario, Santa Fe, La Plata, Mar del Plata and Bahía Blanca—along with their surrounding suburbs and the regions connecting them, whereas in the latter, it is spoken nationwide, where it takes the form of Uruguayan Spanish.

Beyond these core areas, Rioplatense Spanish extends to regions that, while not geographically adjacent, have been culturally influenced by these linguistic centers, including parts of Paraguay and the border regions of Brazil and Uruguay. It serves as the linguistic standard in audiovisual media across both Argentina and Uruguay.

== History ==
The Spanish language was introduced to the region during the colonial era. The Río de la Plata Basin, which originally formed part of the Viceroyalty of Peru, was granted its own status as the Viceroyalty of the Río de la Plata in 1776. Following the independence of both nations in the first half of the 19th century, the language spoken in the area—criollo Spanish—was largely unaffected by external linguistic influences and varied primarily due to regionalisms.

From the 1870s until the mid-1960s, large waves of European immigrants, primarily from Italy and Spain, began to arrive in Uruguay and Argentina. As a result, the ethnic and cultural composition of both countries, which were in the process of consolidating as nation-states, was profoundly influenced by the cultures of the new arrivals. The language adopted various features from the native languages of these immigrants, such as Neapolitan and Sicilian, which played a significant role in shaping Rioplatense.

=== European immigration ===
Several languages, especially Italian, influenced the historical criollo Spanish of the region because of the diversity of the settlers and immigrants to Argentina and Uruguay:

- 1870–1890: mainly Northern Italian, Spanish, Basque, and Galician speakers, with some others from France, Germany, and more European countries.
- 1910–1945: again from Spain, Southern Italy, Portugal and, in smaller numbers, from across the remainder of Europe; Jewish immigration—mainly from Russian Empire and Poland from the 1910s until after World War II—was also significant.
- English and Welsh speakers were not as numerous, but made up a substantial number as well, with many Welshmen setting up colonies that still stand to this day.

=== Influence of indigenous populations ===
Due to the disappearance of the indigenous population in Uruguay during the early years of the country as an independent state and the absence of a lasting cultural legacy from these peoples, there was no significant influence of native languages on Uruguayan Spanish. In contrast, in Argentina, there was a strong interaction with the languages of the indigenous peoples of the northern regions. Therefore, words from Guarani, Quechua, and other indigenous languages were incorporated into the local form of Spanish, and then spread.

Some words of Amerindian origin commonly used in Rioplatense Spanish are:

- From Quechua:
  - guacho or guacha (orig. wakcha 'poor person, vagabond, orphan'); the term for the native cowboys of the Pampas, gaucho, may be related.
  - choclo/pochoclo (pop + choclo, from chuqllu, 'corn') – "popcorn" in Argentina
- From Guaraní: pororó – 'popcorn' in Uruguay, Paraguay and some Argentine provinces.

== Linguistic features ==
=== Phonology ===
Rioplatense Spanish distinguishes itself from other dialects of Spanish by the pronunciation of certain consonants.

Consonant phonemes
	Labial		Denti-alveolar		Palatal	Velar	
Nasal	m		n		ɲ		
Stop	p	b	t	d	tʃ	k	ɡ
Continuant	f	b	s	d	ʃ ~ ʒ	x	ɡ
Lateral			l				
Flap			ɾ				
Trill			r				

- Like many other dialects, Rioplatense features yeísmo: the sounds represented by ll (historically the palatal lateral /ʎ/) and y (historically the palatal approximant /ʝ/) have fused into one. Thus, in Rioplatense, se cayó "he fell down" is homophonous with se calló "he became silent". This merged phoneme is generally pronounced as a postalveolar fricative, either voiced [ʒ] (as in English measure or the French j) in the central and western parts of the dialect region (this phenomenon is called zheísmo) or voiceless [ʃ] (as in English shine or the French ch), a phenomenon called sheísmo that originated in and around Buenos Aires but has expanded to the rest of Argentina and Uruguay. Both Porteños (those from Buenos Aires) and Montevideans perceive those speaking with sheísmo as originating from their own country and those speaking with zheísmo originating from the opposite country, despite the fact that sheísmo is common in both.
- As in most American dialects, also, Rioplatense Spanish has seseo (/θ/ and /s/ are not distinguished, both being pronounced as [s]). Thus, casa ("house") is homophonous with caza ("hunt"). Seseo is common to other dialects of Spanish in the Americas, Canarian Spanish and Andalusian Spanish.
- In popular speech, the fricative /s/ has a very strong tendency to become "aspirated" before another consonant or a pause. (The resulting sound depends on what the following consonant is, although describing it as a voiceless glottal fricative, [h], would give a clear idea of the mechanism.) /s/ may also be aspirated at the end of a word preceding another word that begins in a vowel, though this is less common. Such word-final intervocalic /s/-aspiration is most frequent in northern Argentina. For example, esto es lo mismo "this is the same" is commonly pronounced something like [ˈehto ˈeh lo ˈmihmo], but in las águilas azules "the blue eagles", the final /s/ in las and águilas might stay [s], as no consonant follows ([las ˈaɣilas aˈsuleh]), though it might still be aspirated as well ([lah ˈaɣilah aˈsuleh]).
- The phoneme /x/ (written as ⟨g⟩ before ⟨e⟩ or ⟨i⟩, and as ⟨j⟩ elsewhere) is never glottalized to [h] in the Atlantic coast. That phenomenon is common to other coastal dialects in Hispanic American Spanish, but not the Rioplatense dialect. Rioplatense speakers always realize it as [x].
- Weakening the final /s/ before consonants through aspiration is the norm. However, this elision may be seen as a feature of uneducated speakers. In some contexts—when singing, for example—the level of aspiration may vary. Some speakers may also drop the final /ɾ/ sound in verb infinitives.
- Many Argentinians merge /ɲ/ into /nj/, meaning that huraño "unsociable" and uranio "uranium" are pronounced the same.
- [v] is a relatively common allophone of /b/. Some speakers employ it in emphatic pronunciation, especially when pronouncing words spelled with ⟨v⟩.

In Rioplatense Spanish, syllable-final /s/ is almost invariably aspirated to [h] before a following consonant. Among speakers from lower socioeconomic backgrounds, this aspiration—often culminating in deletion—extends to all coda environments, including before vowels and at utterance-final pause. Frequent deletion of word-final /ɾ/ in the same speech style further simplifies codas and favours a consonant–vowel (CV) rhythmic pattern in rapid informal speech.

Si querés irte, andate. Yo no te voy a parar.
"If you want to go, then go. I'm not going to stop you."
IPA [si keˈɾe ˈite anˈdate | ˈʃo no te ˈβoj a paˈɾa]

=== Intonation ===
Rioplatense Spanish, especially the speech of all of Uruguay and the Buenos Aires area in Argentina, has intonation patterns that resemble those of Italian dialects. This correlates well with immigration patterns, since both Argentina and Uruguay have received large numbers of Italian settlers since the 19th century.

According to a study conducted by National Scientific and Technical Research Council of Argentina, Buenos Aires and Rosario residents speak with an intonation most closely resembling Neapolitan. The researchers note this as a relatively recent phenomenon, starting in the beginning of the 20th century with the main wave of Southern Italian immigration. Before that, the porteño accent was more like that of Spain, especially Andalusia, and in case of Uruguay, the accent was more like the Canarian dialect.

=== Pronouns and verb conjugation ===
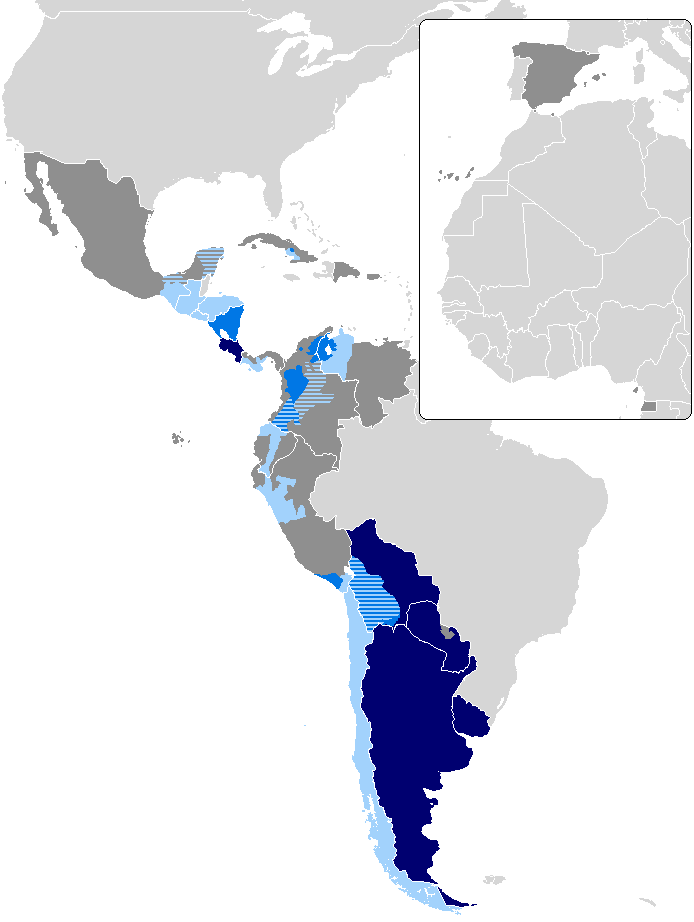
Voseo countries – Argentina, Uruguay, Paraguay and Eastern Bolivia (Media Luna) – are represented by dark blue. Argentina is the largest country that uses the voseo.

One of the features of the Argentine and Uruguayan speaking style is the voseo: the usage of the pronoun vos for the second person singular, instead of tú. In other Spanish-speaking regions where voseo is used, such as in Chile and Colombia, the use of voseo has at times been considered a nonstandard lower speaking style, whereas in Argentina and Uruguay it is standard.

The second person plural pronoun, which is vosotros in Spain, is replaced with ustedes in Rioplatense, as in most other Hispanic American dialects. While usted is the formal second person singular pronoun, its plural ustedes has a neutral connotation and can be used to address friends and acquaintances as well as in more formal occasions (see T–V distinction). Ustedes takes a grammatically third-person plural verb.

As an example, see the conjugation table for the verb amar (to love) in the present tense, indicative mode:

Inflection of amar
Person/Number	Peninsular	Rioplatense
1st sing.	yo amo	yo amo
2nd sing.	tú amas	vos amás
3rd sing.	él ama	él ama
1st plural	nosotros amamos	nosotros amamos
2nd plural	vosotros amáis	ustedes aman (Note: Ustedes is used throughout most of Hispanic America for both the familiar and formal. In Spain, outside of Canary Islands and Andalusia, it is used only in formal speech for the second person plural.)
3rd plural	ellos aman	ellos aman

Although apparently there is just a stress shift (from amas to amás), the origin of such a stress is the loss of the diphthong of the classical vos inflection from vos amáis to vos amás. This can be better seen with the verb "to be": from vos sois to vos sos. In vowel-alternating verbs like perder and morir, the stress shift also triggers a change of the vowel in the root:

Inflection of perder
Peninsular	Rioplatense
yo pierdo	yo pierdo
tú pierdes	vos perdés
él pierde	él pierde
nosotros perdemos	nosotros perdemos
vosotros perdéis	ustedes pierden
ellos pierden	ellos pierden

For the -ir verbs, the Peninsular vosotros forms end in -ís, so there is no diphthong to simplify, and Rioplatense vos employs the same form: instead of tú vives, vos vivís; instead of tú vienes, vos venís (note the alternation).

Selected conjugation differences in present indicative
Verb	Standard Spanish	Castilian in plural	Rioplatense	Chilean	Maracaibo Voseo	English (US/UK)
Cantar	tú cantas	vosotros cantáis	vos cantás	tú cantái	vos cantáis	you sing
Correr	tú corres	vosotros corréis	vos corrés	tú corrí	vos corréis	you run
Partir	tú partes	vosotros partís	vos partís	tú partí	vos partís	you leave
Decir	tú dices	vosotros decís	vos decís	tú decí	vos decís	you say

The imperative forms for vos is formed by dropping the final -r from the infinitive and stressing the last syllable. Thus the form is identical to stressing the last syllable of all regular imperative forms in Peninsular:

- Hablá más fuerte, por favor. "Speak louder, please" (habla in Peninsular)
- Comé un poco de torta. "Eat some cake" (come in Peninsular)

However, irregular verbs in Peninsular are not identical except for stress:

- Vení para acá. "Come over here" (ven in Peninsular)
- Hacé lo que te dije. "Do what I told you" (haz in Peninsular)

The verb ir (to go) is not used in this form except for the Argentine province of Tucumán, where it's conjugated ite. The corresponding form of the verb andar (to walk, to go) substitutes for it.

- Andá para allá. "Go there" (ve in Peninsular)

The plural imperative uses the ustedes form (i. e. the third person plural subjunctive, as corresponding to ellos).

As for the subjunctive forms of vos verbs, while they tend to take the tú conjugation, some speakers do use the classical vos conjugation, employing the vosotros form minus the i in the final diphthong. Many consider only the tú subjunctive forms to be correct.

- Espero que veas or Espero que veás "I hope that you see..." (Peninsular vosotros veáis)
- Lo que quieras or (less used) Lo que quierás/querás "Whatever you want" (Peninsular vosotros queráis)

In the preterite, an s is sometimes added, for instance (vos) perdistes. While this corresponds to the classical vos conjugation found in literature (compare Iberian Spanish form vosotros perdisteis) and is more common in varieties that use vos, this is more likely the result of analogy, as the 2nd person singular conjugation in every other verb tense ends in -s.

Other verb forms coincide with tú after the i is omitted (the vos forms are the same as tú).

- Si salieras "If you went out" (Peninsular salierais)

Other Conjugation Differences
Standard Spanish	Rioplatense / other Argentine	Chilean	Maracaibo Voseo	Castilian in plural	English (US/UK)
lo que quieras	lo que quieras/querás	lo que querái	lo que queráis		whatever you want
espero que veas	espero que veas/veás	espero que veái	espero que veáis		I hope you can see
no lo toques	no lo toqués	no lo toquís	no lo toquéis		don't touch it
si salieras		si salierai	si salierais		if you went out
si amaras		si amarai	si amarais		if you loved
vivías		vivíai	vivíais		you lived
cantabas		cantabai	cantabais		you sang
dirías		diríai	diríais		you'd say
harías		haríai	haríais		you'd do

==== Usage ====
In the old times, vos was used as a respectful term. In Rioplatense, as in most other dialects which employ voseo, this pronoun has become informal, supplanting the use of tú (compare you in English, which used to be formal singular but has supplanted the former informal singular pronoun thou). It is used especially for addressing friends and family members (regardless of age), but may also include most acquaintances, such as co-workers, friends of one's friends, etc.

=== Usage of tenses ===
Although literary works use the full spectrum of verb inflections, in Rioplatense (as well as many other Spanish dialects), the future tense tends to use a verbal phrase (periphrasis) in the informal language.

This verb phrase is formed by the verb ir ("to go") followed by the preposition a ("to") and the main verb in the infinitive. This resembles the English phrase to be going to + infinitive verb. For example:

- Creo que descansaré un poco → Creo que voy a descansar un poco (I think I will rest a little → I think I am going to rest a little)
- Mañana me visitará mi madre → Mañana me va a visitar mi madre (Tomorrow my mother will visit me → Tomorrow my mother is going to visit me)
- La visitaré mañana → La voy a visitar mañana (I will visit her tomorrow → I am going to visit her tomorrow)

The present perfect (Spanish: Pretérito perfecto compuesto), just like pretérito anterior, is rarely used: the simple past replaces it. However, the Present Perfect is still used in Northwestern Argentina, particularly in the province of Tucumán.

- Juan no ha llegado todavía → Juan no llegó todavía (Juan has not arrived yet → Juan did not arrive yet)
- El torneo ha comenzado → El torneo empezó (The tournament has begun → The tournament began)
- Ellas no han votado → Ellas no votaron (They have not voted → They did not vote)

But, in the subjunctive mood, the present perfect is still widely used:

- No creo que lo hayan visto ya (I don't believe they have already seen him)
- Espero que lo hayas hecho ayer (I hope you did it yesterday)

In Buenos Aires a reflexive form of verbs is often used – "se viene" instead of "viene'', etc.

== Influence beyond Argentina ==
In Chilean Spanish there is plenty of lexical influence from the Argentine dialects suggesting a possible "masked prestige" otherwise not expressed, since the image of Argentine things is usually negative. Influences run across the different social strata of Chile. Argentine tourism in Chile during summer and Chilean tourism in Argentina would influence the speech of the upper class. The middle classes would have Argentine influences by watching football on cable television and by watching Argentine programs in the broadcast television. La Cuarta, a "popular" tabloid, regularly employs lunfardo words and expressions. Usually Chileans do not recognize the Argentine borrowings as such, claiming they are Chilean terms and expressions. The relation between Argentine dialects and Chilean Spanish is one of "asymmetric permeability", with Chilean Spanish adopting sayings of the Argentine variants but usually not the other way around. Despite this, people in Santiago, Chile, value Argentine Spanish poorly in terms of "correctness", far behind Peruvian Spanish, which is considered the most correct form.

Some Argentine words have been adopted in Iberian Spanish such as pibe, piba "boy, girl", taken into Spanish slang where it produced pibón, "very attractive person".

== See also ==
- Diccionario de argentinismos (book)
- Immigration to Argentina
- Immigration to Uruguay
- Lunfardo, Buenos Aires slang argot
  - Vesre, reversing the order of syllables within a word
- Names given to the Spanish language
- Cocoliche, a pidgin of Italian and Spanish formerly spoken by Italians in Greater Buenos Aires.
- South American Spanish
- Spanish dialects and varieties
- Voseo
