= The Making of Asian America: A History =

2015 book by Erika Lee

- Author: Erika Lee
- Genre: History, Asian American history
- Publisher: Simon & Schuster
- Publication date: September 1, 2015
- Pages: 560
- ISBN: 978-1476739410
- Preceded by: Angel Island: Immigrant Gateway to America
- Followed by: America for Americans: A History of Xenophobia in the United States

The Making of Asian America: A History is a 2015 non-fiction book by Erika Lee, a history professor at Harvard University. At the time of publication, Lee was the director of the Immigration History Research Center at the University of Minnesota. The book concerns and investigates the history of several generations of Asian American immigrants and descendants, as well as the changing nature of Asian American life throughout several centuries. It was awarded an Asian/Pacific American Award for Literature in Adult Non-Fiction by the Asian Pacific American Librarians Association in 2015.

== Synopsis ==
The book covers a broad range of time regarding Asian Americans across five parts.

The first part, titled "Beginnings: Asians in the Americas", concerns the arrival of Filipino sailors and coolies to Latin America in the sixteenth century.

The second part, titled "The Making of Asian America During the Age of Mass Migration and Asian Exclusion", covers the experiences of various diasporic immigrants, such as Chinese Americans, Japanese Americans, and Korean Americans, as they contended with exclusionary policies like the Chinese Exclusion Act in the nineteenth and twentieth centuries.

The third part, titled "Asian America in a World at War", addresses the lived experiences of Japanese Americans during World War II as well as those of various Asian Americans during the Cold War.

The fourth part, titled "Remaking Asian America in a Globalized World", talks about Southeast Asian immigrants in the United States, with a chapter dedicated to Hmong Americans, while also considering the state of activism and globalization in the last few decades.

The fifth part, titled "Twenty-first-Century Asian Americans", contends with the current reality of Asian American life, while the epilogue reflects on the contributions which Asian Americans have made to their own livelihoods throughout history, as well as their overall effect on America.

== Critical reception ==
Kirkus Reviews granted the book a star and included it in their list of Best Books for 2015, stating that it was "A powerful, timely story told with method and dignity." Publishers Weekly called it an "ambitious, sweeping, and insightful survey." The New York Times considered it "a useful and important upgrade" to the canon of Asian American history established by predecessors like Ronald Takaki "by broadening the scope and, at times, deepening the investigations", after which it was included in an Editor's Choice segment. In the Los Angeles Times, Pulitzer Prize for Fiction–winning author Viet Thanh Nguyen called the book a "monumental work" and commended Lee for emphasizing "not only the national dimension of Asian American experiences but also their transnational contexts." According to MinnPost, the book was lauded by Asian Americans in the Minneapolis–Saint Paul metropolitan area for her decision to include sections about Southeast Asian immigrants in Minnesota. Meanwhile, The Dallas Morning News admired Lee's clear and well-researched prose on the complicated subject of Asian American history but lamented the relative underrepresentation of Pacific Islander Americans in her book's sections.
