= Manuel Pérez y Curis =

Uruguayan poet

- Born: May 21, 1884; Montevideo, Uruguay
- Died: November 22, 1920 (aged 36); Montevideo, Uruguay
- Occupations: Poet, writer, publisher
- Spouse: Josefina Maggi
- Children: Apolo, Minerva, Mercurio, Orfeo, Febo, Mireya

Manuel Pérez y Curis (May 21, 1884 – November 22, 1920) was a Uruguayan poet, born in Montevideo, Uruguay.

== Biography ==
Pérez y Curis was the son of Julián Pérez Rial and Manuela Curis.

Apolo magazine, which appeared monthly and contained articles on art and sociology, is the main source of his written work. his main written work. Another important work is La arquitectura del verso (The Architecture of the Verse) (1913), published in France and in Mexico; the writing secretary was Ovidio Fernández Ríos.

The critic and essayist Alberto Zum Felde published in this magazine La Hiperbórea and Lulú Margat.

The work of Uruquayan poet Delmira Agustini appeared in almost every issue of Apolo. Her poem "Las coronas" appeared in 1908.

Stricken by tuberculosis, Pérez y Curis died in 1920, at the age of 36.

== Works ==
- Revista Apolo (1905–1909)
- La arquitectura del verso (1913)
- Romances y seguidillas del Plata (1940, Posthumous)
- Heliostropos (1906)
- El poema de la carne
- La canción de las crisaldas
- El gesto contemplativo (1914)

== Works cited ==
- Elizabeth Durand. El Día. Sunday supplement. Year XLVIII N° 2428. Apolo Una Revista de la Primera Decada del 900.
  Montevideo, April 27, 1980.
- Elizabeth Durand. El Día. Sunday supplement. Year XLVIII N° 2430. Manuel Pérez y Curis: Un Realizador con Destino de Silencio,
  Montevideo, May 11, 1980.
- La Enciclopedia de El Pais, Tomo 1. Apolo,
  Montevideo, 2011.
