= Henry Archacki =

Polish graphic artist (born 1907)

Henry (Henryk) Archacki (August 21, 1907 – August 13, 1988) was a notable Polish graphic artist, journalist, researcher, historian, and council member of several different Polish-American groups within the mid-20th century. His illustrated works have been preserved and displayed within many museum and library exhibits. The three largest collections are within the Polish American Museum located in Port Washington, New York, USA at the University at Buffalo, The State University of New York, and also at the University of Minnesota in the Immigration History Research Center. He is survived by his only son, Jan.

== Early life ==
Archacki was born in a very small village located approximately 50 miles North of Warsaw, Poland known as Pieczyska. In 1907, the same year Henry was born, his father, Jozef, left Poland for the American Mid-Western city of Chicago. His mother, Bronisława, followed suit in 1908 with her young child. He was described as, "show[ing] an early proclivity for using a pencil, both artistically and literally."

== In America ==
In his teens, the artist attended Carl Schurz High School in Chicago. After he obtained his degree, he began writing for Chicago's Dziennik Związkowy (Alliance Daily News), focusing on its youth and sports pages. He was also hired as a graphic artist by the Republic Engraving and Design Company. In November 1930 he moved to Brooklyn, New York to run the company's studio there. Shortly thereafter, he met his future wife, Janina (née Wijacka) Wycka.

In just a few years the company was forced out of business due to the depressed economy. In response, Archacki rented a loft near Union Square and created his own graphic design firm, Pioneer Rubber and Engraving Company making ends meet by drawing up advertising, making stamps, drawing murals, and illustrating cartoons.

== "Czy wiecie, że…"; His cartoons ==
In the spirit of making ends meet during the Great Depression of the 1930s, Archacki began illustrating a cartoon strip entitled "Czy wiecie, że…" ("Do you know that…") in 1931. The cartoons, pertaining to the artistic styling known as "factoid comics" depict everything from poetry to boxing in the US and Poland. According to the UB libraries, his cartoons mixed serious and light content, both enlightening and entertaining Archacki's beloved Polonia. Essentially, they were illustrations of Polish oddities patterned after Robert Ripley's "Believe it or Not!" a syndicated newspaper feature. The cartoons were fairly popular as they appealed to the United States' Polonia during the evolution of one of Poland's most stressful times in history; when the nation was independent, then occupied by the German Nazi regime, and then part of the Soviet bloc. Many Polish newspapers around the United States purchased them for print, including the American Polonia Reporter as well as the Polish American Journal. Within the span of his career he was thought to have printed close to 3,000 cartoons accompanied by Polish text. This earned him the nickname of "the Polish Ripley."

Many of Archacki's cartoons have been preserved and digitized by the University at Buffalo Libraries. The Archacki Cartoon Collection includes cartoons that span a 20-year period from 1931 to 1952. The cartoons were originally clipped, saved and scrapbooked by an unknown subscriber of Dziennik dla Wszystkich (Everybody's Daily), a Polish-language newspaper published in Buffalo, New York, during the mid-20th century. The scrapbooks were later acquired by Steven Piwowar, a member of Buffalo's Polish community, and subsequently donated to the University at Buffalo Libraries' Polish Room

Jean Dickson, former curator of the University at Buffalo Libraries Polish Collection, describes the Archacki Cartoon Collection as "a window that reveals Polish Americans in the 1930s and 1940s, both as assimilating citizens of the United States as well as proud inheritors of Polish culture and history. The artist sought to educate and amuse Polish Americans. While many of these cartoons are available in microfilm within specific newspapers, there is no site where they have been collected and made available to the general public online."

The University at Buffalo Libraries received written permission from Jan Archacki, the son and sole heir of Henryk Archacki, to digitize, preserve and present his father's cartoons. Currently, 201 cartoons are available in the Archacki Cartoon Collection. The remaining cartoons will be added to the digital collection as funds become available.

== Progress during the depression ==
Alongside writing and illustrating his popular cartoon strips, Archacki quickly rose to prominence in other Polish-American niches. Additionally in 1931, he became the official sports editor of a literary magazine called The Poland, and later on as the same position for the Nowy Swiat.

== Involvement in the Polish Community ==
In his life, he served as:

- President of the Reymont Literary Guild
- President of the Polish-American Athletic Club
- President of the Polish American Tennis Club
- Secretary General in the General Krzyzanowski Memorial Committee
