= Bibliography of Midwestern history =

The following works deal with the cultural, political, economic, military, biographical and geologic history of the Midwestern United States.

== Overviews ==
- Cayton, Andrew R. L. Midwest and the Nation (1990)
- Cayton, Andrew R. L. and Susan E. Gray, eds. The Identity of the American Midwest: Essays on Regional History. (2001)
- Cayton, Andrew R. L. and Peter S. Onuf, eds. The American Midwest: Rethinking the History of an American Nation (1990)
- Good, David F. "American History through a Midwestern Lens." Wirtschaft und Gesellschaft 38.2 (2012): 435+ online; emphasis on economic history
- Hurt, R. Douglas. The Big Empty: The Great Plains in the Twentieth Century (University of Arizona Press; 2011) 315 pages; the environmental, social, economic, and political history of the region.
- Lauck, Jon K. "Why the Midwest Matters." The Midwest Quarterly 54.2 (2013): 165+
- Nordin, Dennis S., and Roy V. Scott. From Prairie Farmer to Entrepreneur: The Transformation of Midwestern Agriculture. (2005) 356pp.
- Sisson, Richard, Christian Zacher, and Andrew Cayton, eds. The American Midwest: An Interpretive Encyclopedia (Indiana University Press, 2006), 1916 pp of articles by scholars on all topics covering the 12 states
- Walker, Kenneth R. A History of the Middle West From the Beginning to 1970 (1972) 552pp the only textbook
- Wertenbaker, Thomas J. "The Molding of the Middle West." American Historical Review (1948): 223–234. in JSTOR
- Wishart, David J. ed. Encyclopedia of the Great Plains, University of Nebraska Press, 2004, ISBN 0-8032-4787-7. complete text online

=== Historiography ===
- Billington, Ray Allen. "From Association to Organization: The OAH in the Bad Old Days." Journal of American History (1978): 75–84. in JSTOR
- Brown, David S. Beyond the Frontier: The Midwestern Voice in American Historical Writing (2009)
- Buck, Solon J. "The Progress and Possibilities of Mississippi Valley History," Mississippi Valley Historical Review (1923) 10#1 pp. 5–20 in JSTOR
- Clark, Thomas D. "Our Roots Flourished in the Valley." Journal of American History (1978): 85–107. in JSTOR
- Howard, Joseph Kinsey. "New Concepts of Plains History." Montana Magazine of History (1952): 16–23. in JSTOR
- Kirkendall, Richard S., ed. The Organization of American Historians and the Writing and Teaching of American History (Oxford University Press, 2011)
- Lauck, Jon K. "The Prairie Historians and the Foundations of Midwestern History." Annals of Iowa (2012) 71#2 pp: 137–173.
- Lauck, Jon K. The Lost Region: Toward a Revival of Midwestern History (University of Iowa Press; 2013) 166 pages; criticizes the neglect of the Midwest in contemporary historiography and argues for a revival of attention excerpt
- Madison, James H., ed. Heartland: Comparative Histories of the Midwestern States (Indiana UP, 1988)
- Ross, Earle D. "A Generation of Prairie Historiography." Mississippi Valley Historical Review 33#3 (1946) pp: 391–410. in JSTOR
- Tyrrell, Ian. "Public at the Creation: Place, Memory, and Historical Practice in the Mississippi Valley Historical Association, 1907-1950," Journal of American History (2007) 94#1 pp. 19–46 in JSTOR

== Before 1783 ==
- Fisher, James. "A Forgotten Hero Remembered, Revered, and Revised: The Legacy and Ordeal of George Rogers Clark." Indiana Magazine of History (1996): 109–132. online
- Pauketat, Timothy R. Cahokia: Ancient America’s Great City on the Mississippi (2009)
- White, Richard. The Middle Ground: Indians, Empires, and Republics in the Great Lakes region, 1650-1815 (1991)

== Frontier Era: 1783-1850 ==
- Barnhart, John D. Valley of Democracy: The Frontier versus the Plantation in the Ohio Valley, 1775-1818 (1953)
- Billington, Ray Allen, and Martin Ridge. Westward Expansion: A History of the American Frontier (5th ed. 2001); 892 pp; textbook with 160pp of detailed annotated bibliographies
- Buley, R. Carlyle. The Old Northwest: Pioneer Period 1815–1840 2 vol (1951), Pulitzer Prize
- Etcheson, Nicole. Bleeding Kansas: Contested Liberty in the Civil War Era (2006)
- Lamar, Howard, ed. The New Encyclopedia of the American West (1998); this is a revised version of Reader's Encyclopedia of the American West ed. by Howard Lamar (1977)
- Larson, John Lauritz. "Teaching the West in the Early American Republic: Old Chestnuts and the Fruits of New Research." Magazine of History (2000): 17–20. in JSTOR, historiography
- Rodriguez, Junius P. ed. The Louisiana Purchase: A Historical and Geographical Encyclopedia (2002)
- Scheiber, Harry N. ed. The Old Northwest; studies in regional history, 1787-1910 (1969) 16 essays by scholars on economic and social topics
- Smelser, Marshall. "Tecumseh, Harrison, and the War of 1812," Indiana Magazine of History (March 1969) 65#1 pp 25–44 online
- Watts, Edward, and David Rachels, eds. The First West: Writing from the American Frontier, 1776-1860 (Oxford University Press, 2002), 960pp; primary sources excerpt and text search
- Wyman, Mark. The Wisconsin Frontier (2009)

== Civil War & Gilded Age ==
- Barker, Brett, et al. eds. Union Heartland: The Midwestern Home Front During the Civil War (2013).
- Gjerde, Jon. Minds of the West: Ethnocultural Evolution in the Rural Middle West, 1830–1917 (1999) excerpt and text search
- Jensen, Richard J. The Winning of the Midwest: Social and Political Conflict, 1888–96 (University of Chicago Press, 1971) online
- Jordan, Philip D.Ohio Comes of Age: 1873-1900 Volume 5 (1968) online
- Kleppner, Paul. The cross of culture : a social analysis of midwestern politics, 1850-1900 (1970) online
- Nye, Russel B. Midwestern Progressive Politics (1959)
- Scheiber, Harry N. ed. The Old Northwest; studies in regional history, 1787-1910 (1969) 16 essays by scholars on economic and social topics
- Thornbrough, Emma Lou. Indiana in the Civil War Era, 1850-1880 (1965); the standard scholarly history

== 1900 to 1940 ==
- Billington, Ray Allen. "The Origins of Middle Western Isolationism," Political Science Quarterly (1945) 60#1, 45–64. in JSTOR
- Bonnifield, Paul. The Dust Bowl: Men, Dirt, and Depression, (University of New Mexico Press, 1978)
- Egge, Sara. Woman Suffrage and Citizenship in the Midwest, 1870-1920 (2018).
- Shannon, Fred A. "The Status of the Midwestern Farmer in 1900" The Mississippi Valley Historical Review. (1950), 37#3 pp: 491–510. in JSTOR

== 1940 to present ==
- Hurt, R. Douglas. The Great Plains during World War II. (U of Nebraska Press, 2008). Pp. 507pp.
- Wuthnow, Robert. Remaking the Heartland: Middle America since the 1950s (2011) comprehensive survey excerpt

== Culture ==
- Hutton, Graham. Midwest at Noon (1946), analysis of regional culture
- Rees, Amanda. The Great Plains Region: The Greenwood Encyclopedia of American Regional Cultures (2004); architecture, art, fashion, folklore, food, language, literature, music, religion, and sports
- Shortridge, James R. The Middle West: Its Meaning in American Culture (1989) excerpt and text search
- Slade, Joseph W. and Judith Lee. The Midwest: The Greenwood Encyclopedia of American Regional Cultures (2004); architecture, art, fashion, folklore, food, language, literature, music, religion, and sports

== Economics ==
=== Agriculture ===
- Atack, Jeremy and Fred Bateman. To Their Own Soil: Agriculture in the Antebellum North (Iowa State University Press, 1987)* Grant, Michael Johnston. Down and Out on the Family Farm: Rural Rehabilitation in the Great Plains, 1929-1945, (University of Nebraska Press, (2002)
- Hart, John Fraser. "Change in the corn belt." Geographical Review (1986) pp: 51–72. online
- Jones, Robert Leslie. History of Agriculture in Ohio to 1880 (1983)
- Jones, Robert Leslie. "The Horse and Mule Industry in Ohio to 1865." Mississippi Valley Historical Review (1946): 61–88. in JSTOR
- Page, Brian and Richard Walker. "From Settlement to Fordism: The Agro-Industrial Revolution in the American Midwest," Economic Geography (1991) 67#4, 281–315.
- Shannon, Fred A. "The Status of the Midwestern Farmer in 1900" Mississippi Valley Historical Review (1950) 27#3 pp: 491–510. in JSTOR

=== Industry ===
- High, Stephen C. Industrial Sunset: The Making of North America’s Rust Belt, 1969-1984 (2003)
- Longworth, Richard C. Caught in the Middle: America’s Heartland in the Age of Globalism (2008)
- Meyer, David R. "Midwestern Industrialization and the American Manufacturing Belt in the Nineteenth Century", The Journal of Economic History, Vol. 49, No. 4 (December, 1989) pp. 921–937.in JSTOR
- Page, Brian and Richard Walker. "From Settlement to Fordism: The Agro-Industrial Revolution in the American Midwest," Economic Geography (1991) 67#4, 281–315.

=== Labor ===
- Boryczka, Raymond, and Lorin Lee Cary. No Strength Without Union: An Illustrated History of Ohio Workers, 1803-1980 Ohio Historical Society, 1982.
- Critchlow, Donald (ed.). Socialism in the Heartland: The Midwestern Experience, 1900-1925. Notre Dame, IN: University of Notre Dame Press, 1986.
- Feurer, Rosemary. Radical Unionism in the Midwest, 1900-1950. Urbana, IL: University of Illinois Press, 2006.
- Higbie, Frank Tobias. Indispensable Outcasts: Hobo Workers and Community in the American Midwest, 1880-1930. (2003).
- Margo, Robert A. "Regional Wage Gaps and the Settlement of the Midwest." Explorations in Economic History (1999) 36#2 pp: 128–143.
- Nelson, Daniel. Farm and Factory: Workers in the Midwest 1880-1990. (1995) online review
- Neth, Mary. "Gender and the Family Labor System: Defining Work in the Rural Midwest." Journal of Social History (1994): 563–577. in JSTOR
- Schob, David E. Hired Hands and Plowboys: Farm labor in the Midwest, 1815-60. (1975).
- Warren, Wilson J. Struggling with Iowa's Pride: Labor Relations, Unionism, and Politics in the Rural Midwest Since 1877. (2000)

=== Railroads and transportation ===
- Atack, Jeremy, et al. "Did railroads induce or follow economic growth? Urbanization and Population Growth in the American Midwest, 1850–1860." Social Science History 34.2 (2010): 171–197. online
- Campbell, Ballard. "The Good Roads Movement in Wisconsin, 1890-1911," Wisconsin Magazine of History 49 (1966): 273–93
- Grant, H. Roger (2010). Twilight Rails: The Final Era of Railroad Building in the Midwest. Minneapolis: University of Minnesota Press. ISBN 0-8166-7366-7. OCLC 676696378.
- Kane, Adam I. The Western River Steamboat (2004)
- Larson, John Lauritz. Bonds of enterprise: John Murray Forbes and western development in America's railway age (2010).
- Mercer, Lloyd J. "Land Grants to American Railroads: Social Cost or Social Benefit?" Business History Review (1969) 43#2 pp 134–151 in JSTOR
- Meyer, Balthasar Henry, and Caroline Elizabeth MacGill. History of Transportation in the United States before 1860 (1917). online
- White, Richard. Railroaded: The Transcontinentals and the Making of Modern America (2011)

== Geography, land and environment ==
- Blouet, Brian W. and Frederick C. Luebke, eds. The Great Plains: Environment and Culture (U of Nebraska Press, 1979)
- Cronon, William. Nature's Metropolis: Chicago and the Great West (1992), 1850–1900 excerpt and text search
- Garland, John H. The North American Midwest: A Regional Geography (1955)
- Hart, John Fraser. "The Middle West." Annals of the Association of American Geographers (1972) 62#2 pp: 258–282. in JSTOR
- Rohrbough, Malcolm J. The Land Office Business: The Settlement and Administration of American Public Lands, 1789-1837 (1968)
- Van Atta, John R. Securing the West: Politics, Public Lands, and the Fate of the Old Republic, 1785--1850 (2014)

== Politics ==
- Buck, Solon J. The Granger Movement: A Study of Agricultural Organization and Its Political, Economic and Social Manifestations, 1870-1880 (1913) online
- Fenton, James H. Midwest politics (1966), voting patterns by state
- Jensen, Richard J. The Winning of the Midwest: Social and Political Conflict, 1888–96 (University of Chicago Press, 1971) online
- Lauck, Jon K. "Trump and The Midwest: The 2016 Presidential Election and The Avenues of Midwestern Historiography" Studies in Midwestern History (2017) vol 3#1 online
- Lauck, Jon K. and Catherine McNicol Stock, eds. The Conservative Heartland: A Political History of the Postwar American Midwest (UP of Kansas, 2020) online review
- Pearce, Neal R. The Great Plains States of America: People, Politics, and Power in the Nine Great Plains States (1973); in-depth coverage of politics and economy
- Pearce, Neal R. The Great Lakes States of America: People, politics, and power in the Five Great Lakes States (1980); in-depth coverage of politics and economy

== Social history ==
=== Education ===
- Fuller, Wayne. The Old Country School: The Story of Rural Education in the Middle West (U of Chicago Press, 1982).
- Mattingly, Paul H. and Edward W. Stevens Jr. Schools and the Means of Education Shall Forever Be Encouraged: A History of Education in the Old Northwest, 1787-1880 (1987), 132pp
- Theobald, Paul. Call School: Rural Education in the Midwest to 1918 (Southern Illinois University Press, 1995)
- Wheeler, Kenneth H. Cultivating Regionalism: Higher Education and the Making of the American Midwest (2011)

=== Race ===
- Lehman, Christopher P. Slavery in the Upper Mississippi Valley, 1787-1865 (2011)
- Thornbrough, Emma Lou. Negro in Indiana before 1900 : a study of a minority 1993
- Thornbrough, Emma Lou. Indiana Blacks in the twentieth century (2001) online

=== Religion ===
- Barlow, Philip, and Mark Silk, eds. Religion and public life in the Midwest: America's common denominator? (2004)
- Bodensieck, Julius, ed. The encyclopedia of the Lutheran Church (3 vol 1965) vol 1 and 3 online free
- Brauer, James Leonard and Fred L. Precht, eds. Lutheran Worship: History and Practice (1993)
- Gjerde, Jon. The Minds of the West: Ethnocultural evolution in the rural Middle West, 1830-1917 (1999)
- Granquist, Mark. Lutherans in America: A New History (2015)
- Madison, James H. "Reformers and the Rural Church, 1900-1950," Journal of American History 73 (1986): 645–68.
- Meyer, Carl S. Moving Frontiers: Readings in the History of the Lutheran Church Missouri Synod (1986)
- Sweet, W.W. ed. Religion on the American Frontier (4 vol 1931-46), primary sources; lengthy volumes on Methodists, Baptists, Congregationalists, Presbyterians

=== Rural ===
- Barron, Hal S. Mixed Harvest: the Second Great Transformation in the Rural North, 1870-1930 (1997).
- Douglas, Lake. "'To Improve the Soil and the Mind': Content and Context of Nineteenth-Century Agricultural Literature." Landscape Journal 25.1 (2006): 67–79.
- Egge, Sara. Woman Suffrage and Citizenship in the Midwest, 1870-1920 (2018).
- Fry, John. “Good Farming – Clear Thinking – Right Living”: Midwestern Farm Newspapers, Social Reform, and Rural Readers in the Early Twentieth Century.” Agricultural History 78#1 (2004): 34-49.
- Motz, Marilyn Ferris. "Folk Expression of Time and Place: 19th-Century Midwestern Rural Diaries." Journal of American Folklore 100#396 (1987): 131–147. online
- Neth, Mary. Preserving the Family Farm: Women, Community, and the Foundations of Agribusiness in the Midwest, 1900-1945 (1995).
- Reynolds, David R. There goes the neighborhood: Rural school consolidation at the grass roots in early twentieth-century Iowa (U of Iowa Press, 2002).
- Riney-Kehrberg, Pamela. Childhood on the Farm: Work, Play, and Coming of Age in the Midwest (2005).
- Riney-Kehrberg, Pamela. “Farm Youth and Progressive Agricultural Reform: Dexter D. Mayne and the Farm Boy Cavaliers of America.” Agricultural History 85#4 (2011) 437–459.
- Weber, Margaret. "Making the best better: 4-H and rural anxiety in the early twentieth century." (MA thesis Iowa State University, 2013) online.

=== Settlement and ethnicity ===
- Aponte, Robert, and Marcelo Siles Cabrera. "Latinos in the heartland: The browning of the Midwest" (Julian Samora Research Institute, Michigan State University, 1994) online
- Gjerde, Jon. The Minds of the West: Ethnocultural evolution in the rural Middle West, 1830-1917 (1999)
- Hudson, John C. "North American Origins of Middlewestern Frontier Populations," Annals of the Association of American Geographers (1988) 78#3 pp: 395–413. in JSTOR
- Mathews, Lois Kimbell. The Expansion of New England: The Spread of New England Settlement and Institutions to the Mississippi River, 1620- 1865 (1909) online
- Power, Richard Lyle. Planting Corn Belt Culture: The Impress of the Upland Southerner and Yankee in the Old Northwest (1953).

=== Urban ===
- Bodenhamer, David, ed. The Encyclopedia of Indianapolis (1994)
- Muller, Edward K. "Selective urban growth in the Middle Ohio Valley, 1800-1860." Geographical Review (1976): 178–199. online; also in JSTOR
- Reiff, Janice L., Ann Durkin Keating, and James R. Grossman, eds. The Encyclopedia of Chicago (2005) complete online version
- Teaford, Jon C. Cities of the Heartland: The Rise and Fall of the Industrial Midwest (1993)
- Van Tassell, David, and John J Grabowski, eds. The Encyclopedia of Cleveland History (2nd ed. 1996)

=== Women ===
- Aley, Ginette. "'Knotted Together Like Roots in the Darkness': Rural Midwestern Women and Region-A Bibliographic Guide." Agricultural history (2003) 77#3 pp: 453–481. in JSTOR
- Aley, Ginette. "A Republic of Farm People: Women, Families, and Market-Minded Agrarianism in Ohio, 1820s–1830s." Ohio History (2007) 114#1 pp: 28–45. online
- Egge, Sara. Woman Suffrage and Citizenship in the Midwest, 1870-1920 (2018).
- Gabin, Nancy. "Fallow Yet Fertile: The Field of Indiana Women's History." Indiana Magazine of History (2000) online
- Jensen, Joan M. Calling This Place Home: Women on the Wisconsin Frontier, 1850-1925 (Minnesota Historical Press: 2006).
- Johnson, Yvonne, ed. Feminist Frontiers: Women who Shaped the Midwest (Truman State Univ Press, 2010) excerpt and text search
- Murphy, Lucy Eldersveld, and Wendy Hamand Venet, eds. Midwestern Women: Work, Community, and Leadership at the Crossroads (1997),
- Neth, Mary. Preserving the Family Farm: Women, Community, and the Foundations of Agribusiness in the Midwest, 1900-1945 (1995).
- Riley, Glenda. The Female Frontier: A Comparative View of Women on the Prairie and the Plains (1988)
- Schlissel, Lillian. Women's Diaries of the Westward Journey (2004) excerpt
- Stuhler, Barbara, and Gretchen V. Kreuter, eds. Women of Minnesota: Selected Biographical Essays (Minnesota Historical Society Press, 1998), 16 essays by experts covering numerous women

== Primary sources ==
- Frederick, John T., ed. Out of the Midwest: A Collection of Present-Day Writing (1944) 428pp
- Watts, Edward, and David Rachels, eds. The First West: Writing from the American Frontier, 1776-1860 (Oxford University Press, 2002), 960pp; primary sources excerpt and text search, long excerpts from 59 authors, chiefly Midwesterners

== See also ==
- American frontier
- Great Plains
- Midwestern United States
  - History of the Midwestern United States
  - Midwestern United States topics
- History of Illinois
- Illinois in the American Civil War
  - History of Chicago
- History of Indiana
- Indiana in the American Civil War
- History of Iowa
- History of Kansas
- History of Michigan
- Michigan in the American Civil War
  - History of Detroit
- History of Minnesota
- Minnesota in the American Civil War
  - History of Minneapolis
  - History of St. Paul
- History of Missouri
- Missouri in the American Civil War
  - History of Kansas City
  - History of St. Louis
- History of Nebraska
- Nebraska in the American Civil War
- History of North Dakota
- History of Ohio
- Ohio in the American Civil War
  - History of Cleveland
  - History of Cincinnati
- History of South Dakota
- History of Wisconsin
- Wisconsin in the American Civil War
- List of bibliographies on American history
