= Italians in Chicago, 1880-1930 =

1970 book by Humbert S. Nelli

Italians in Chicago, 1880-1930: Study in Ethnic Mobility
- Title page for Italians in Chicago, 1880-1930 (1970)
- Author: Humber S. Nelli
- Language: English
- Series: Urban Life in America
- Genre: Non-fiction
- Publisher: Oxford University Press
- Publication date: 1970
- Publication place: United States

Italians in Chicago, 1880-1930: Study in Ethnic Mobility is a non-fiction book by Humbert S. Nelli, published by Oxford University Press in 1970. A part of the "Urban Life in America" collection, it is about the Italian American community of Chicago.

Thomas Philpott of the University of Texas at Austin wrote that the book talked about how Italian Americans formed community even though they were dispersed in areas where their concentrations did not often exceed 50% of a community and they had moved from place to place.

Edgar Litt of the University of Connecticut stated that the fact that this information is presented by historians instead of by political scientists was "The most significant aspect" of the work.

Constance Cronin of the University of Arizona stated that the book shows the culture of group and that it has "an intricate welter of superficial details", but not any theories explaining a how and why.

== Background ==
Nelli made a PhD thesis on newspapers from the Italian American community. He received his PhD from the University of Chicago in 1965.

Nelli used lists of registered voters, newspaper articles from ethnic publications, social surveys, telephone directories, and documents from churches and fraternal organizations. Some documents were used since he was unable to access equivalent U.S. Census information. Cronin characterized the research process done as "extensive". The book uses translations of portions of newspaper articles made for the Chicago Foreign Language Press Survey. Rudolph J. Vecoli of the University of Minnesota described the research collection as "impressive". Litt stated that the book's sourcing was "copiously documented".

== Contents ==
The first chapter, "Rural Italy to Urban America," has information on the originating communities and the destination countries of the immigrants, as well as the initial reception to the immigrants from Americans.

Chapter two is "Patterns of Settlement", which states that immigrant neighborhoods were temporary places until the immigrants gained enough money to move to more expensive neighborhoods. Cronin argues it is not a new finding, and that that the chapter is "by far the most interesting, useful, and, at the same time, irritating of all." Cronin argues that especially local detail for people from Chicagoland is "An especially annoying feature" as a person not from Chicagoland may not understand the detail. Chapters one and two focus on periods until 1920.

Chapter three is "Economic Activity". The chapter argues that employers of Italian immigrants had not largely taken advantage of them. The chapter has no statistics on union activity.

Chapter four is "Ethnic Group Politics". It describes politicians of Italian ancestry and their collaboration with those of Irish ancestry.

Chapter five is "Italians and Crime". Cronin stated that some of the statements in the chapter were unsupported by statistics and "dubious and dangerous".

Chapter six is "Community Institutions and Assimilation" and describes religious and media organizations and benevolent societies.

Chapter seven is "Decade of Transition" talks about changes from the World War I era to the Great Depression. Cronin stated that there were "questionable conclusions and amazing detail about individuals and places."

There are thirteen tables, nine maps, an index, and several back notes. There is no bibliography section.

== Reception ==
Cronin wrote that the book's problem is that it focuses too much on "fine points of crime and politicians" and not on "the process of change." Cronin concluded that the book "could have been good" and that this is its "major fault".

M. N. Cutsumbis of Marietta College stated that the book is "excellent", stating that it was made "thoroughly" and "comprehensively", and that writing style is "lucid".

Litt stated that the book was "tightly-woven" and "blessed with more vitality and cultural flavor than the usual historical monograph." Litt criticized "a weak intellectual bridge between disciplines and scholarly interests."

Philpott argued that the book is an "indispensable contribution" to the field.

Vecoli criticized how, in his impression, the conclusion statements do not agree with the research that Nelli had collected. Vecoli stated that the book would not be good for readers wishing to learn how Italian Americans evolved, while it would be "informative and entertaining" for people unfamiliar with the Italian American history of Chicago. Vecoli stated that "one learns very little from this book about either ethnicity or mobility" despite the book's subtitle.

== See also ==
- Italians in Chicago
