= Diccionario del español del Uruguay =

Dictionary of Uruguayan Spanish
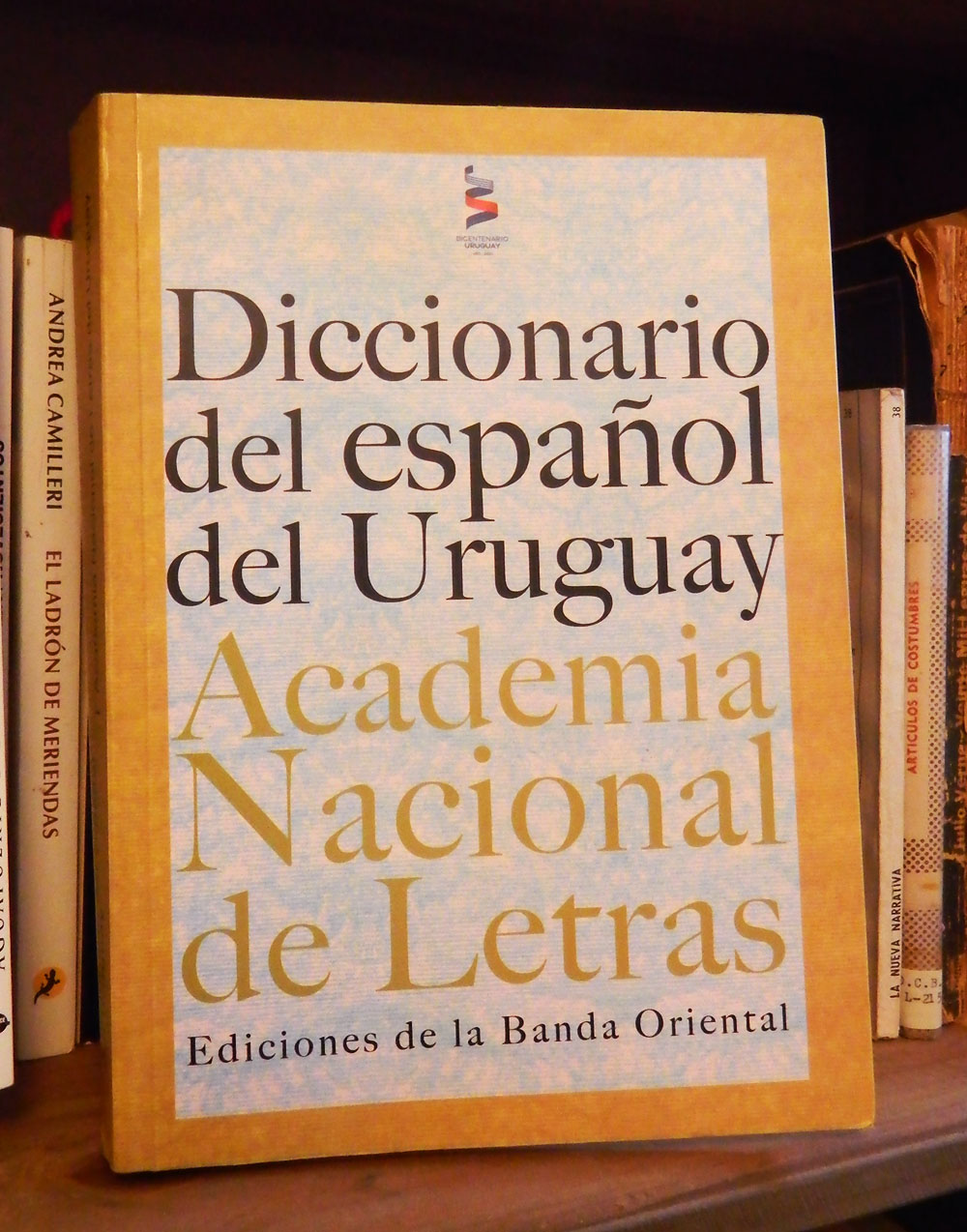
- Original title: Diccionario del español del Uruguay
- Language: Spanish
- Genre: Reference
- Published: 2011
- Publisher: Academia Nacional de Letras del Uruguay, Ediciones de la Banda Oriental
- Publication place: Uruguay
- ISBN: 978-9974-1-0709-0
- OCLC: 770376070

The Dictionary of Uruguayan Spanish (Spanish: Diccionario del español del Uruguay, acronym DEU) is an authoritative reference work on the Rioplatense Spanish as spoken in Uruguay. It was published by the National Academy of Uruguay in 2011 as part of the celebrations of the Bicentennial of Uruguay.

With over 10,000 entries, it deals with typically Uruguayan expressions, not used in standard Spanish. The collected material covers sports, clothing, economy, fauna and flora, sexuality, greeting and courtesy formulas, cuisine, colors, education, ethnicity, agriculture, bureaucracy, the human body, foreign affairs and much more. It comes from both ordinary and colloquial or family speech, as well as journalism, literature, chatting, blogging, advertising, as well as feminine, masculine, child or youth language, alongside medical, military, political, or trade union slang.
