= Uruguayan Spanish =

Variety of Spanish language

- castellano uruguayo
- Pronunciation: [espaˈɲol uɾuˈɣwaʝo]
- Native to: Uruguay
- Region: Río de la Plata
- Native speakers: 3,347,800, all users in Uruguay (2014); L1 users: 3,270,000; L2 users: 77,800
- Language family: Indo-European: Italic; Latino-Faliscan; Romance; Italo-Western; Western; Ibero-Romance; West Iberian; Castilian; Spanish; Rioplatense Spanish; Uruguayan Spanish
- Early forms: Proto-Indo-European: Proto-Italic; Old Latin; Vulgar Latin; Proto-Romance; Old Spanish; Early Modern Spanish
- Writing system: Latin (Spanish alphabet)

Official status
- Regulated by: Academia Nacional de Letras

Language codes
- ISO 639-1: es
- ISO 639-2: spa
- ISO 639-3: –
- Glottolog: None
- IETF: es-UY
- Green: Border Uruguayan Portuguese; Teal: Border Spanish; Purple: Littoral Spanish; Blue: Fernandino Spanish; Yellow: Montevideo Spanish

Uruguayan Spanish (Spanish: castellano uruguayo), a part of Rioplatense Spanish, is the variety of Spanish spoken in Uruguay and by the Uruguayan diaspora.

== Influences ==
There is strong influence of Italian and its dialects, particularly Genovese, because of the presence of large Italian communities in the country (for example in Montevideo and Paysandú). The Uruguayan accent differs from the accents of Spain and other Spanish American countries, except for Argentina, due to Italian influence. There are many Italian words incorporated in the language (nona, cucha, fainá ("farinata, chickpea flour crêpe"), chapar, parlar, festichola ("house party"), etc.), as well as words of Italian derivation (for example: mina derived from femmina, or pibe ("child") from pivello). Italian has also altered the meaning of many preexisting Spanish words. For instance, pronto means "soon" in most Spanish dialects, including Argentine Spanish. However in Uruguayan Spanish, pronto instead means "ready", the same meaning as pronto in Italian.

Uruguayan Spanish was also influenced by several native languages. For instance the Uruguayan word pororó meaning "popcorn" originating from the Tupian language Guaraní. Another examples is the word gurí/gurises meaning "kid(s)" which originates from the Guaraní word ngiri, also meaning child.

In the southeastern department of Rocha, as well as along the northern border with Brazil, there is some influence of Brazilian Portuguese, in addition to the Portuguese spoken in northern Uruguay.

== Grammar ==
=== Tuteo vs voseo ===
In the southern region of the country including Montevideo, the voseo form of address is used. The second-person pronoun vos is used instead of tú, along with its associated verbal conjugations. In other areas of the country, tuteo is more commonly used than voseo, such as Rocha and in some parts of Maldonado. In some places, tú is used as the subjective pronoun with the verb conjugated in accordance to voseo; tú tenés instead of tú tienes (tuteo) or vos tenés (voseo). Use of the tuteo or voseo form of the prepositional pronoun—ti and vos respectively—also varies. Spanish exhibits a fused tuteo prepositional pronoun ti with the preposition con into a single compound word contigo. In contrast to Argentina where contigo is rarely used, Uruguay exhibits more variance between contigo and con vos, with con vos still the more frequent of the two. Though there is much variation, Uruguayan Spanish generally prefers ti as the second-person prepositional pronoun over vos with the exception of con vos.

As with most dialects of Spanish, the formal pronoun usted is used in very formal contexts, such as when speaking to government authorities.

=== Había vs habían ===
In Spanish, hay means "there are/is." Though unintuitive, it is technically the third-person impersonal indicative conjugation of haber meaning "to have". Its usage indicating existence originates from Old Spanish's ha ý (“it has there”), ha being the third-person singular present form of aver (“to have”) + ý, a locative pronoun. Since hay is both the plural and singular impersonal present indicative conjugation, the subject's number is irrelevant. However in the imperfect, the impersonal indicative haber splits between the plural and the singular: había ("there was") and habían ("there are"). In prescriptive grammar, había is considered the proper conjugation in both cases. However in Uruguayan Spanish, habían is occasionally used as the plural impersonal imperfect indicative conjugation while in other dialects of Spanish (including Argentinian Spanish) it is essentially never used at all. For example, había flores (literally "there was flowers") is considered proper while habían flores ("there were flowers") is considered improper.

== Vocabulary ==
Much of Uruguayan vocabulary overlaps with Argentina under the banner of Rioplatense. However, there are a few deviations in meaning of words and commonly used parlance that distinguishes Uruguayan Spanish from Argentine Spanish. For instance,

- Pronto, despite meaning "soon" in Argentine Spanish, means "ready" in Uruguayan Spanish.
- In Uruguay, kids are referred to as gurises while in Argentina they are referred to as pibes. While gurises is not used in most of Argentina, apart from Entre Ríos Province, which borders most of Uruguay, pibes is still used in Uruguay, however less commonly. Both words are also used to refer to friends affectionately, while pibe has expanded to mean young man. Botija is also used to refer to children.
- Ta in Uruguayan Spanish means "OK", with a similar ability to communicate a variety of emotions as "OK" has in English. For instance, repetition of the word communicates exasperated comprehension ("Ta, ta" communicating the same emotion as "Ok, ok!"). Emphasis of the word communicates anger ("¡TA!" tantamount to "OK!"; "Enough!"). Sometimes expressed as da.
- Because of the final /s/ before consonants is often aspirated in Rioplatense Spanish, vos (you) is often shortened in Uruguay to just bo/vo. This is reserved for more casual speech.
- Brisco, a derogatory term for gay people, isn't commonly used in Argentina however is in Uruguay, along with much of the rest of South America.
- The phrase a las órdenes is also commonly used in Uruguay. Although literally meaning "at your orders", its meaning is closer to the English phrase "let me know if you need anything" and communicates that the speaker is there for the subject.
- In Uruguay, the phrase gusto tuyo is used to communicate romantic interest in someone, literally translating to "I like yours". This is in comparison to the more direct me gustas used in much of the rest of the Spanish speaking world or gusto de vos, literally translating to "pleasure of you".
- ¡Vamo’ Arriba! is a commonly used expression in Uruguay, the equivalent to the phrase "Let's Go!" in English.
- ¡Que rica! is another Uruguayan expression. It's an expression of success or, often sexual, pleasure.
- Pila, literally meaning "pile", is a term used to express a large, excessive, or overwhelming quantity, similar to "a ton" in English. For example, caminé pila ("I walked a ton").
- Ñeri (also spelled Ñery) shortening for "compañero", theorized to come from "compañero de celda" ("cellmate") is an Uruguayan term used in two different ways, as an extremely informal, sometimes affectionate (and improper in most settings) way to refer to someone as "friend", "partner" or "mate", an example would be:"how are you friend/mate/partner?" ("como estas ñery?"). And in reference to a vulgar and/or uneducated person, in the same manner as "turro" is used in Argentina (and Uruguay).
- Merecidas and also Merece, meaning "deserved" and "deserve", is used in Uruguay as a response to gracias ("thank you"). It expresses that whatever was given that elicited the thanking was deserved by the thanker. A variation of the expression is used by the elder generations in Argentina.
- Garra Charrua is an expression that translates to "Claw of the Charrúa", an ethnic group indigenous to Uruguay who fought the Spanish conquistadors in present-day Uruguay. It is a nationalistic term used to refer to the tenacity and courage of the Uruguayan people. It is commonly used in regards to football.
- Salado, while meaning "expensive" in Argentina, has a meaning closer to "incredible" or "grand".
- Todo bien, directly translates to "all good" in English and is used in the same manner.
- Trancar meaning "to lock" is a loanword from Portuguese that's commonly used in Uruguay.

=== Comparative Vocabulary ===
Below are vocabulary differences between Uruguay and other Spanish-speaking countries: Argentina, Paraguay, Spain, Mexico, Costa Rica, Chile, and Puerto Rico. It shows how Spanish is different in three continents where there are Spanish-speaking countries (Europe, North America, and South America) and in different regions of those continents (Central America, Caribbean, and Southern Cone). Italian and Brazilian Portuguese have also been influential in Uruguayan Spanish and are also included. While people in Uruguay and most of Argentina speak the dialect Rioplatense, there are some notable differences in vocabulary between the two countries, which are bolded.

American English	Uruguay	Argentina	Chile	Paraguay	Colombia	Mexico	Costa Rica	Puerto Rico	Spain	Brazil	Italy	Ref.
apartment	**apartamento**	**departamento**	departamento	departamento	apartamento	departamento	apartamento	apartamento	piso	apartamento	appartamento	
apricot	damasco	damasco	damasco	damasco	albaricoque	chabacano	albaricoque	albaricoque	albaricoque	damasco	albicocca	
artichoke	alcaucil	alcaucil	alcachofa	alcachofa	alcachofa	alcachofa	alcachofa	alcachofa	alcachofa	alcachofra	carciofo	
avocado	palta	palta	palta	aguacate	aguacate	aguacate	aguacate	aguacate	aguacate	abacate	avocado	
banana	banana	banana	plátano	banana	banano	plátano	banano	guineo	plátano	banana	banana	
bean	poroto	poroto	poroto	poroto	frijol	frijol	frijol	habichuela	judía/alubia	feijão	fagiolo	
bell pepper	morrón	morrón	pimiento	locote	pimentón	pimiento	chile dulce	pimiento	pimiento	pimentão	peperone	
boiler	**caldera**	**pava**	calefón	calefón	calefón	bóiler	calefón	caldera	caldera	caldeira	caldaia	
bra	**soutien**	**corpiño**	sostén	corpiño	brasier	brasier	brasier	brasier	sujetador	sutiã	reggiseno	
butter	manteca	manteca	mantequilla	manteca	mantequilla	mantequilla	mantequilla	mantequilla	mantequilla	manteiga	burro	
car	auto	auto	auto	auto	carro	carro	carro	carro	coche	carro	macchina	
clothespin	**palillo**	**broche**	pinza	pinza	gancho	pinza	prensa	pinche	pinza	prendedor	molletta	
corn on the cob	choclo	choclo	choclo	choclo	mazorca	elote	elote	mazorca	mazorca	espiga de milho	pannocchia	
earring	**caravana**	**aro**	aro	aro	arete	arete	arete	pantalla	pendiente	brinco	orecchino	
gas station	**bomba**	**estación de servicio**	bencinera	surtidor	bomba	gasolinería	bomba	gasolinera	gasolinera	posto de gasolina	stazione di servizio	
grapefruit	pomelo	pomelo	pomelo	pomelo	toronja	toronja	toronja	toronja	pomelo	toranja	pompelmo	
green bean	chaucha	chaucha	poroto verde	chaucha	habichuela	ejote	vainica	habichuela tierna	judía verde	vagem	fagiolino	
panties	bombacha	bombacha	calzón	bombacha	calzón	calzón	calzón	panty	braga	calcinha	mutande	
papaya	papaya	papaya	papaya	mamón	papaya	papaya	papaya	papaya/ lechosa	papaya	mamão	papaia	
pastries	**biscochos**	**facturas**	pasteles	pasteles	pasteles	pan dulce	tortas	pasteles	repostería	pastelaria	pasticcini	
pea	arveja	arveja	arveja	arveja	arveja	chícharo	guisante	guisante	guisante	ervilha	pisello	
peach	durazno	durazno	durazno	durazno	durazno	durazno	melocotón	melocotón	melocotón	pêssego	pesca	
peanut	maní	maní	maní	maní	maní	cacahuate	maní	maní	cacahuete	amendoim	arachide	
pineapple	ananá	ananá	piña	piña	piña	piña	piña	piña	piña	abacaxi	ananas	
popcorn	**pop** / **pororó**	**pochoclo**	cabritas	pororó	crispetas/ maíz pira	palomitas	palomitas de maíz	popcorn	palomitas	pipocas	popcorn	
sandwich (Note: Refers to the type of sandwich made with sandwich bread, not a sandwich made with a roll or baguette known as a sub sandwich which has a distinct word in Italian and many Spanish dialects.)	**refuerzo**	**sánguche**	sánguche	sánguche	sánduche	torta	sandwich	sánduche	sándwich	sanduíche	tramezzino	
sneakers	**championes**	**zapatillas**	zapatillas	championes	tenis	tenis	zapato tenis	tenis	zapatillas/ playeras	tênis	scarpe da ginnastica	
soft drink	**refresco**	**gaseosa**	bebida	gaseosa	gaseosa	refresco	gaseosa	refresco	refresco	refrigerante	bibita	
straw	pajita	sorbete	bombilla	pajita	pitillo	popote	pajilla	sorbeto	pajita	canudo	cannuccia	
strawberry	frutilla	frutilla	frutilla	frutilla	fresa	fresa	fresa	fresa	fresa	morango	fragola	
sweet potato	**boniato**	**batata**	camote	batata	batata	camote	camote	batata	boniato	batata doce	patata dolce	
swimming pool	**piscina**	**pileta**	piscina	pileta	piscina	alberca	piscina	piscina	piscina	piscina	piscina	
transit bus (Note: Although the official word for bus deviates between Argentina and Uruguay, in both countries the word bondi is used more frequently in colloquial speech.)	**ómnibus**	**colectivo**	micro	colectivo	autobús	camión	autobús	guagua	autobús	ônibus	autobus	
t-shirt	remera	remera	polera	remera	camiseta	playera	camiseta	t-shirt	camiseta	camiseta	maglietta	

== See also ==
- Languages of Uruguay
- Rioplatense Spanish
- Lunfardo
- Diccionario del español del Uruguay
