= IHRC =

IHRC may refer to:

- Immigration History Research Center at the University of Minnesota in the United States
- Indiana Hi-Rail Corporation, defunct railroad company of the United States
- International Hurricane Research Center at Florida International University in the United States
- Irish Human Rights Commission, government agency in Ireland
- Islamic Human Rights Commission, advocacy organization in London, United Kingdom
