= Rudolph J. Vecoli =

American historian (1927–2008)

- Born: March 27, 1927; Wallingford, Connecticut, U.S.
- Died: June 17, 2008 (aged 81); St. Louis Park, Minnesota, U.S.
- Occupation: Historian

Academic background
- Education: University of Connecticut (BA 1950); University of Pennsylvania (MA 1951); University of Wisconsin–Madison (PhD 1963)
- Doctoral advisor: Merle Curti

Academic work
- Discipline: Historian
- Sub-discipline: History of immigration to the United States; New social history
- Institutions: University of Minnesota (1967–2005)
- Doctoral students: Jon Gjerde

Rudolph John Vecoli (March 27, 1927 – June 17, 2008) was an American historian particularly known for his work on the history of immigration to the United States, who was professor at the University of Minnesota and served as director of Minnesota's interdisciplinary Immigration History Research Center 1967–2005. He was an Italian American, a founder and president of the American Italian Historical Association and of the Immigration and Ethnic History Society, and chairman of the history committee advising the Statue of Liberty-Ellis Island Foundation 1983–2003.

== Early life and education ==
Vecoli was born on March 27, 1927, in Wallingford, Connecticut, to Italian immigrant parents from Tuscany; he grew up speaking Italian at home. He served in the US Navy before earning a bachelor's in history from the University of Connecticut in 1950. He went on to earn a master's from the University of Pennsylvania in 1951 with work on the National Child Labor Committee and then, after several disillusioning years working in the State Department during the McCarthy era, a doctorate from the University of Wisconsin–Madison under the supervision of Merle Curti in 1963. His doctoral thesis was on Chicago's Italian immigrants.

== Career ==
Vecoli taught briefly at Rutgers University and the University of Illinois before joining the University of Minnesota in 1967 as a professor of history and director of a new Immigration History Research Center (IHRC), where he continued to work through his retirement in 2005. At Minnesota, his notable students included later University of California, Berkeley historian and social sciences dean Jon Gjerde (PhD 1982).

He was particularly recognized for his contributions to historiography of immigration and social history, such as the early paper "Contadini in Chicago: A Critique of The Uprooted" (1964) criticizing Oscar Handlin's The Uprooted. This work associated him with the New Social History movement.

Vecoli was a founder and later president of the American Italian Historical Association (president 1966–1970) and of the Immigration and Ethnic History Society (president 1982–1985). He was also chairman of the history committee advising the Statue of Liberty-Ellis Island Foundation for twenty years, 1983–2003.

== Death and legacy ==
Vecoli died on June 17, 2008, aged 81, in St. Louis Park, Minnesota.

The Italian Cultural Center of Minneapolis–St. Paul maintains a Rudi Vecoli library named in his honor.

== Selected works ==
=== Books ===
- The People of New Jersey (1965)
- Italian Immigrants in Rural and Small Town America (1987, editor)
- A Century of European Migrations, 1830–1930 (1991, editor)

=== Articles ===
- Vecoli, Rudolph J. (December 1964). "Contadini in Chicago: A Critique of The Uprooted". The Journal of American History. 51 (3): 404–417. doi:10.2307/1894893. JSTOR 1894893.
