= Merle Curti =

American historian (1897–1996)

- Born: Merle Eugene Curti; September 15, 1897; Papillion, Nebraska, U.S.
- Died: March 9, 1996 (aged 98); Madison, Wisconsin, U.S.
- Awards: Pulitzer Prize for History (1944)

Education
- Education: Harvard University (BA, PhD)
- Doctoral advisor: Frederick Jackson Turner

Philosophical work
- Institutions: University of Wisconsin–Madison; Columbia University; Smith College; Beloit College
- Notable students: Richard Hofstadter; John Higham; Roderick Nash; Rudolph J. Vecoli
- Main interests: social history, intellectual history
- Notable ideas: peace studies, new social history

Merle Eugene Curti (September 15, 1897 – March 9, 1996) was an American progressive historian who influenced peace studies, intellectual history and social history, including by using cliometrics (quantitative tools in historical research). At Columbia University and for decades at the University of Wisconsin, Curti directed 86 finished Ph.D. dissertations and had a wide range of correspondents. He was known for his commitment to democracy, as well as the Turnerian thesis that social and economic forces shape American life, thought and character.

== Early life and education ==
Curti was born in Papillion, Nebraska, a suburb of Omaha, on September 15, 1897. His parents were John Eugene Curti, an immigrant from Switzerland, and Alice Hunt, a Yankee from Vermont. Curti attended high school in Omaha then obtained a bachelor's degree in 1920 from Harvard University, graduating summa cum laude. While attending Harvard, after a mandatory enlistment in the fall of 1918, Curti was involved in the Military Corps. He then spent a year studying in France where he met Margaret Wooster (1898–1963) who had a Ph.D. from the University of Chicago and was a pioneer in research on child psychology. They married in 1925 and had two daughters. Curti received his Ph.D. in 1927 from Harvard as one of the last students of Frederick Jackson Turner.

== Academic career ==
While at Smith College, Curti published his first book, The American Peace Crusade, 1815–1860 (1929). The book, based on his dissertation, was written after Arthur M. Schlesinger, Sr. (who had replaced Turner at Harvard) rejected his first dissertation proposal which was essentially an early version of The Growth of American Thought.

Curti taught at Beloit College, Smith College, and Columbia University, then in 1942 he joined the faculty of the University of Wisconsin, where he taught for 25 years. He also taught in Japan, Australia, and India, and lectured throughout Europe.

=== Peace studies ===
Moving to Teachers College at Columbia in 1931, he published a book on William Jennings Bryan and world peace (Bryan and World Peace). It was followed by Peace or War: The American Struggle in 1936. With these works, Curti helped found peace and conflict studies as a field of study. He criticized pacifists for ignoring major social changes—especially the repudiation of old-fashioned competitive capitalism by the New Deal, and the need to repudiate imperial greed if peace were to be achieved. In 1964 he helped found the Conference on Peace Research in History, now called the Peace History Society. The Roots of American Loyalty (1946) was a history of patriotism.

Curti developed his global vision through travels; he taught in Japan, Australia and India for two years. He left the Episcopal faith of his boyhood for Unitarianism. Although never a Marxist, he voted for Socialist presidential candidates in the name of world peace.

=== Intellectual history ===
Curti turned his attention to intellectual history and helped to establish that field as a distinct academic discipline. His first foray in the field was The Social Ideals of American Educators, published in 1935. In 1944, Curti won the Pulitzer Prize in history for his masterwork, The Growth of American Thought. Its chapters show an encyclopedic knowledge of thinkers great and small from the colonial period to the present, together with his commitment to democracy as a process springing from the ideas of the people.

Curti adapted Turner's frontier thesis to intellectual history, arguing, "Because the American environment, physical and social, differed from that of Europe, Americans, confronted by different needs and problems, adapted the European intellectual heritage in their own way. And because American life came increasingly to differ from European life, American ideas, American agencies of intellectual life, and the use made of knowledge likewise came to differ in America from their European counterparts." (p vi)

Unlike some of the other leaders of the American Studies program, he paid little attention to myths and symbols. Unlike Perry Miller at Harvard, who strongly influenced a new generation of intellectual historians, Curti never delved too deeply into the internal history of ideas, preferring to link them to multiple external social and economic factors. His book was not so much a history of American thought as a social history of American thought, with strong attention to the social and economic forces that shaped that thought from the bottom up.

=== New social history ===
In the 1950s Curti undertook a collaborative social history of rural Trempealeau County, Wisconsin using avant-garde quantitative analysis of census records. The book which came out of the project, The Making of an American Community: A Case Study of Democracy in a Frontier County (1959) immediately became a pioneer work in what would soon be dubbed the "new social history." Curti's wife Margaret Wooster Curti, provided some of the quantitative methodology. Historians, however, did not emulate it, preferring instead to follow Stephan Thernstrom's model in Poverty and Progress: Social Mobility in a Nineteenth-Century American City (1964), which used a similar methodology of tracking workers through their careers using censuses and city directories. The difference was urban and rural—urban history was exploding, and rural history was a backwater; in addition, the Thernstrom model was easier to replicate by a graduate student writing a Ph.D. thesis alone (Curti had numerous research assistants and coauthors). Whereas the "old" social history comprised descriptions of everyday lifestyles, perhaps with a coverage of grass roots political movements (like the Populists), Curti's "new" social history was a systematic examination of the entire population using statistics and social science methodologies.

=== Teaching ===
In 1942, Curti was called to the Frederick Jackson Turner Professorship of History at the University of Wisconsin, one of the nation's most influential centers of historical scholarship; he retired from the department in 1968. Curti continued to write after retirement, keeping up to date his influential textbook Rise of the American Nation (1st ed. 1950), coauthored with Lewis Todd, which went through many editions after their deaths.

The Wisconsin department of history was notorious for the angry feuds among the senior professors, which Curti, mild-mannered and small of stature, completely ignored. Curti supervised 86 finished doctoral dissertations at Columbia and Wisconsin, including many who became well-known scholars: Richard Hofstadter on social Darwinism; John Higham on nativism; Bourke on community studies; Allen Davis on Progressivism and Jane Addams; Rudolph J. Vecoli on Italian immigrants in Chicago; and Roderick Nash on the environment. Curti allowed his students a free hand in content and methodology. He encouraged his students constantly, wrote highly detailed critiques of their chapters, protected them from intradepartmental feuds, helped them get funding, and found them jobs through the "old boys" network of which he was an accomplished maestro, writing hundreds of letters a month to friends and ex-students across the globe.

== Memberships, awards and honors ==
Curti won the Pulitzer Prize for History in 1944 for The Growth of American Thought (1943).

He was president of the Mississippi Valley Historical Association (now the Organization of American Historians) in 1952 and the American Historical Association in 1954.

He was a co-founder of the American Studies Association. He served as the organization's vice-president in 1954 and 1955, and was asked to serve as president in 1956, but he declined the honor because he was going to be out of the country.

Curti was also a member of the American Academy of Arts and Sciences and the American Philosophical Society.

In 1977 the Organization of American Historians established the Merle Curti Award, which is given annually for the best book in social, intellectual, and/or cultural history. (In some years, the organization has awarded two prizes, one in social and/or cultural history and one in intellectual and/or cultural history.)

== Selected works ==
- The American Peace Crusade, 1815–1860 (1929)
- "Non-Resistance in New England," The New England Quarterly Vol. 2, No. 1 (Jan., 1929), pp. 34–57 in JSTOR
- Bryan and World Peace. Northampton, Mass.: Smith College Studies in History, (1931).
- "Robert Rantoul, Jr., The Reformer in Politics," The New England Quarterly Vol. 5, No. 2 (Apr., 1932), pp. 264–280 in JSTOR
- The Social ideas of American Educators (1932, expanded ed. 1959)
- Peace or War: The American Struggle, 1636–1936 (1936).
- "The Great Mr. Locke: America's Philosopher, 1783–1861," The Huntington Library Bulletin No. 11 (Apr., 1937), pp. 107–151 JSTOR 3818115
- "Public Opinion and the Study of History," The Public Opinion Quarterly Vol. 1, No. 2 (Apr., 1937), pp. 84–87 in JSTOR
- "Francis Lieber and Nationalism," The Huntington Library Quarterly Vol. 4, No. 3 (Apr., 1941), pp. 263–292 in JSTOR
- "The American Scholar in Three Wars," Journal of the History of Ideas, Vol. 3, No. 3 (Jun., 1942), pp. 241–264 in JSTOR
- The Growth of American Thought. (1943, 1951), 912 pp.
- The University of Wisconsin A History 1848–1945 (3 vols., 1949–1994), with Vernon Rosco Carstenson, Edmund David Cronon, and John William Jenkins.
- The Roots of American Loyalty (1946)
- "The Reputation of America Overseas (1776–1860)," American Quarterly Vol. 1, No. 1 (Spring, 1949), pp. 58–82 in JSTOR
- "America at the World Fairs, 1851–1893," The American Historical Review Vol. 55, No. 4 (Jul., 1950), pp. 833–856 in JSTOR
- "The Immigrant and the American Image in Europe, 1860–1914," with Kendall Birr; The Mississippi Valley Historical Review Vol. 37, No. 2 (Sep., 1950), pp. 203–230 in JSTOR
- "The Democratic Theme in American Historical Literature," The Mississippi Valley Historical Review Vol. 39, No. 1 (Jun., 1952), pp. 3–28, presidential address; in JSTOR
- "'The Flowery Flag Devils': The American Image in China 1840–1900." with John Stalker; Proceedings of the American Philosophical Society Vol. 96, No. 6 (Dec., 1952), pp. 663–690 in JSTOR
- "Human Nature in American Thought," Political Science Quarterly Vol. 68, No. 3 (Sep., 1953), pp. 354–375 in JSTOR
- "Human Nature in American Thought: Retreat from Reason in the Age of Science," Political Science Quarterly Vol. 68, No. 4 (Dec., 1953), pp. 492–510 in JSTOR
- "Intellectuals and Other People," The American Historical Review Vol. 60, No. 2 (Jan., 1955), pp. 259–282, presidential address in JSTOR
- "Woodrow Wilson's Concept of Human Nature," Midwest Journal of Political Science Vol. 1, No. 1 (May, 1957), pp. 1–19 in JSTOR
- "American Philanthropy and the National Character," American Quarterly Vol. 10, No. 4 (Winter, 1958), pp. 420–437 in JSTOR
- The Making of an American Community: A Case Study of Democracy in a Frontier County. (1959).
- "Tradition and Innovation in American Philanthropy," Proceedings of the American Philosophical Society Vol. 105, No. 2 (Apr., 1961), pp. 146–156 in JSTOR
- "Jane Addams on Human Nature," Journal of the History of Ideas Vol. 22, No. 2 (Apr., 1961), pp. 240–253 in JSTOR
- "The Changing Concept of "Human Nature" in the Literature of American Advertising," The Business History Review Vol. 41, No. 4 (Winter, 1967), pp. 335–357, illustrated; in JSTOR
- Human Nature in American Thought: A History (1980)
- American Philanthropy Abroad (Jan. 1, 1988)
- Rise of the American Nation, textbook coauthored with Lewis Paul Todd (1950–1982); many editions.
