= Erika Lee =

American historian

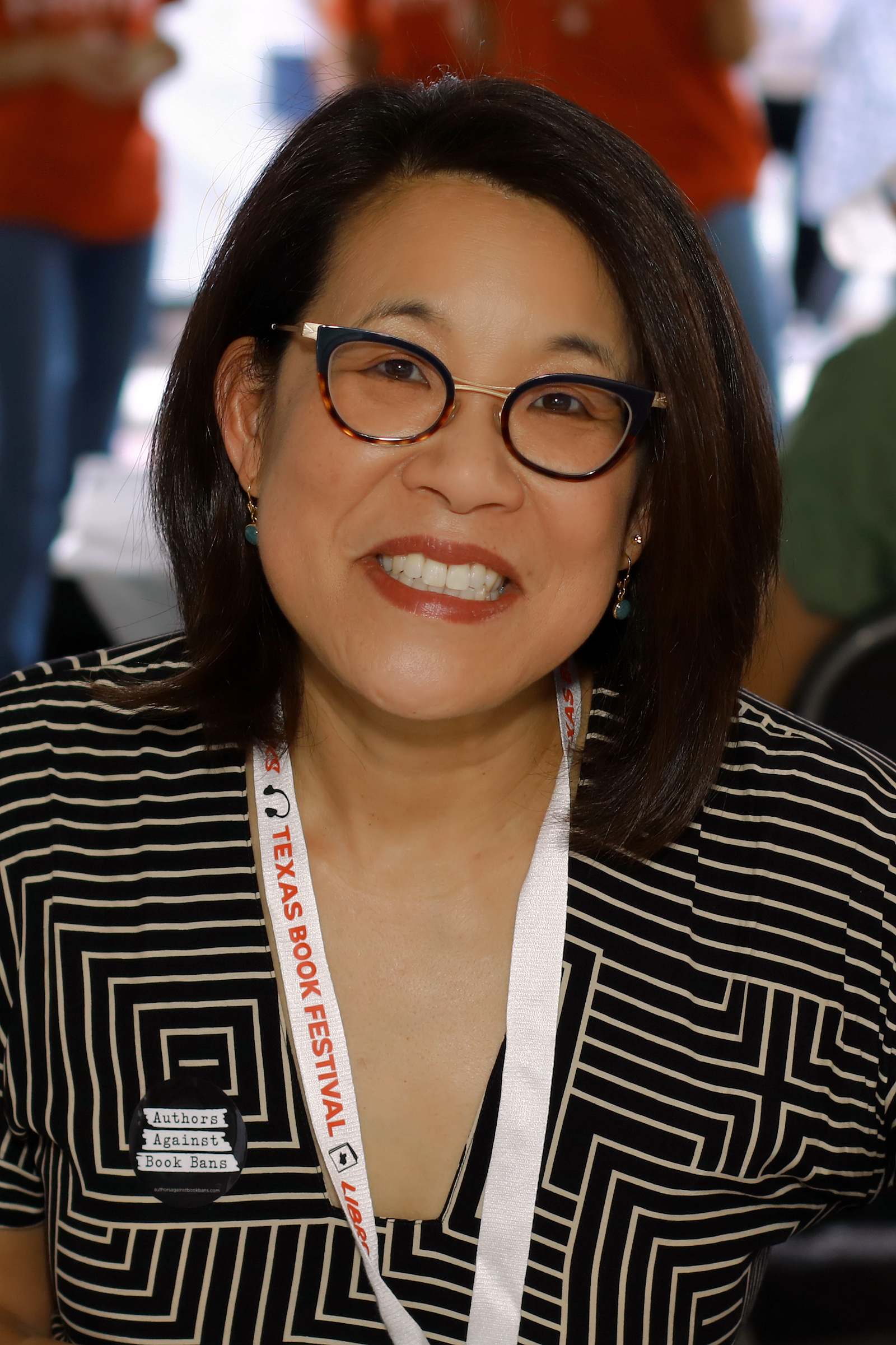
- Lee at the 2024 Texas Book Festival
- Education: Tufts University (BA); University of California, Berkeley (MA, PhD)
- Genres: Nonfiction; History
- Notable awards: Caughey Western History Association Prize

Erika Lee is a historian and author. She is currently the inaugural Bae Family Professor of History at Harvard University, a position she began in July 2023. In addition, she is still active as an award-winning author, known for her non-fiction work upon the subjects of immigration and Asian American history in America. Previously, she was the Rudolph J. Vecoli Chair and Director of the Immigration History Research Center at the University of Minnesota.

== Early life and education ==
Lee is the granddaughter of Chinese immigrants, growing up in the San Francisco Bay Area. Lee attended Tufts University before continuing her studies at the University of California, Berkeley, where she earned an M.A. in 1993 and a PhD in 1998.

== Career ==
Erika Lee served as the director of Undergraduate Studies at the University of Minnesota throughout 2003-2006, in addition to directing the Asian Studies Program (2009-2012), and the Immigration History Research Center and Archives(2012).

During her time at the University of Minnesota, she has also founded, written and edited for multiple online humanities projects that include but are not limited to: Immigrants in COVID America, Immigrant Stories, and the #ImmigrationSyllabus.

Recently, Erika Lee has accepted the position of the inaugural Bae Family Professor of History at Harvard University in 2023.

As an author, Erika Lee is noted to have written five non-fiction books, for which she has received multiple awards such as the American Book Award and the Asian/Pacific American Award for Literature. Her most recent work is Made in Asian America: A History for Young People (2024), cowritten with Newberry-award winning author Christina Soontornvat.

== Published works ==
=== Books ===
- Lee, Erika (2003). At America's Gates: Chinese Immigration during the Exclusion Era, 1882–1943. Chapel Hill: The University of North Carolina Press. ISBN 978-0807827758.
- —; Yung, Judy (2010). Angel Island: Immigrant Gateway to America. New York: Oxford University Press. ISBN 978-0199734085.
- — (2016). The Making of Asian America: A History. New York: Simon & Schuster. ISBN 978-1476739403.
- — (2019). America for Americans: A History of Xenophobia in the United States. New York: Basic Books. ISBN 978-1541672604.
- —; Soontornvat, Christina (April 30, 2024). Made in Asian America: a History for Young People. Quill Tree Books. ISBN 978-0-06-324293-7.

=== Contributions ===
- Lee, Erika (2011). "Chapter 1: A Nation of Immigrants and a Gatekeeping Nation: American Immigration Law and Policy" In Reed, Ueda (eds.). A companion to American immigration. Malden, Mass.: Wiley-Blackwell. ISBN 978-0-631-22843-1.
- — (2004). "Chapter 6: American Gatekeeping: Race and Immigration Law in the Twentieth Century". In Foner, Nancy; Fredrickson, George M. (eds.). Not Just Black and White: Historical and Contemporary Perspectives on Immigration, Race, and Ethnicity in the United States. New York: Russell Sage Foundation. pp. 119–144. ISBN 978-0871542595. JSTOR 10.7758/9781610442114.
- — (2010). "Chapter 9: The Chinese Are Coming. How Can We Stop Them? Chinese Exclusion and the Origins of American Gatekeeping". In Yu-Wen Shen Wu, Jean; Chen, Thomas (eds.). Asian American Studies Now: A Critical Reader. New Brunswick: Rutgers University Press. pp. 143–167. ISBN 978-0813545745. JSTOR j.ctt1bmzn3s.
- — (2012). "Chapter 11: The "Yellow Peril" in the United States and Peru: A Transnational History of Japanese Exclusion, 1920s–World War II". In Fojas, Camilla; Guevarra, Rudy P. (eds.). Transnational Crossroads: Remapping the Americas and the Pacific. Lincoln: University of Nebraska Press. pp. 315–358. doi:10.2307/j.ctt1ddr6mv. ISBN 978-0803237957. JSTOR j.ctt1ddr6mv.

=== Journal articles ===
- Lee, Erika (1999). "Immigrants and Immigration Law: A State of the Field Assessment". Journal of American Ethnic History. 18 (4): 85–114. JSTOR 27502472.
- — (2002). "The Chinese Exclusion Example: Race, Immigration, and American Gatekeeping, 1882–1924". Journal of American Ethnic History. 21 (3): 36–62. doi:10.2307/27502847. JSTOR 27502847. S2CID 157999472.
- — (2002). "Enforcing the Borders: Chinese Exclusion along the U.S. Borders with Canada and Mexico, 1882–1924". The Journal of American History. 89 (1): 54–86. doi:10.2307/2700784. JSTOR 2700784.
- — (2007). "The "Yellow Peril" and Asian Exclusion in the Americas". Pacific Historical Review. 76 (4): 537–562. doi:10.1525/phr.2007.76.4.537. JSTOR 10.1525/phr.2007.76.4.537. S2CID 145388977.
- — (2015). "A Part and Apart: Asian American and Immigration History". Journal of American Ethnic History. 34 (4): 28–42. doi:10.5406/jamerethnhist.34.4.0028. JSTOR 10.5406/jamerethnhist.34.4.0028.
- —; Gabaccia, Donna (2017). "The Role of the Public Historian: An Interview with Donna Gabaccia". Journal of American Ethnic History. 37 (1): 70–77. doi:10.5406/jamerethnhist.37.1.0070. JSTOR 10.5406/jamerethnhist.37.1.0070.

== Awards ==
- 2015 Immigrant Heritage Award in Education from the Angel Island Immigration Station Foundation
- 2016 Asian Pacific American Librarians Association Awards for The Making of Asian America: a History
- 2018 Andrew Carnegie Fellowship
- 2018 Distinguished Historian Award from the Society for Historians of the Gilded Age and Progressive Era
- 2018 Distinguished Lecturer in the Organization of American Historians
- 2019 Honoree of the Richard Frisbie Award from the Society of Midland Authors.
- 2020 American Book Awards
