= Margaret Wooster Curti =

American psychologist (1892-1961)

- Born: Margaret Wooster; February 8, 1892; Silver Creek, Nebraska
- Died: September 19, 1961 (aged 69); Madison, Wisconsin
- Education: University of Nebraska, University of Chicago
- Occupations: psychologist, researcher

Margaret Wooster Curti (February 8, 1892 – September 19, 1961) was an American child psychologist, researcher and author.

Curti nee Wooster was born in Silver Creek, Nebraska on February 8, 1892. She attended the University of Nebraska where she studied inder Harry Kirke Wolfe, and the University of Chicago where she studied under Harvey A. Carr, earning her PhD in 1920. In 1925 she married fellow academic Merle Curti with whom she had two children.

She taught at Smith College from 1922 through 1937, Teachers College, Columbia University from 1937 through 1942, and then briefly at University of Wisconsin–Madison.

In 1930 Longmans, Green & Co. published her book Child psychology.

Curti researched cultural bias in testing, disputing the idea that race or economic class effect a child's intelligence.

Curti died in Madison, Wisconsin on September 19, 1961.

Her papers are in the Sophia Smith Collection at Smith College.
