= Jon Gjerde =

American historian (1953–2008)

- Born: February 25, 1953; Waterloo, Iowa, U.S.
- Died: October 26, 2008 (aged 55); Albany, California, U.S.
- Occupation: Historian
- Known for: From Peasants to Farmers: The Migration from Balestrand, Norway, to the Upper Middle West (1989); The Minds of the West: Ethnocultural Evolution in the Rural Middle West, 1830–1917 (1997)

Academic background
- Education: University of Northern Iowa (BA 1975); University of Minnesota (MA 1978, PhD 1982)
- Doctoral advisor: Rudolph J. Vecoli

Academic work
- Discipline: Historian
- Sub-discipline: History of the Midwestern United States; European immigration to the Americas
- Institutions: University of California, Berkeley (1985–2008)

Jon Gjerde (February 25, 1953 – October 26, 2008) was an American historian known for his work on the ethnic and agricultural aspects of European immigration to the Midwestern United States. He was the Morrison Professor of American History and American Citizenship at the University of California, Berkeley, where he also served as chair of the history department (2001–2004) and dean of the Division of Social Sciences in the College of Letters and Science (2007–2008).

== Early life and education ==
Gjerde was born on February 25, 1953, in Waterloo, Iowa, and grew up in Cedar Falls, Iowa, the youngest of three children in a family of Norwegian immigrants. His father, Waldemar Gjerde, was a professor of education at the University of Northern Iowa, but died when Jon Gjerde was young; his mother was a schoolteacher. Gjerde himself attended the University of Northern Iowa, and graduated in 1975 with a triple major in history, philosophy, and religion. He went on to graduate studies in history at the University of Minnesota, earning a master's degree in 1978 and a Ph.D. in 1982 under the supervision of Rudolph J. Vecoli.

== Career ==
After teaching at the University of Minnesota, the University of Wisconsin, and the California Institute of Technology, Gjerde joined the UC Berkeley faculty in 1985. He was tenured in 1989 and served as resident director of a University of California study abroad program at Lund University in Sweden from 1991 to 1992. He served as chair of the history department at UC Berkeley from 2001 to 2004, then was named interim dean of social sciences in 2006 and confirmed as dean in 2007. In 2007, he rose to the named chair the Alexander F. and May T. Morrison Professor of American History and American Citizenship.

Gjerde's research concerned European immigration to the Midwestern United States and European immigrants in the midwest. Among other accolades, Gjerde won three book awards named for Theodore Saloutos for his writings on immigration and agricultural history, two from the Immigration and Ethnic History Society and one from the Agricultural History Society. He was most commonly associated with his two prizewinning books, From Peasants to Farmers: The Migration from Balestrand, Norway, to the Upper Middle West (1989), which won the Immigration and Ethnic History Society Saloutos Award, and The Minds of the West: Ethnocultural Evolution in the Rural Middle West, 1830–1917 (1997), which won both the Immigration and Ethnic History Society and Agricultural History Society Saloutos Awards.

== Death and legacy ==
Gjerde died on October 26, 2008, at his home in Albany, California. Like his father, he died in his 50s of a heart attack.

In his memory, the Jon and Ruth Gjerde Graduate Student Endowment was established to benefit the UC Berkeley History Department. The Midwestern History Association has also named an annual prize for the best book in the field in his honor, the Jon Gjerde Prize.

== Selected works ==
- Gjerde, Jon (1985), From Peasants to Farmers: The Migration from Balestrand, Norway, to the Upper Middle West, Cambridge University Press, ISBN 978-0-521-36822-3. Reviewed in J. Historical Geography doi:10.1016/S0305-7488(86)80068-8, American Historical Review doi:10.2307/1867391, Economic History Review doi:10.2307/2596335, J. Interdisciplinary History doi:10.2307/204807, International Migration Review doi:10.2307/2546119, Continuity and Change doi:10.1017/S0268416000003817, and J. American History doi:10.2307/1908949.
- Gjerde, Jon (1997), The Minds of the West: Ethnocultural Evolution in the Rural Middle West, 1830–1917, UNC Press, ISBN 978-0-8078-4807-4. Reviewed in J. American History doi:10.2307/2952614, American Historical Review doi:10.2307/2170766, Western Historical Quarterly doi:10.2307/969905, International Migration Review doi:10.2307/2547550, American Anthropologist doi:10.1525/aa.1997.99.4.866, and Rural History doi:10.1017/S0956793300001606.
- Gjerde, Jon, ed. (1998), Major Problems in American Immigration and Ethnic History, Houghton Mifflin, ISBN 978-0-395-81532-8. This is an edited anthology of primary sources and excerpts from scholars.
- Gjerde, Jon; Qualey, Carlton C. (2002), Norwegians in Minnesota, The People of Minnesota, Minnesota Historical Society Press, ISBN 978-0-87351-421-7.
