= Alberto Zum Felde =

Uruguayan historian, critic and essayist

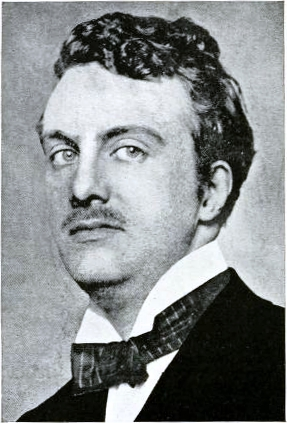
Alberto Zum Felde, c. 1921.

Alberto Zum Felde (Bahía Blanca, 30 May 1887, 1888 or 1889 – Montevideo, 6 May 1976) was a Uruguayan historian, critic and essayist.

As shown by Arturo Ardao, Zum Felde is very relevant among the currents of thought of philosophy of culture in the Americas.

He was one of the nine founding members of the Uruguayan Academy of Letters.

== Selected works ==
- El Huanakauri (1917).
- Proceso histórico del Uruguay: esquema de una sociología nacional (1919).
- Crítica de la literatura uruguaya (1921).
- Estética del 900 (1929).
- Proceso intelectual del Uruguay: crítica de su literatura (1930).
- Índice de la poesía uruguaya contemporánea (1933).
- Alción. Misterio en tres cielos (1934).
- Aula Magna o la Sibyla y el filósofo (1937).
- La literatura del Uruguay (1939).
- El ocaso de la democracia (1939).
- El problema de la cultura americana (1943).
- Índice crítico de la literatura hispanoamericana: la ensayística (1954).
- Índice crítico de la literatura hispanoamericana: la narrativa (1959).
- Cristo y nosotros. El problema religioso y la cultura contemporánea (1959).
- Diálogo Cristo-Marx (1971).
