= Diccionario de argentinismos =

Diccionario de argentinismos is an authoritative dictionary of the Spanish language as occurring in Argentina prior to 1911. It was published in 1911 under the auspices of the Comisión Nacional del Centenario (Argentine National Commission on the Centenary) and printed in Buenos Aires by Imprenta de Coni Hermanos (Coni Brothers Press).

The introduction begins with a discussion of the merits of the Diccionario de la lengua española de la Real Academia Española (DRAE), except that DRAE has insufficient coverage of Spanish as spoken in Argentina. Diccionario de argentinismos lists 15,000 terms and senses not in DRAE, and many additional phrases.
