= European immigration to the Americas =

European immigration to the Americas was one of the largest migratory movements in human history. Between the years 1492 and 1930, more than 60 million Europeans immigrated to the American continent. Between 1492 and 1820, approximately 2.6 million Europeans immigrated to the Americas, of whom just under 50% were either British or Irish, 40% were Spanish or Portuguese, 6% were Swiss or German, and 5% were French.

But it was in the 19th century and in the first half of the 20th century that European immigration to the Americas reached its historic peak. Never before in human history have so many people immigrated to another continent. Between 1815 and 1930, 60 million Europeans emigrated, of which 71% went to Northern America, 21% to Latin America, and 7% to Australia. This mass immigration had as a backdrop economic and social problems in the Old World, allied to structural changes that facilitated the migratory movement between the two continents. British people and Iberians continued to immigrate, but influxes from other parts of Europe, particularly Germany, Italy, Ireland, Austria-Hungary, the Russian Empire and Scandinavian countries also became numerous.

== Immigration history ==
=== Between 1492 and 1640 ===
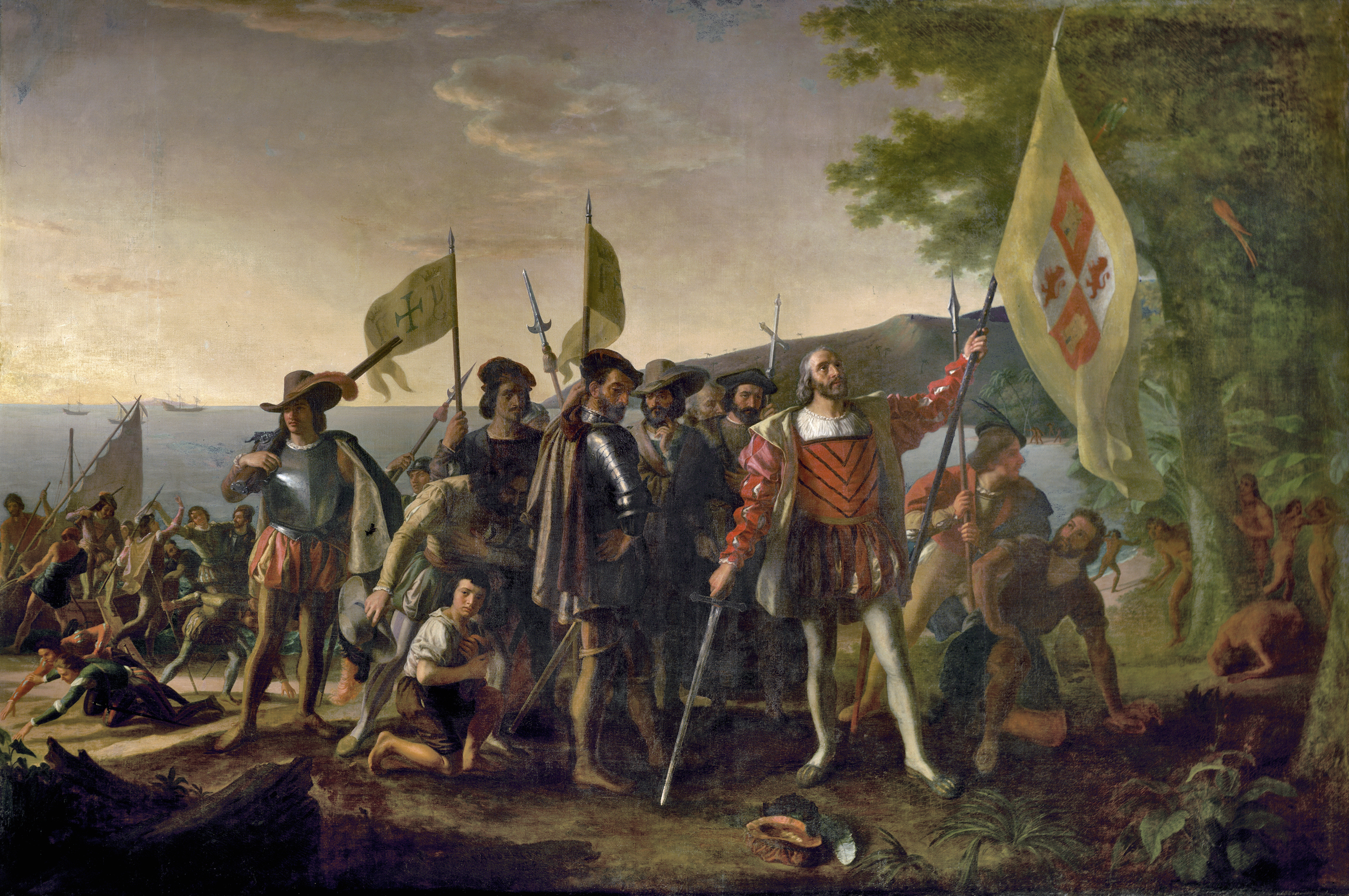
Landing of Columbus by John Vanderlyn, 1847

European immigration to the Americas, 1492–1640
Country of origin	Number
Portugal	200,000
Spain	190,000
Great Britain	50,000
France	4,000
Netherlands	2,000
Total	446,000

Between 1492 and 1640, approximately 446,000 Europeans immigrated to the Americas. At that stage, immigration was dominated by Portuguese and Spaniards, who accounted for 87% of the settlers who left Europe. In the late 15th and early 16th centuries, the decision by Spanish and Portuguese monarchs to take possession of the New World and establish crown-governed colonies required the transfer of large numbers of colonists. The plundering of Native American societies and the Spanish discoveries of silver mines in Potosí, in Upper Peru, and Zacatecas, in Mexico, in the 1540s, provided a significant stimulus to immigration. In the long run, however, the most important development that encouraged large-scale immigration of settlers from Europe was the production of consumer goods in high demand in Europe, most notably sugar and, to a lesser extent, tobacco.

In the Americas, Portuguese Brazil (specifically the northeastern captaincies of Pernambuco and Bahia) emerged as the epicenter of world sugar production around 1600. Brazil was followed half a century later by a new sugar plantation complex founded by the British and French (supported by Dutch merchants) on the islands of Barbados, Saint Kitts and Nevis, Martinique and Guadeloupe, in the West Indies. Meanwhile, in Chesapeake, the English colonies of Virginia and Maryland began to rapidly expand tobacco production during the 1620s and 1630s. At that time, plantation-based colonies absorbed the vast majority of European immigrants (and enslaved Africans).

During the 16th century and the first half of the 17th century, the origins of Spanish immigrants were strongly drawn from the Spanish southwest, with the majority of settlers coming from Andalusia, Extremadura and Castile. Andalusia alone contributed a third to a half of all immigrants from Spain. However, in the late 17th and early 18th centuries, the character of Spanish emigration changed dramatically, with much greater numbers moving from the poorer north coast provinces (Galicia, Cantabria and the Basque Country), from the east (Catalonia) and the Balearic and Canary Islands. In the case of Brazil, in the first century of colonization, settlers came mainly from the Lisbon region, but later they came mainly from Northern Portugal (Trás-os-Montes and Entre Douro e Minho).

=== Between 1640 and 1760 ===
European immigration to the Americas, 1640–1760
Country of origin	Number
Great Britain	592,000
Portugal	300,000
Spain	160,000
Germany	97,000
France	96,000
Netherlands	18,000
Total	1,263,000

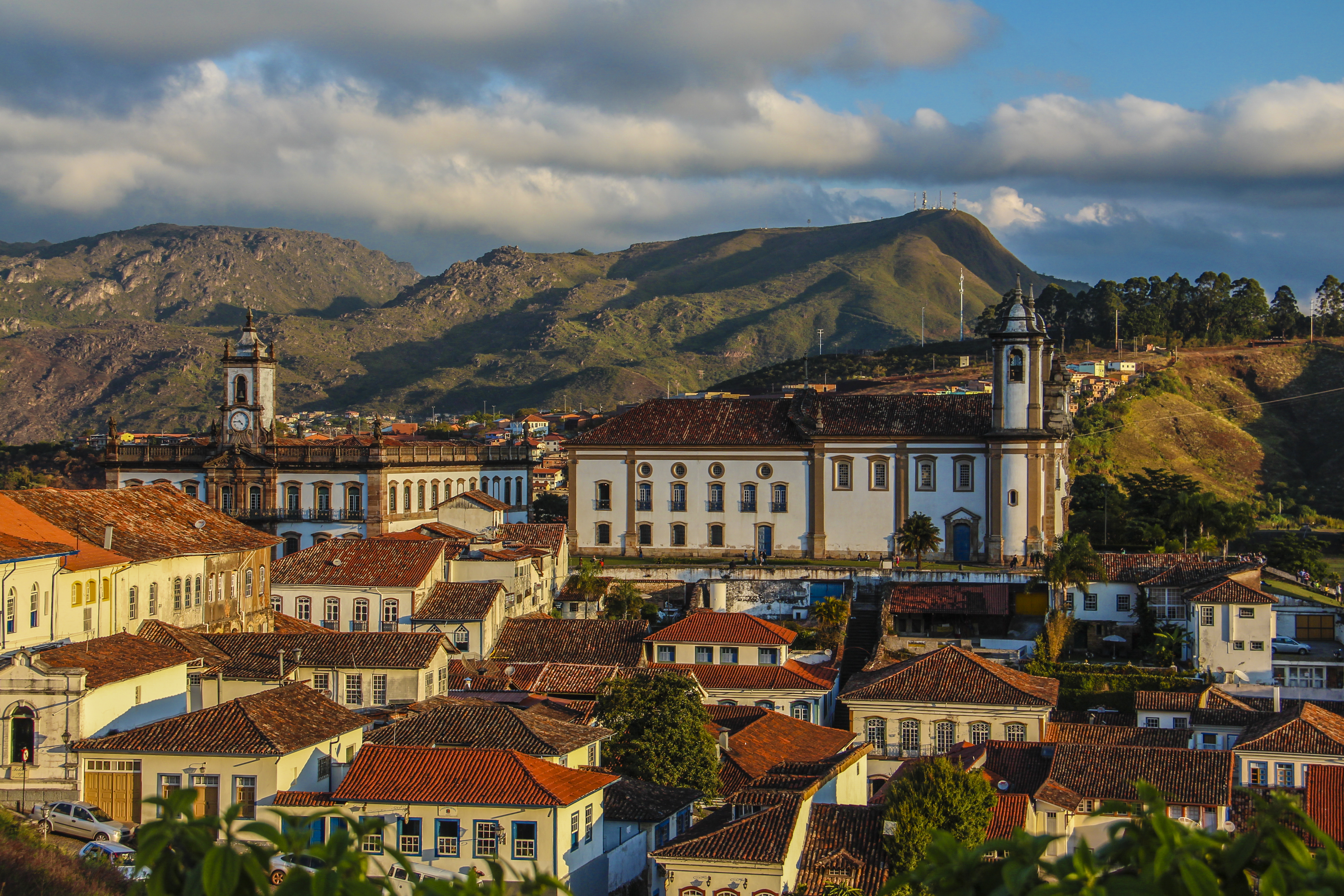
In the 18th century, Ouro Preto, then Vila Rica, became one of the largest cities in the Americas. Portuguese emigration to Brazil was so intense that the Portuguese government limited emigration in 1720 to avoid the depopulation of Portugal.

In the second phase, from 1640 to 1760, European immigration to the Americas tripled and British immigration surpassed the Spanish and Portuguese one. During this period, close to 1.3 million colonists left Europe for the New World. Most of the 350,000 English immigrants who crossed the Atlantic, during the 17th century, went to the West Indies (180,000) and to the Chesapeake Colonies, in the southern United States (120,000). Only about 23,000 went to the North American-Central colonies and 21,000 to New England.

Portugal and Spain had no difficulty finding citizens who were willing to emigrate to their colonies in the Americas, so that Iberian emigration to the Americas was predominantly spontaneous. The supply of Portuguese and Spanish people willing to emigrate was so high that the Spanish and Portuguese governments even had to restrict emigration to the Americas (very early Spain had restricted emigration to the Spanish West Indies and Portugal had to pass three laws prohibiting the migration of people from the Portuguese Northwest to Brazil, in the years 1709, 1711 and 1720, to contain the large numbers of Portuguese who were going to Minas Gerais, during the Brazilian Gold Rush). Gold from Minas Gerais produced an era of economic prosperity not only in the Minas Gerais region, but also on the Brazilian coast. Regarding the law enacted in 1720, Portuguese authorities stated: "Having been the most populated, Minho today is a state in which there are not enough people to cultivate the land or provide for the inhabitants".

However, this was not the case in Great Britain, France and the Netherlands, nations that had difficulties in recruiting settlers and had to resort to forced or semi-voluntary immigration. It is often said that Portugal had difficulties in populating Brazil and that it sent Portuguese criminals for that purpose. However, this statement is not true, as the number of Portuguese willing to emigrate to Brazil voluntarily has always been large. In fact, sending prisoners to their colonies was a more common practice in British colonization, not in the Portuguese one.

More than 65% of the 600,000 British who immigrated to the Americas before 1780 arrived as forced laborers, and over 60,000 were condemned prisoners. In the Antilles, the French authorities had to appeal to volunteers (engagés) and prisoners to maintain a European presence in their colonies. To populate Quebec and Louisiana, the French government had to recruit engages, soldiers and women in orphanages and asylums (the Filles du Roi). The Netherlands had to recruit sailors from the East and West India companies (half of whom were not Dutch), as well as soldiers, forced laborers, orphans and foreigners to populate its colonies.

Therefore, European immigrants of this period can be divided into two groups: those who arrived free and those who were subject to some form of contractual work obligation. Of the latter, the vast majority were indentured servants (British), engages (French) and redemptioners (Germans), who added up to about half a million immigrants, between 1500 and 1800. Convicts and political prisoners contributed another 129,000 immigrants. In addition, there were an undetermined number of men and women who were serfs (e.g. Spanish servants) in the service of a civil servant, priest or gentleman, but who might have been of relatively high social standing.

Many of the British, French, Swiss and German settlers who immigrated during that period were bound by a employment contract, which normally required them to work for four to seven years, in return for the cost of passage, food and lodging, and certain payments called "freedom dues". Freedom dues were paid by the master to the servant, upon completion of the term of service, and normally took the form of provisions, clothing, tools, land rights, money, or a small part of the harvest (tobacco or sugar).

Even though it is impossible to specify the proportion of Europeans who arrived in the Americas as non-free workers, certainly no less than 25% of them were serfs, convicts or prisoners. During the peak years of serf emigration, in the second half of the 17th century, the proportion was around 50%. Between 1620 and 1700, indentured servants made up between 70 and 85 percent of the settlers who emigrated to the Chesapeake and to the British West Indies.

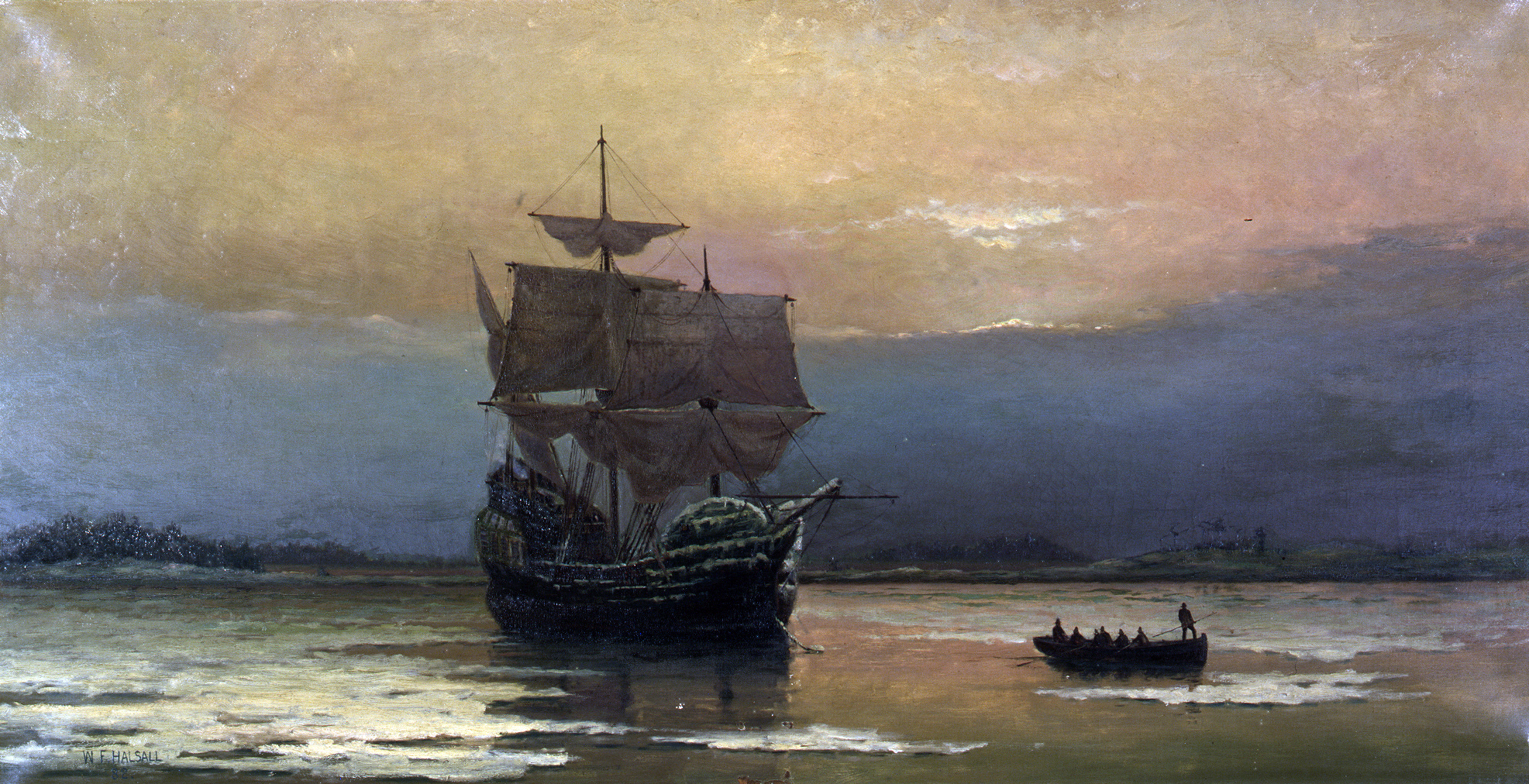
Mayflower bringing one of the first groups of English settlers to North America

The vast majority of settlers were young (between 16 and 25 years old), male and single. In the 16th century, Spanish females never accounted for more than 30% of the total immigrants. Over three-quarters of the serfs who left England in the 17th century were men or boys, rising to over 90% between 1718 and 1775. Of the French 'engages' who left Nantes and Bordeaux in the early 18th century, over 90% were men and between 67 and 70% were 19 years of age or younger. It is often claimed that British colonists arrived in the Americas in family groups, bringing wives. However, the proportion of women was only high in exceptional cases, such as the Puritans who emigrated to New England and the Quakers to Pennsylvania. The proportion of women among British immigrants was similar to that among Portuguese and Spanish immigrants: between 20 and 25% of the total. Men constituted the absolute majority in almost all migratory flows.

=== Between 1760 and 1820 ===
European immigration to the Americas, 1760–1820
Country of origin	Number
Great Britain	615,000
Portugal	105,000
Spain	70,000
Germany	51,000
France	20,000
Netherlands	5,000
Others	5,000
Total	871,000

The final phase of colonial immigration, from 1760 to 1820, became dominated by free settlers and was marked by a huge increase in British immigrants to North America and the United States in particular. In that period, 871,000 Europeans immigrated to the Americas, of which over 70% were British (including Irish in that category). Many independent farmers and tenants emigrated to establish farms and plantations, as well as craftsmen.

In the first century of colonization, most settlers in the Thirteen Colonies (present-day United States) came from the southwest of England. However, in the 18th century, the origins of the settlers became more diverse, with many coming from the Celtic periphery and Germany (35% Irish, including Scots-Irish from Ulster, 12% Scots and 27% Germans). As Germans had no colonies in the region, attention is drawn to the large number of Germans who emigrated to the Americas before 1820, a larger number than the French and Dutch, who had colonies. These Germans went to the British colonies, most of whom were recruited in the Rhineland region and arrived as indentured servants, as did most of the British colonists.

In turn, the Portuguese and Spanish governments did not tolerate the presence of foreigners in their colonies. In Brazil, the Portuguese implemented a policy of preventing other Europeans from settling in their colony, by closing the ports and destroying any foreign vessel that tried to anchor in Brazilian lands. It was only in 1808, with the Decree Opening Ports to Friendly Nations, that non-Portuguese immigration to Brazil was allowed. The Spanish immigration policy was so strict that the Spanish government prohibited the entry not only of foreigners in its colonies, but also of Spaniards who were descendants, up to the second degree, of Jew and Muslim converts, as well as of Spaniards who were not subjects of the Kingdom of Castile, and even subjects had to have special authorizations to emigrate to the colonies.

=== Between 1820 and 1930 ===
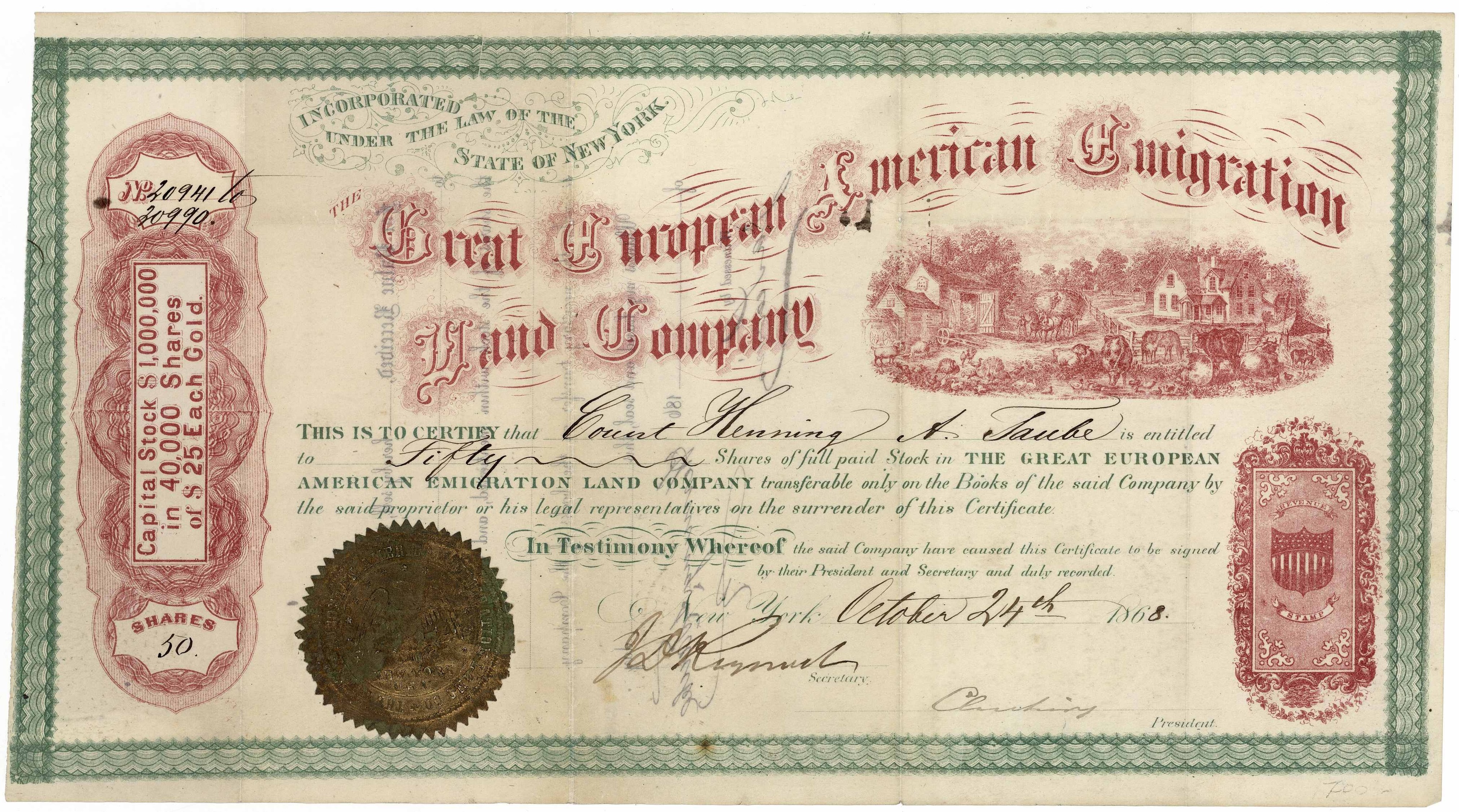
Share of the Great European American Emigration Land Company, issued 2. October 1868, signed by president Caleb Cushing.

European immigration to the United States (1820–1978)
Country	Arrivals	% of total
Germany^{1}	6,978,000	14.3%
Italy	5,294,000	10.9%
Great Britain	4,898,000	10.0%
Ireland	4,723,000	9.7%
Austria-Hungary^{1,} ^{2}	4,315,000	8.9%
Russia^{1,} ^{2}	3,374,000	6.9%
Sweden	1,272,000	2.6%
Norway	856,000	1.8%
France	751,000	1.5%
Greece	655,000	1.3%
Portugal	446,000	0.9%
Denmark	364,000	0.7%
Netherlands	359,000	0.7%
Finland	33,000	0.1%
Total (158 yrs)	34,318,000	
Source: Note: Many returned to their country of origin

European immigration to the Americas reached its peak when most countries had already gained their independence. About 60 million Europeans emigrated between 1820 and 1930, although the period of greatest migratory volume was between 1870 and 1913. The transformations that took place in Europe, as a result of the expansion of industrialization and economic modernization, together with extraordinary improvements in the transport and communication systems, allowed millions of workers to move from Europe, abundant in labor, to the so-called New World countries, where the supply of land was abundant and capital and labour force were scarce.

There were several factors that led to massive European immigration between 1820 and 1930. Technological advances in the 19th century made travel between Europe and the Americas much faster and safer. The modernization of the set of rules and principles that govern the Stock Exchange and the Banks facilitated the investment of capital in other parts of the world. The internationalization of the market favored the arrival of products from the New World, mainly cereals, at very competitive prices. This caused losses in the European agricultural sector, which at times led to crises, causing the population to emigrate. Furthermore, in the 19th century there was an enormous population growth in the European continent, together with the progressive drop in mortality (a phenomenon known as "demographic transition"), which exerted pressure on the agricultural sector. These changes made access to land difficult for peasant populations, as the number of people who had to survive from the production of the same plot of land increased. Many Europeans were literally starving. For example, in the 1840s, about one million Irish starved to death, due to a combination of agricultural plague and economic disaster, and about two million emigrated to survive, between 1845 and 1855.

Furthermore, in the 19th century, information began to circulate more freely. According to Herbet Klein, "after 1870 migration flows and economic conditions in America were closely related. Information on conditions of employment, in particular, was now readily available within a few weeks in the main European countries of emigration". There is a consensus among authors that immigrants went to destinations where the amount of resources offered was greater than in their homelands.

It was no coincidence that the United States was, by far, the country that received the most immigrants during this period. Between 1815 and 1930, more than 32 million Europeans chose the United States as their destination country. The growth of the North American economy demonstrated a capacity to absorb manpower unprecedented in human history. However, the impact of immigration on the host societies of Uruguay and Argentina was particularly significant, given the relatively small size of their populations at the time they experienced the influx of migrants, predominantly from Spain and Italy. By 1860, 34% of Uruguay's population was composed of foreign-born individuals. By 1908, this figure had declined to 17.4%, with the majority of the population being descendants of immigrants who had settled in earlier decades. Similarly, in Argentina, it is estimated that by 1914, 30% of the population was of foreign origin.

Emigration was part of an economic strategy. Through the emigration of one of its members, the family diversified its risks, since it "invested" in several markets at the same time, sharing costs (financing the trip) and benefits (sending remittances to the family). The remittances also served to finance the trip of potential emigrants. Thus, both temporary emigration and sending remittances formed a migratory strategy that presents high knowledge of labor markets and living conditions in the host countries on the part of immigrants. The degree of information that has been achieved in many European regions about labor markets in American countries shows not only all the mechanisms for transmitting information to potential emigrants (immigration chains, family, friends) but also a perfectly integrated international labor market, although segmented in terms of choice of destinations.

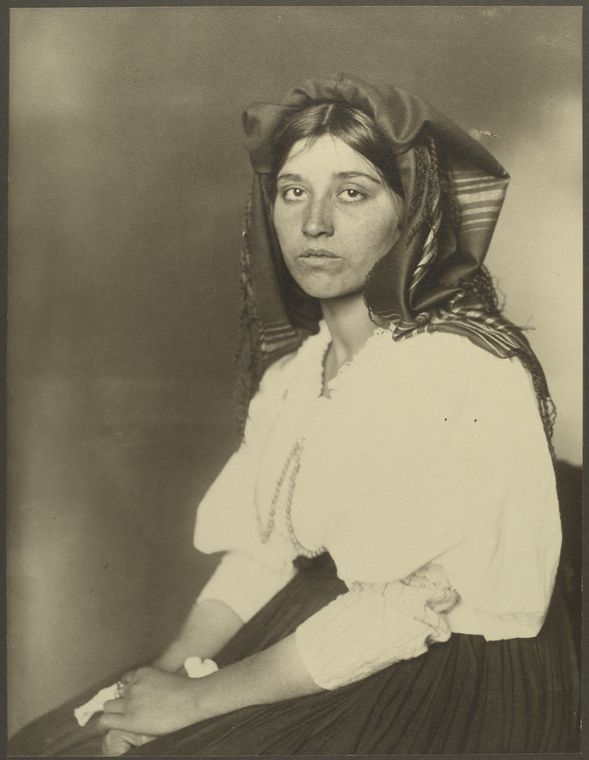
An Italian immigrant photographed in the United States (1906)

European immigration to Latin America (1820–1960)
Country	Arrivals	% of total
Italy	6,710,000	39.9%
Spain	5,380,000	32%
Portugal	1,850,000	11%
Germany	470,000	2.8%
Jews from Eastern Europe	420,000	2.5%
Levant	410,000	2.4%
France	360,000	2.1%
Others from Europe	1,220,000	7.3%
Total	16,820,000	100%

Countries that achieved high emigration rates in the mid-19th century were Great Britain, Ireland, Germany, and the Scandinavian countries. From the 1880s onwards, Mediterranean Europe, led by Italy, and Eastern Europe had the highest emigration rates and peaked in the years before World War I.

The Irish and British mostly chose the United States as their destination country, as did the Scandinavians. Secondarily, they opted for Canada, which received 5 million immigrants, between 1820 and 1932. In turn, Italians diversified their destinations according to their regional origins: emigrants from Northern Italy chose mainly Latin American countries, while those from the South emigrated to the United States preferentially. The Spaniards opted almost exclusively for emigration to Latin American countries and very little to the United States and the Portuguese opted preferentially for Brazil.

From the 19th century onwards, the geographical origins of immigrants changed. In previous centuries, the British had been the most numerous in the United States, but German immigration overtook British after 1820, and, in Latin America, Spanish and Portuguese immigrants, dominant in all previous centuries, were overtaken by the Italians. Regions that had never sent immigrants to the Americas, such as Eastern Europe, were now also present.

During the time of great immigration, the destination countries not only did not put up legal obstacles to the entry of foreign workers, but many of them carried out active policies to attract labor. The most striking case is that of Brazil, where, after the abolition of slavery in the 1880s and fearing a shortage of workers in coffee cultivation, the government of the state of São Paulo undertook an ambitious program of subsidized immigration for European workers. The Brazilian government paid for ship's passage for entire immigrant families to work on coffee plantations during a period of about five years, after which they were free to work elsewhere. However, despite competition from the Brazilian government, between 1880 and 1930, Argentina had few rivals in attracting immigrants and became the main destination country for European emigrants heading to Latin America. Besides Brazil, Cuba was the only country with a predominantly tropical climate to attract many European immigrants during that period. Between 1882 and 1930, more than a million Spaniards immigrated to Cuba, many of them to work in the country's sugar factories.

This mass European immigration was beneficial to the receiving societies as it contributed to their economic development. Most of the immigrants arriving were young people of working age. 76% of the immigrants who entered the United States between 1868 and 1910 were concentrated in the age group between 15 and 40 years old, while this same group made up only 42% of the total population of the United States. According to the 1914 Argentine census, 86% of the foreign population in Argentina was concentrated in the 15–64 age group, while for the native population this same age group represented 45%. Thus, immigrants contributed a high share of the working age population of the countries that received them. The entry of these young immigrants into the labor market, even when their professional qualifications were low, implied an import of human capital that brought net benefits, at the same time that the receiving society saved on costs, such as nurturing and education, due to their age group.

Not all immigrants remained permanently in the Americas. Between 1860 and 1930, 20% of Scandinavian emigrants returned to their country of origin; almost 40% of the English and Welsh who emigrated between 1861 and 1913 returned, and in the first decades of the 20th century between 40 and 50% of Italian immigrants returned to Italy. In many cases, these immigrants made several migratory trips throughout their lives.

Main destinations of European immigrants (19th–20th centuries)
Destination	Period	Number
United States	1821–1932	32,244,000
Argentina	1856–1932	6,405,000
Canada	1831–1932	5,206,000
Brazil	1818–1932	4,431,000
Australia	1821–1932	2,913,000
Cuba	1901–1931	857,000
South Africa	1881–1932	852,000
Chile	1882–1932	726,000
Uruguay	1836–1932	713,000
New Zealand	1821–1932	594,000
Mexico	1911–1931	226,000

== Consequences ==
European immigration to the Americas changed the continent's historical course. The Native American population was heavily affected. Being isolated in the Americas for millennia, Amerindians lacked biological immunity to Old World diseases, resulting in a demographic catastrophe unparalleled in history (with the possible exception of the medieval Black Death and the Spanish flu of 1918).

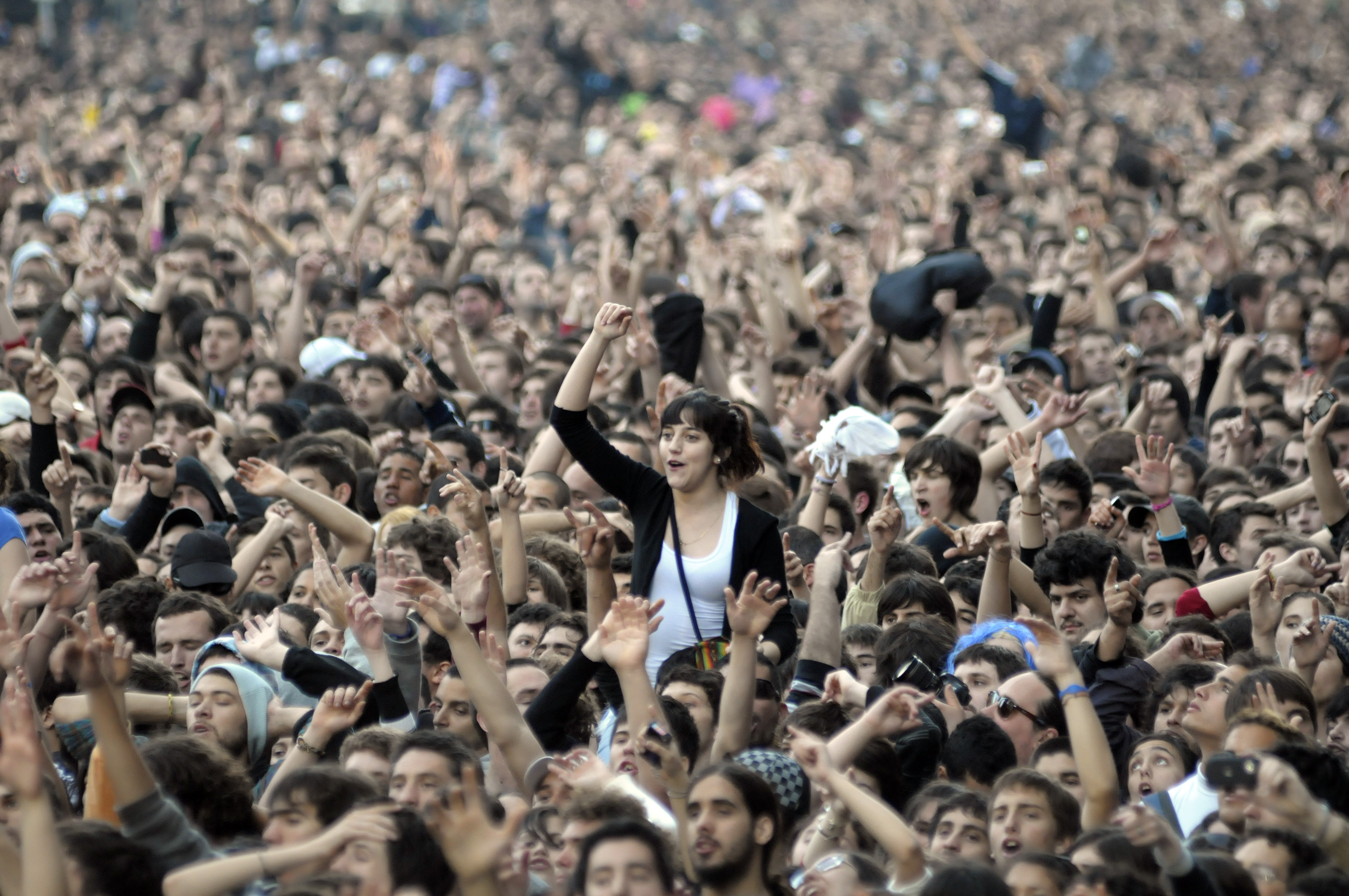
Uruguayans celebrating the country's bicentennial. According to a genetic study, Uruguay is one of the countries in the Americas where the people have the highest proportion of European ancestry.

The arrival of Europeans in the Americas is considered a turning point in human history, marking the beginning of globalization and characterized by demographic, commercial, economic, social and political changes.

Europeans brought to the Americas dozens of new plants and animals, as well as technologies that did not exist in the region and transformed fundamental aspects of everyday life on the continent, from eating and clothing habits to naming patterns, domestic architecture, work and leisure, land use, specifically the introduction of extensive agriculture, livestock and equestrian cultures. They brought with them urban planning, their rules of Law which affected everything from marriage and private relations to inheritance and commercial contracts. Christianity and, specifically in Latin America, Roman Catholicism, served as a unifying and enduring element throughout the region, both in terms of beliefs and practices and as a public institution. In addition, they brought their languages, in particular English, Spanish, Portuguese and French, languages spoken by the overwhelming majority of the inhabitants of the Americas.

Europeans also left deep genetic marks on the inhabitants of the Americas and most of today's Americans trace their ancestry wholly or partially to Europe. The European percentage of gene background is around 84% in Uruguay; 79% in Argentina; 72% in Cuba; 71% in Brazil; 63% in Costa Rica, Puerto Rico, Venezuela and Colombia; 57% in Chile; 41% in Ecuador; 34% in Mexico; 26% in Peru; and 12% in Bolivia. Nowhere in the world did Europeans leave more descendants than in the Americas, not even in recent African and Asian colonies, where the European genetic contribution is minimal.

== See also ==
- European colonialism
- European emigration
