= Academia Nacional de Letras =

The Academia Nacional de Letras (English: "National Academy of Letters") is an association of academics and experts on the use of the Spanish language in Uruguay.

It was founded in Montevideo on February 10, 1943. Among the first members were Cardinal Antonio María Barbieri, Víctor Pérez Petit, Emilio Frugoni, Juana de Ibarbourou, Emilio Oribe, Alberto Zum Felde, and Carlos Martínez Vigil.

Since 1960, it is a member of the Association of Spanish Language Academies.

== See also ==
- Diccionario del español del Uruguay
- Category:Members of the Uruguayan Academy of Language
