= Immigration History Research Center =

- Parent institution: University of Minnesota
- Established: 1965
- Location: Minneapolis, Minnesota, United States
- Website: http://www.ihrc.umn.edu/

The Immigration History Research Center (IHRC) is an interdisciplinary research center in the College of Liberal Arts at the University of Minnesota.

Founded in 1965, the IHRC promotes research on migration with a special emphasis on immigration to the U.S. It sponsors seminars, lectures and workshops that bring highly specialized researchers from the academic world into dialogue with each other and with university and high school students and their teachers, with journalists, photographers and filmmakers, and with immigrant and ethnic communities in the United States. The IHRC especially seeks to enrich contemporary debates about international migration—so often heated, emotional, and unrelated to facts—from historical and scholarly perspectives.

The Immigration History Research Center supports efforts to archive immigrant historical records. For example, the center supports Collections Online: A Digital Library of American Immigration & Ethnic History (COLLAGE), a database of images and narratives. Starting in 2013, the center began a comprehensive, publicly-accessible digital archive to preserve and share the stories of immigrants and their families, especially through videos with multilingual translations.

The IHRC is proud to have built one of the largest and most important collections of materials documenting U.S. immigration and refugee life to be found anywhere in North America. Each year, it welcomes not only student and faculty researchers from the university and Minnesota communities, but also scholars from a wide range of disciplines across North America and around the world.
