= Spanish language in South America =

The Spanish language in South America varies within the different countries and regions of the continent. The term "South American Spanish" (Spanish: español sudamericano or español suramericano) is sometimes used as a broad name for the dialects of Spanish spoken on the continent, but such a term is only geographical and has little or no linguistic relevance. Spanish is the most widely spoken language of the South American continent, followed closely by Portuguese.

The diverse Spanish dialects of the continent have no unifying feature to set them apart from non-South American varieties. The Spanish of the Andean highlands is historically conservative, having some traits in common with the Spanish of central Mexico, while varieties spoken in Argentina and Venezuela share some phonological innovations with the Spanish spoken on Caribbean islands. In some cases a single South American country—for example Colombia—presents a broad spectrum of conservative and innovative dialects.

- Amazonic Spanish (Mainly in Eastern Peru, also in nearby Ecuador and Southeast Colombia)
- Andean Spanish (Mainly in highlands of Bolivia, Ecuador and Peru; also in Southwest Colombia, Northern Chile and Northwest Argentina)
- Bolivian Spanish
- Caribbean Spanish (Venezuela and the Caribbean coast of Colombia)
- Chilean Spanish
  - Chilote Spanish
  - Cuyo Spanish (A branch of Chilean Spanish spoken in Western Argentina and influenced by Rioplatense Spanish)
- Varieties of Colombian Spanish
- Ecuadorian Spanish
- Equatorial Spanish (Pacific coast of Colombia, Ecuador and Northern Peru)
- Llanero Spanish (Llanos region of Colombia and Venezuela)
- Paraguayan Spanish (Paraguay, Northeast Argentina and Eastern Bolivia)
- Peruvian Spanish
  - Peruvian Coast Spanish
- Rioplatense Spanish (Coastal Argentina and Uruguay)
  - Cordobés Spanish (Córdoba, Argentina)
  - Uruguayan Spanish
- Venezuelan Spanish
  - Maracucho Spanish

== See also ==
- Media Lengua
- Palenquero
- San Andrés–Providencia Creole
