= Spanish language in the Americas =

The different dialects of the Spanish language spoken in the Americas are distinct from each other, as well as from those varieties spoken in the Iberian Peninsula —collectively known as Peninsular Spanish— and the Spanish of Equatorial Guinea, of the Western Sahara, of the Philippines, and so on. There is great diversity among the various Hispanic American vernaculars, as there are no common traits shared by all of them which are not also in existence in one or more of the variants of Iberian Spanish. A general Hispanic American "standard" does, however, vary from the Castilian standard register used in television, music and, notably, in the dubbing industry. Of the more than 498 million people who speak Spanish as their native language, more than 455 million are in Latin America, the United States and Canada, as of 2022. The total amount of native and non-native speakers of Spanish as of October 2022 well-exceeds 595 million.

There are numerous regional particularities and idiomatic expressions within Spanish. In Latin American Spanish, for instance (such as in Mexico or Puerto Rico, or areas of the contiguous U.S.), loanwords directly from English are used with some frequency, with English or non-Spanish spellings left intact. For example, the Hispanic American Spanish word for "computer" is computadora, whereas the word used in Spain is ordenador, and each word sounds "foreign" in the region where it is not used. Some differences are due to Iberian Spanish having a stronger French and Mediterranean influence than Hispanic America, where, for geopolitical and social reasons, the United States' English-language influence has been predominant throughout the twentieth century. Another common loanword, used often in different Latin American Spanish dialects, is a simple affirmative O.K. or okay, instead of sí or está bien ('yes' or 'it's good/okay').

== Main features ==
=== Phonology ===
Pronunciation varies from country to country and from region to region, just as English pronunciation varies from one place to another. In general terms, the speech of the Americas shows many common features akin to southern Spanish variants, especially to western Andalusia (Seville, Cádiz) and the Canary Islands. Coastal language vernaculars throughout Hispanic America show particularly strong similarities to Atlantic-Andalusian speech patterns while inland regions in Mexico and Andean countries are not similar to any particular dialect in Spain.

- Most Spaniards pronounce ⟨z⟩ and ⟨c⟩ (before /e/ and /i/) as [θ] (called distinción). Conversely, most Hispanic Americans have seseo, lacking a distinction between this phoneme and /s/. However, seseo is also typical of the speech of many Andalusians and all Canary islanders. Andalusia's and the Canary Islands' predominant position in the conquest and subsequent immigration to Hispanic America from Spain is thought to be the reason for the absence of this distinction in most Latin American Spanish dialects.
- Most of Spain, particularly the regions that have a distinctive /θ/ phoneme, realize /s/ with the tip of tongue against the alveolar ridge. Phonetically this is an "apico-alveolar" "grave" sibilant [s̺], with a weak "hushing" sound reminiscent of retroflex fricatives. To a Hispanic American, Andalusian or Canary Island Spanish speaker, the /s/ in Spanish dialects from northern Spain might sound close to [ʃ] like English ⟨sh⟩ as in she. However, this apico-alveolar realization of /s/ is not uncommon in some Latin American Spanish dialects which lack [θ]; some inland Colombian Spanish (particularly Antioquia) and Andean regions of Peru and Bolivia also have an apico-alveolar /s/.
- Most Hispanic American Spanish usually features yeísmo: there is no distinction between ⟨ll⟩ and ⟨y⟩. However, realization varies greatly from region to region. Chileans pronounce these 2 graphemes as [ʝ], for example. However, yeísmo is an expanding and now dominant feature of European Spanish, particularly in urban speech (Madrid, Toledo) and especially in Andalusia and the Canary Islands, though in some rural areas [ʎ] has not completely disappeared. Speakers of Rioplatense Spanish pronounce both ⟨ll⟩ and ⟨y⟩ as [ʒ] or [ʃ]. The traditional pronunciation of the digraph ⟨ll⟩ as [ʎ] is preserved in some dialects along the Andes range, especially in inland Peru, the Sierra of Ecuador, and the Colombia highlands (Santander, Boyacá, Nariño), northern Argentina, all Bolivia and Paraguay; the Indigenous languages of these regions (Quechua, Guarani and Aymara) have [ʎ] as a distinct phoneme.
- Most speakers of coastal dialects may debuccalize or aspirate syllable-final /s/ to [h], or drop it entirely, so that está /esˈta/ ("s/he is") sounds like [ehˈta] or [eˈta], as in southern Spain (Andalusia, Extremadura, Murcia, Castile–La Mancha (except the northeast), Madrid, the Canary Islands, Ceuta and Melilla).
- ⟨g⟩ (before /e/ or /i/) and ⟨j⟩ are usually aspirated to [h] in Caribbean and other coastal language vernaculars, as well as in all of Colombia and southern Mexico, as in much of southern Spain. In other Latin American dialects, the sound is closer to [x], and often firmly strong (rough) in Peruvian Spanish dialect. Very often, especially in Argentina and Chile, [x] becomes fronter [ç] when preceding high vowels /e, i/ (these speakers approach [x] to the realization of German ⟨ch⟩ in ich); in other phonological environments it is pronounced either [x] or [h].
- In many Caribbean varieties, the phonemes /l/ and /r/ at the end of a syllable sound alike or can be exchanged: caldo > ca[r]do, cardo > ca[l]do; some people assimilate the phonemes /l/, /r/ or /s/ to a following consonant, so the words alta, harta and hasta may be pronounced ['atta]; in the situation of /r/ in word-final position, it becomes silent, giving Caribbean dialects of Spanish a partial non-rhoticity. This happens at a reduced level in Ecuador and Chile as well. It is a feature brought from Extremadura and westernmost Andalusia.
- In many Andean regions, the alveolar trill of rata and carro is realized as an retroflex fricative [ʐ] or [ɹ] or even as a voiced apico-alveolar [z]. The alveolar approximant realization is particularly associated with an Indigenous substrate and it is quite common in Andean regions, especially in inland Ecuador, Peru, most of Bolivia and in parts of northern Argentina and Paraguay. That phonetic is also heard in Costa Rica, except pronounced as [z].
- In Belize, Puerto Rico, and Colombian islands of San Andrés, Providencia and Santa Catalina, aside from [ɾ], [r], and [l], syllable-final /r/ can be realized as [ɹ], an influence of American English to Puerto Rican dialect and British English to Belizean dialect and Colombian dialect of Archipelago of San Andrés, Providencia and Santa Catalina (in the case of the latter three, it is not exclusive to Colombians whose ancestors traced back to Spanish period before British invasion, under British territorial rule, and recovery of Spanish control, but is also used by Raizals, whites of British descent, and descendants of mainland Colombians); verso (verse) becomes [ˈbeɹso], aside from [ˈbeɾso], [ˈberso], or [ˈbelso], invierno (winter) becomes [imˈbjeɹno], aside from [imˈbjeɾno], [imˈbjerno], or [imˈbjelno], and escarlata (scarlet) becomes [ehkaɹˈlata], aside from [ehkaɾˈlata], [ehkarˈlata], or [ehkaˈlata]. In word-final position, /r/ will usually be one of the following:
  - a trill, a tap, an approximant, [l], or elided when followed by a consonant or a pause, as in amo [r ~ ɾ ~ ɹ ~ l ~ ∅] paterno ('paternal love');
  - a tap, an approximant, or [l] when followed by a vowel-initial word, as in amo[ɾ ~ ɹ ~ l] eterno ('eternal love').
- In Chile and Costa Rica, consonant cluster [tɾ] can be pronounced [tɹ̝̥], [tɻ], or [tʂ], making cuatro 'four' and trabajo 'work' pronounced as [ˈkwatɹ̝̥o ~ˈkwatɻo ~ ˈkwatʂo] and [tɹ̝̥aˈβaxo ~ tɻaˈβaxo ~ tʂaˈβaxo] respectively. This is an influence of Mapudungun in Chile and native languages of Costa Rica.
- The voiced consonants /b/, /d/, and /ɡ/ are pronounced as plosives after and sometimes before any consonant in most of Colombian Spanish dialects (rather than the fricative or approximant that is characteristic of most other dialects): pardo [ˈpaɾdo], barba [ˈbaɾba], algo [ˈalɡo], peligro [peˈliɡɾo], desde [ˈdezde/ˈdehde]—rather than the [ˈpaɾðo], [ˈbaɾβa], [ˈalɣo], [peˈliɣɾo], [ˈdezðe/ˈdehðe] of Spain and the rest of Spanish America. The Department of Nariño and most Costeño speech (Atlantic coastal dialects), however, realize them as soft fricatives.
- Word-final /n/ is velar [ŋ] in much Latin American Spanish speech; this means a word like pan (bread) is often articulated ['paŋ]. To an English-speaker, those speakers that have a velar nasal for word-final /ŋ/ make pan sound like pang. Velarization of word-final /n/ is so widespread in the Americas that it is easier to mention those regions that maintain an alveolar [n]: most of Mexico, Colombia (except for coastal dialects) and Argentina (except for some northern regions). Elsewhere, velarization is common, although alveolar word-final [n] can appear among some educated speakers, especially in the media or in singing. Velar word-final [ŋ] is also frequent in Spain, especially in southern Spanish dialects (Andalusia and the Canary Islands) and in the Northwest: Galicia, Asturias and León.

=== Grammar ===
- Hispanic America virtually lacks leísmo, the use of indirect object pronouns in place of direct object pronouns. Leísmo is found in many Peninsular varieties, but also in Paraguay and the highlands of Ecuador.
- The second-person familiar plural pronoun vosotros is not generally used in daily speech in Hispanic American varieties; the formal ustedes is used at all levels of familiarity. However, vosotros and its conjugations are known and seen occasionally in writing or oratory, especially in formal, ritualized contexts.
- Voseo, the use of vos as a second-person singular, is common in southern parts of South America and much of Central America and southern Mexico.

=== Vocabulary ===
- Anglicisms are far more common in Hispanic America than in Spain, due to the stronger and more direct US influence. Anglicisms in Chile and Argentina are very common mostly because of the influence of British settlers.
- Indigenous languages influenced Latin American Spanish, especially in the vocabulary around flora, fauna and cultural habits. European Spanish has also absorbed numerous words of Amerindian origin, although for historical reasons, the vast majority of these are taken from Nahuatl and various Caribbean languages.
- Arabic-derived words with Latinate doublets are common in Latin American Spanish, being influenced by Andalusian Spanish, such as alcoba ("bedroom") instead of standard cuarto, recámara, and many others and alhaja ("jewel") instead of standard joya. In this sense Latin American Spanish is closer to the dialects spoken in the south of Spain.
- See List of words having different meanings in Spain and Hispanic America.

== Varieties ==
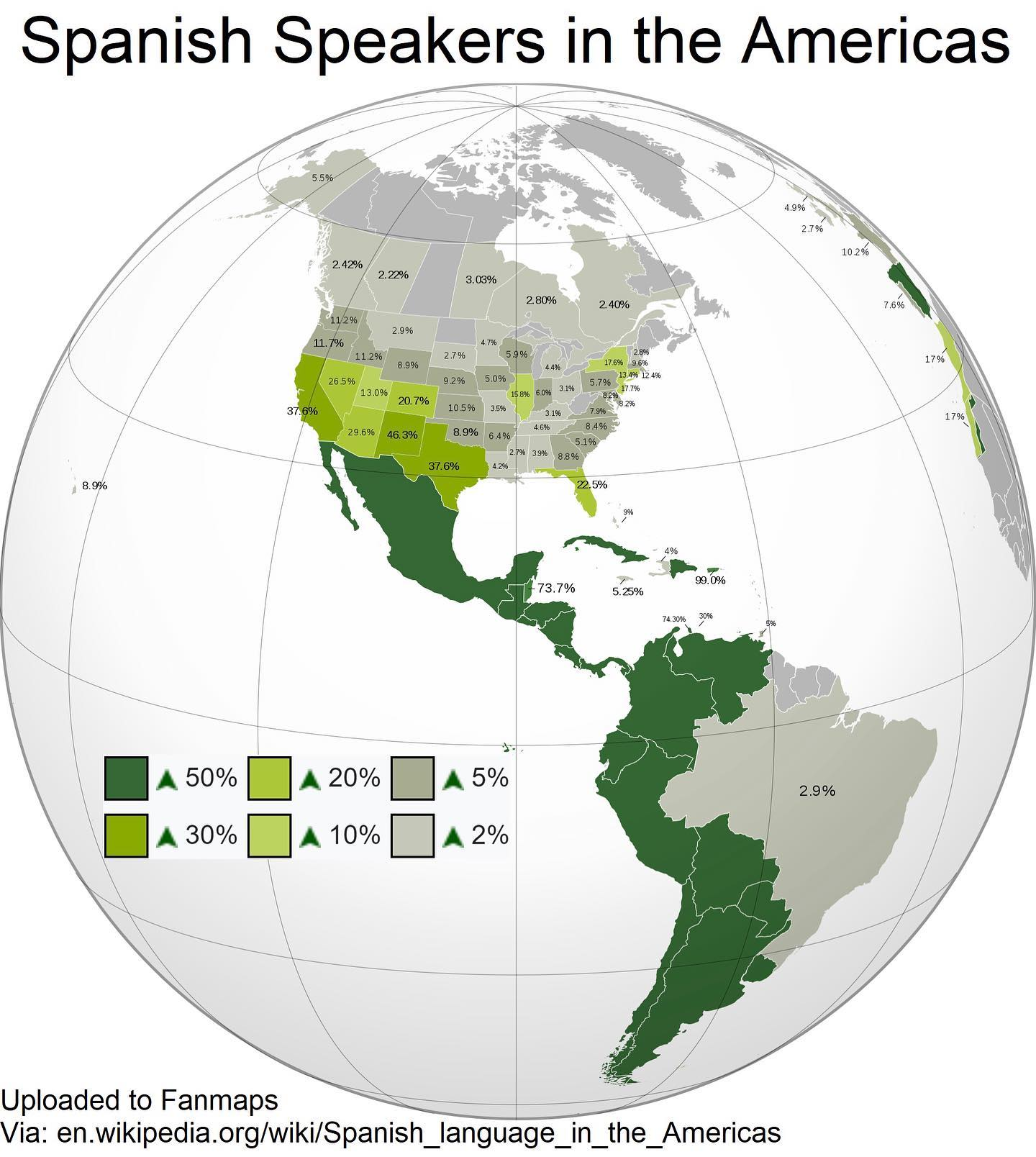

=== North America ===
- Mexican Spanish
- Spanish language in the United States
  - Isleño Spanish
  - Sabine River Spanish
  - New Mexican Spanish
  - Chicano Spanish

==== Central America ====
- Belizean Spanish
- Costa Rican Spanish
- Guatemalan Spanish
- Honduran Spanish
- Nicaraguan Spanish
- Salvadoran Spanish

=== The Caribbean ===
- Cuban Spanish
- Dominican Spanish
- Panamanian Spanish
- Puerto Rican Spanish
- Trinidadian Spanish

=== South America ===
- Amazonic Spanish
- Andean Spanish
- Bolivian Spanish
- Chilean Spanish
  - Chilote Spanish
- Colombian Spanish
- Ecuadorian Spanish
- Paraguayan Spanish
- Peruvian Spanish
  - Peruvian Coast Spanish
- Rioplatense Spanish
  - Argentine Spanish
    - Porteño Spanish
    - Cuyo Spanish
    - Cordobés Spanish
  - Uruguayan Spanish
    - Fronterizo Spanish
- Venezuelan Spanish
  - Maracucho Spanish

== See also ==
- Philippine Spanish
- Equatoguinean Spanish
- Spanish Filipino
- Latin Union
- Spanish-language literature
- Hispanic
