= Ecuadorian Spanish =

Variety of Spanish language

- Español ecuatoriano
- Pronunciation: [espaˈɲol ekwatoɾiˈjano]
- Native to: Ecuador
- Region: Ecuador
- Ethnicity: Ecuadorians
- Native speakers: 13.5 million (2014)
- Language family: Indo-European: Italic; Latino-Faliscan; Romance; Western; Ibero-Romance; West Iberian; Castilian; Spanish; Ecuadorian Spanish
- Early forms: Old Latin: Classical Latin; Vulgar Latin; Old Spanish; Early Modern Spanish
- Writing system: Latin (Spanish alphabet)

Official status
- Official language in: Ecuador
- Regulated by: Academia Ecuatoriana de la Lengua

Language codes
- ISO 639-1: es
- ISO 639-2: spa
- ISO 639-3: –
- Glottolog: None
- IETF: es-EC

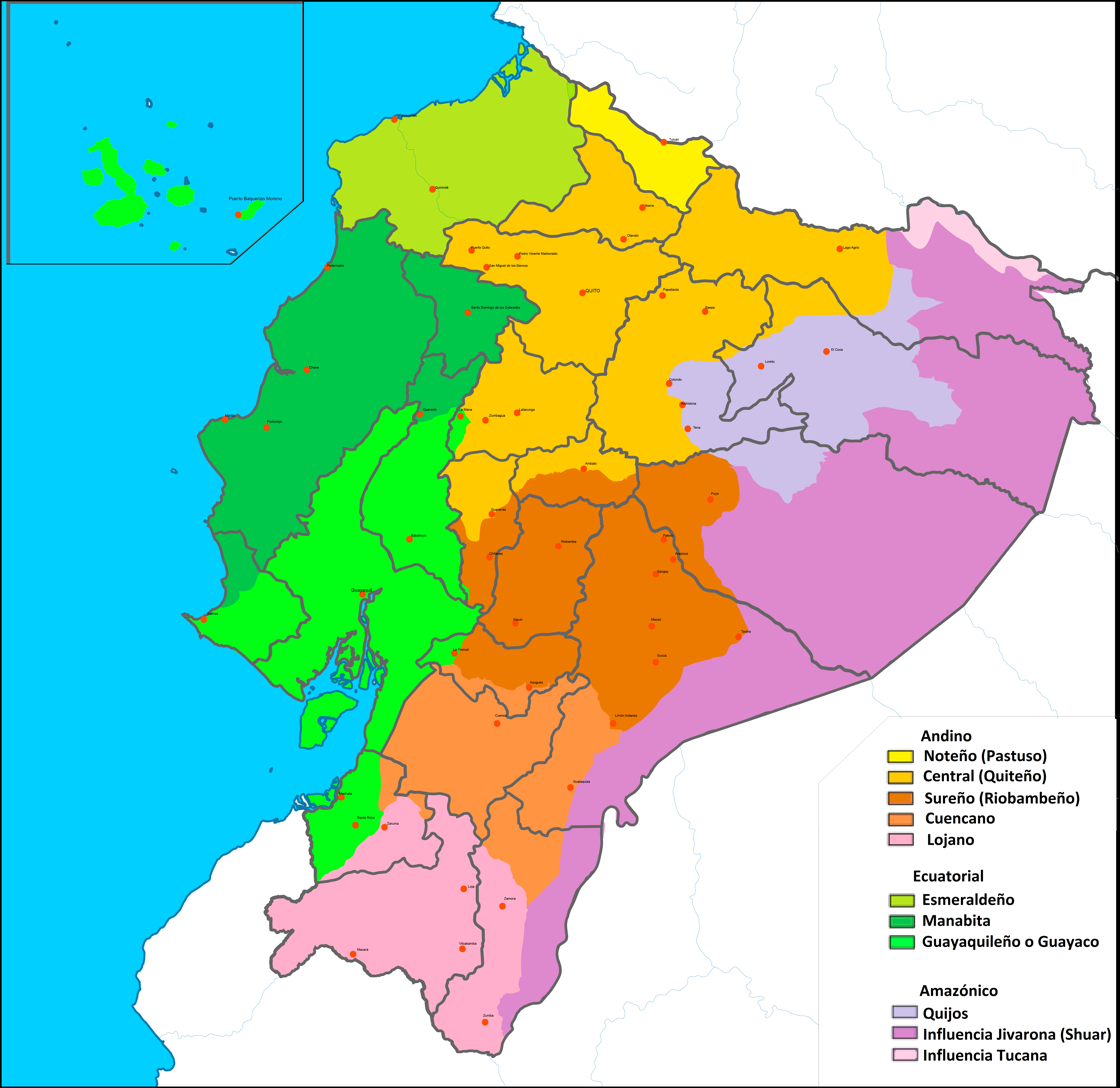
Map of the main dialects spoken in Ecuador.

Spanish is the official (mentioned in its constitution as castellano) and most-widely spoken language in Ecuador, though great variations are present depending on several factors, the most important one being the geographical region where it is spoken. The three main regional variants are:

- Equatorial Pacific Spanish or Equatorial Coastal Spanish
- Andean Spanish
- Amazonic Spanish

Additionally to the characteristics described below, Ecuadorian Spanish shares many characteristics that are widespread in Spanish in the Americas.

Other sociolinguistic factors that influence in the way of speaking are the ethnic or social class of the speaker, and whether the speaker lives in an urban or rural area. Since the Coast and the Highlands are the most populous areas, these are the country's most widely used dialects, despite being quite different from each other. For instance, there are many idioms specific to each region or province, and others that are used and understood nationwide.

== Pacific Coast ==
Costeño: This Spanish variant is classified within the Equatorial Spanish dialect, which extends from the south Pacific coastal Colombia to the northern coast of Peru, crossing the Ecuadorian seacoast. The influential linguistic center of this dialectal region is the port city of Guayaquil.

The most remarkable feature of this variant, is the aspiration of the letter "s" at the end of words or when preceded by another consonant, often being pronounced as a smooth English "h". Likewise, letter "j" is not pronounced as strongly as in other variants [x] but rather smoothly and aspirated [h]. These features are shared with many coastal Latin American Spanish dialects along with Canary Islands.

Thus, this dialect set the phonemical axis of accentual-tonal transition throughout the American varieties of Spanish, which extends geographically from the northern semi-low intonation of Central American and the Caribbean dialects (since only the European variants of Spanish are particularly low-pitched) to the sharp high intonation characteristic of the lands located south, typical of Peru, Chile, and Argentina.

Therefore, the variant of Spanish spoken in the Ecuadorian coast and its neighboring western Andean plains, shares many features of both Caribbean dialects of northern Colombia and Venezuela, as well as some southern features of the Peruvian seaboard, making identification of this dialect very difficult to the ears of an outsider.

In addition, this variant has incorporated into its lexicon a number of foreign words as well as words shared with other dialects of Ecuador which are understood only within the country. These words come mostly from the Andean Spanish dialects of Ecuador, with strong influences from Quichua (Northern Quechua), although Quechua had no historical presence in the Ecuadorian coast. This is the case of the Quechua-origin word "ñaño" (brother) which is widespread throughout the country.

- Guayaquil accent: One of the most outstanding accents of the region is the one from the city of Guayaquil, the largest city in the country. Being an important large, port city that has grown demographically through immigration, both national and international, many dialectal variations may be found, mainly associated with social class, ethnicity, race and schooling. In general, the "s" sound is dropped or aspirated when it is at the end of the syllables while women tend to overpronounce the letter "s" by saying an unvoiced elongated sound, especially in the beginning of syllables. Among the higher-schooled classes, the tendency is to correct the accent towards a more standard Spanish, as well as to incorporate foreign words —especially from English— into its lexicon. Amongst the lower-schooled people, other variations may be found. There is a group of people who tend to share their intonation with the coastal farmers (known as "montubio" being from the "monte" or bush). Another group of people tend to have a stronger intonation, which is generally known as "street language" featured by pronouncing letter "s" as an English "sh" [ʃ], in addition to a series of words in their lexicon that are not always understood by other speakers in the region. In some populations there is a notable sing-songy rhythm and intonation similar to Venezuelan Spanish and Rioplatense Spanish that reflects the late 20th century settling of Southern Italians in coastal cities like Guayaquil.
- Montubio accent: This the dialect spoken by the inhabitants of the rural areas of the Guayas, Los Rios and Manabi provinces, known as montubio. They tend to emphasize the first syllable of most words and to pronounce both the "s" and the "z" like the sound [θ] (like th in think). This phonological type is called ceceo which is also common in some Andalusian Spanish dialects; while some montubios do not pronounce the "s" at all at the end of the words.
- Esmeraldas accent: The province of Esmeraldas, on the other hand, presents a very different variant noticeable to the rest of the region, with a strong African component, which closely resembles the accent spoken in the bordering coastal region of Colombia (known there as "Chocoano" dialect). Since this region has a majority of people of African origin, this dialect tends to be a little stronger, featuring both lexical and intonation differences.
- Manabí accent: The accent spoken in the province of Manabí is somewhat similar to the dialect spoken in Guayaquil, though slight variations in intonation and lexicon make it distinct and easily identifiable as a separate variety within the Ecuadorian coastal dialect.

Other regions in the Coast tend to speak a very similar dialect to the one spoken in the city of Guayaquil, due to its influence, especially in urban areas. Slight local variations can be found, naturally.

== Andes ==
In the highlands of Ecuador, a Serrano variant of Spanish is spoken, often confused by foreigners with Chilango Spanish —the dialect spoken in Mexico City— due to its similarities. However, it can be subdivided into four dialects:

- Pastuso Spanish (spoken in Carchi Province, at the border with Colombia and essentially identical to the one spoken at the other side of the border, in the Colombian department of Nariño)
- Chota Valley dialect, spoken only amongst the people of African descent that live in this valley between the provinces of Imbabura and Carchi. It is a mix of the Highland Central dialect with African influences, and different from the accent spoken in the coastal province of Esmeraldas. The Chota dialect is phonetically a highlands variety, with only slightly higher rates of s-reduction than surrounding varieties. Final /s/ is often lost in the Chota variety when it's not morphologically significant, as in the first person plural ending -mos. This treatment of /s/ is consistent with creolized or African-influenced varieties of Spanish and Portuguese. The current Chota dialect has absorbed some popular Andean syntactic formations, including those typical of Spanish-Quechua bilinguals. The Chota dialect, especially among its older and least-educated speakers, manifests an occasional lack of grammatical agreement, changes to prepositional usage, and constructions typical of creolized Spanish. Normally redundant subject pronouns which would be dropped in other varieties are often retained in the Chota, as in Esmeraldas and several other areas such as the Caribbean. The current dialect in Chota offers a window into an earlier stage, when a dialect with more features of Bozal Spanish was widely spoken. Examples are archaic conjugations like veer→vide, traer→truje, dir for ir (yo guadí = yo voy a ir), and Galician-Portuguese lexemes like cachimba for a tobacco pipe.
- Central Andean, the dialect spoken in Quito and most of the Highlands.
- Morlaco Spanish, the dialect spoken in the city of Cuenca and the surrounding areas (provinces of Azuay and Cañar). Its main feature is the "singing" accent they have, many syllables being stressed where they don't correspond. As in the native languages of the region, the phoneme /r/ tends to be realized as a fricative trill [r̝], akin to the letter ⟨ř⟩ in Czech. Plus, this zone has a lot of own idiomatic expressions not used elsewhere in the country.
- Southern Highlander, the one spoken in the province of Loja. This variant is maybe the most neutral from the Highlands region, but with a special feature, known in Spanish as lleísmo (the ancient Castilian way of pronouncing ⟨ll⟩ [ʎ] as opposed to the yeísmo that is widespread in the rest of the Spanish speaking world where the sounds for ll and y are pronounced as y [ʝ]). For instance, the word "pollo" (chicken) would be pronounced akin to "polio".

The Spanish spoken in the Ecuadorian Andes tends to have many idioms borrowed from Kichwa, the native language spoken by the indigenous from this region. Words such as ñaño (which is used by many to refer to brother or "bro", while ñaña would mean sister) or choclo (corn on the cob) are widely used by people of any ethnicity or social class in this area.
Chulla /čuža/ is a native of Quito and wambra is a young person of courting age, male or female. Campesinos and mestizos often use a special calque of the Kichwa polite request: Déme mirando = Mire, por favor; Dame pasando por la casa = Quisiera que fueras por la casa. Phonetically the clearest distinction from any Mexican or other articulated Spanish (no ~s reduction) is the distinguishing of Y vs. LL. As in the local Quichua (except in Loja), Y is always a semivowel close to i, but LL is a voiced, interdentalic fricative: /ž/ or /ǯ/, similar to Platense Spanish. Voseo (the substitution of the second-person pronoun tú for vos) is also very common in this region of the country, used only for informal conversations between close friends or relatives.
It often uses regular tú-forms of the verb but also is heard with vos-forms (hablás - hablá, comés - comé etc.) Word-final /s/ is often voiced to [z] before a vowel, in addition to voicing before voiced consonants (found also in other dialects).

== Amazonian ==
The Amazonian region has a variant similar to the Central Andean dialect, though there are little differences. For instance, the quijo population from the northern areas, use the 2nd pronoun tú but conjugate the following verb with the 3rd person, usted.

== Galapagos Islands ==
At the islands, a dialect very similar to the one from Guayaquil is spoken, with no major variations, since it is a very low-populated region if compared to the rest of the country.

- Annex: Spanish Language
- Annex: South American Spanish

== Bibliography ==
- Lipski, John M. (1987). "The Chota Valley: Afro-Hispanic Language in Highland Ecuador" (PDF). Latin American Research Review. 22 (1): 155–170. doi:10.1017/S0023879100016460. ISSN 0023-8791. JSTOR 2503546. S2CID 252942699.
