= Colombian Spanish =

Variety of Spanish language

- Español colombiano
- Pronunciation: [espaˌɲol kolomˈbjano]
- Native to: Colombia
- Native speakers: 46,393,500 in Colombia, all users (2014); L1 users: 46,300,000 (2015); L2 users: 93,500 (2015)
- Language family: Indo-European: Italic; Latino-Faliscan; Romance; Western; Ibero-Romance; West Iberian; Castilian; Spanish; Colombian Spanish
- Early forms: Old Latin: Classical Latin; Vulgar Latin; Old Spanish; Early Modern Spanish
- Dialects: Bogotan (Rolo); Paisa; Costeño; Cundiboyacense; Valluno; Santanderean; Pastuso; Opita dialect; Llanero; Chocoano; Isleño
- Writing system: Latin (Spanish alphabet)

Official status
- Regulated by: Academia Colombiana de la Lengua

Language codes
- ISO 639-1: es
- ISO 639-2: spa
- ISO 639-3: –
- Glottolog: None
- IETF: es-CO
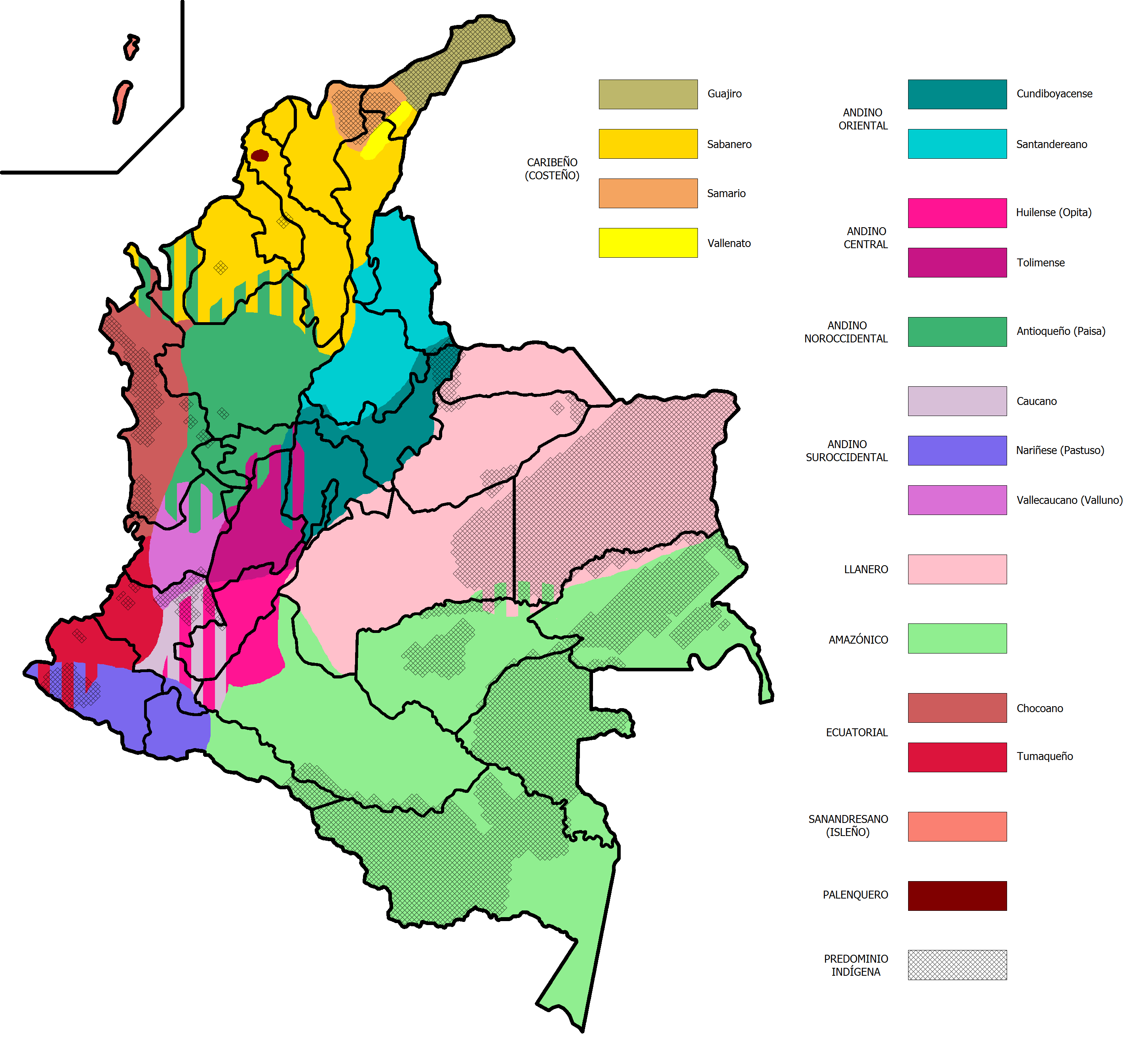
- Spanish dialects in Colombia.

Colombian Spanish (Spanish: español colombiano) is a grouping of the varieties of Spanish spoken in Colombia. The term is of more geographical than linguistic relevance, since the dialects spoken in the various regions of Colombia are quite diverse. The speech of the northern coastal area tends to exhibit phonological innovations typical of Caribbean Spanish, while highland varieties have been historically more conservative. The Caro and Cuervo Institute in Bogotá is the main institution in Colombia to promote the scholarly study of the language and literature of both Colombia and the rest of Spanish America. The educated speech of Bogotá, a generally conservative variety of Spanish, has high popular prestige among Spanish-speakers throughout the Americas.

The Colombian Academy of Language (Academia Colombiana de la Lengua) is the oldest Spanish language academy after Spain's Royal Spanish Academy; it was founded in 1871.

Although it is subject to debate by academics, some critics argue that El desierto prodigioso y prodigio del desierto, written in the New Kingdom of Granada during the 1600s by Pedro de Solís y Valenzuela, is the first modern novel of the Spanish America.

== Phonology ==
- The phoneme /x/ is realized as a glottal [h] "in all regions [of Colombia]" (as in southern Mexico, Guatemala, El Salvador, Honduras, Costa Rica, Nicaragua, Panama, most of Venezuela, Ecuadorian coast, the Spanish-speaking islands of the Caribbean, the Canary Islands, and southern Spain—as well as occasionally in Chile, Peru, and Northwest Argentina). A notable exception is the Pastuso Spanish of Nariño Department, where the phoneme is realized as velar [x].
- As in most other American dialects, most of Colombian Spanish has yeísmo (the merger of /ʎ/ into /ʝ/). The exception is the traditional speech of Santander and around Pasto (inland Nariño), where [ʎ] can still be heard. Until the 20th century, most Andean Colombian dialects maintained /ʎ/, including Bogotá (now, only some older speakers retain the traditional distinction). In the southern parts of Antioquia and Norte de Santander Departments, ⟨ll⟩ represents [ʒ] instead, which still contrasts with the [ʝ] represented by ⟨y⟩. This type of distinction also occurs in the Andean regions of Ecuador.
- As in most of the Americas, the Canary Islands and most of Andalusia, Colombia has seseo (the lack of distinction between /θ/ and /s/), making cocer/coser or abrazar/abrasar homophones. Though seseo is general in Colombia and /s/ is usually lamino-alveolar [s̻], an apico-alveolar, Northern-Spain-style /s/, [s̺], made with the tip of the tongue against the alveolar ridge, is current in many Andean regions, especially in Antioquia Department (Medellín). That trait (unique in the Americas) is to be associated with a large number of northern Spanish settlers in Andean Colombia.
- The voiced consonants /b/, /d/, and /ɡ/ are pronounced as stop consonants after and sometimes before any consonant, rather than the fricative or approximant that is characteristic of most other dialects: pardo [ˈpaɾdo], barba [ˈbaɾba], algo [ˈalɡo], peligro [peˈliɡɾo], desde [ˈdezde] (dialectally [ˈdehde] or [ˈdedːe], rather than the [ˈpaɾðo], [ˈbaɾβa], [ˈalɣo], [peˈliɣɾo], [ˈdezðe] (dial. [ˈdehðe] etc.) of most other dialects. A notable exception is Nariño Department and most Costeño speech (Atlantic coastal dialects), which feature the soft, fricative realizations that are common in other dialects.
- In contrast, intervocalic /b/, /d/, and /ɡ/ are consistently realized as approximants [β̞, ð̞, ɣ˕] and may be elided. For example, Bogotá may be pronounced without the /ɡ/, as [bo.oˈta].
- In some parts of Cundinamarca and Boyacá, the voiceless stops /p/, /t/, and /k/ can be aspirated.
- Some speakers from Boyacá may debuccalize /f/ and /s/ or pronounce them as aspirated fricatives.

=== Vowels ===
As most other Spanish dialects, standard Colombian Spanish has five vowels: two high vowels (/i, u/), two mid vowels (/e, o/) and one open vowel (/a/). Colombian Spanish, like most other Spanish varieties, tends to resolve vowels in hiatus as diphthongs. There is regional differentiation as, in formal speech, Caribbean speakers are more likely to diphthongize than those from inland areas. However, there is no difference in informal speech. Colombian Spanish also has been documented for having vowel reduction, especially in Bogotá. Although this is primarily a tendency than a phonological rule.

== Personal pronouns ==
- Much of the population in Colombia, especially in Bogotá, is known for using usted (the second-person singular pronoun considered formal in most varieties of Spanish) between friends, family members, and others whose relationship would indicate the use of tú or vos in most other dialects.
- Characteristic regional usages of pronouns include voseo (using vos, the familiar singular "you", rather than the tú of other dialects) in the Paisa Region and the Valle del Cauca Department and using of su merced (literally "your grace") in Cundinamarca and Boyacá Departments. Voseo is nonstandard and is prohibited in schools, and its use is decreasing and occurs in informal conversations. In the Eastern Highlands, such as in Bogotá, voseo was common until the 19th century, when it began to decline.
- The second-person plural pronoun vosotros and its corresponding verb forms (-áis/-éis), which are common in Spain, are, as in the rest of the Americas, considered archaic and so are restricted to ecclesiastical language.
- There are marked differences in the use of subject personal pronouns (overt vs. null subjects) between the highlands and coast. The highland varieties have overall pronominal rates of approximately 22-26%. The coastal varieties have higher pronominal rates. For instance, the overall pronominal rate in Barranquilla is 34.2%.

== Diminutives ==
- In Colombian Spanish, the diminutive forms -ico, -ica, rather than the more conventional -ito, -ita, are often used in words whose stem ends with "t": gato ("cat") → gatico ("kitty"). That is often seen in Cuban, Venezuelan, and Costa Rican Spanish as well.
- The diminutive form can be applied not only to nouns, as above, but also to adjectives, to verbs. In their gerundive form, for example, corriendo ("running") becomes corriendito ("scurrying"). In adverbs, for example, ahora ("now") becomes ahorita ("later"). Even in prepositions, junto a ("next to") becomes juntico a ("right next to").
- Redundant diminutives are used in which the diminutive ending is applied to both the noun and the adjective in the same phrase: el chocolate caliente ("the hot cocoa") becomes el chocolatico calientico ("the nice little cup of hot chocolate").
- The emphatic diminutives are used in which two diminutive endings are applied to the same word to emphasize the sentence. For example, with ahora ("now"), Váyase ahora mismo ("Get out right now") becomes Váyase ahoritica mismo ("Get the heck out right now!"). Also, with bueno ("good"), El carro está bueno ("The car is in good condition") becomes El carro está buenecitico ("The car is in tip-top condition").

== Common expressions ==
- Paradoxically, in intrafamily speech, it is common for husband and wife to address each other as mijo and mija (from mi hijo "my son" and mi hija "my daughter"), and sons and daughters are lovingly called papito ("daddy") and mamita ("mommy").
- A common greeting in Colombia is ¿Quiubo? (sometimes written as qui'iubo or kiubo), a contraction of the older, still-used greeting ¿Qué Hubo?. That phrase, used by younger generations, is usually contracted to ¿Qu'iubo? (sometimes written as ¿Kiubo?). The phrase uses the preterite form of the verb haber, whose present-tense form, hay, means "there is" or "there are." Thus, ¿Qué Hubo translates literally to "what was there?" or "what has there been?" It is used like "what's up?" in English. It originated in the Paisa dialect but has spread throughout Colombia, and it is considered throughout Latin America and the Spanish-speaking world to be a very stereotypical of Colombia.

=== Slang words ===
Slang speech is frequent in popular culture. In the Paisa Region and Medellín, the local slang is named "Parlache." Many slang expressions have spread outside their original areas and are now commonly understood throughout the country.

Many of the words have been popularized by the Colombian media, such as Alonso Salazar's book, No nacimos pa' semilla, Victor Gaviria's movie Rodrigo D: No Future, or Andrés López Forero's monologue La pelota de letras ("The Lettered Ball") as well as many other cultural expressions, including telenovelas, magazines, news coverage, jokes, etc..

Some slang terms, with their literal translations and meanings, include the following:

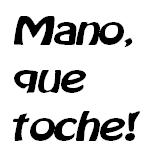

- abrirse ("to split up"): to leave.
- aporrear: to accidentally fall.
- ave María pue: ("well, Hail Mary"): Used to show surprise, especially in the Paisa region.
- bacán, bacano, bacana: Relative to parties god Bacchus, someone or something cool, kind, friendly.
- barra ("[gold] bar"): one thousand Colombian pesos.
- berraco ("boar"): (1) difficult; (2) an exceptionally capable person; (3) to be angry.
- brutal: extremely cool, really awesome (only for things). ¡Esa película fue brutal! – "That movie was so cool!"
- caliente ("hot"): dangerous.
- camello ("camel"): a job. Hard work. ¡Eso fue un camello! – "That was hard work."
- cantaleta: a telling off or nagging.
- catorce ("fourteen"): a favor.
- charlar: to chat, sometimes to gossip or joke.
- charro: funny in an amusing manner. ¡Esa pelicula fue muy charra! – "That movie was very funny."
- chévere: cool, admirable.
- chicanear: to boast, to show off.
- chimba: cool; ¡Que chimba, parce! – "How cool, man!", especially in the Paisa region.
- chino: (from the Chibcha word for child): child.
- cojo ("lame, wobbly"): weak or lacking sense.
- comerse a alguien ("to eat somebody"): to have sex/make out.
- dar papaya ("to give papaya"): to expose yourself to unnecessary risk.
- farra: Party.
- filo ("sharp"): hunger.
- fresco ("fresh"): "Be cool!"
- golfa: a promiscuous woman.
- gonorriento: worst of the worst person (considered low-class).
- guayabo: a hangover (resaca in other parts of Latin America). Ay, estoy enguayabado. Dame un cafecito, porfa. – "Oh, I'm hungover. Give me some coffee please".
- grilla: ("cricket") A prostitute or escort, so called for the way the call out to men on the street (in Antioquia), in Valle del Cauca: a low-class person
- jeta: mouth, in a vulgar term.
- levantar: (1) to pick up a woman or a man (example: Me levanté una vieja anoche — "I picked up a girl last night"); (2) to beat someone up.
- ligar ("to tie"): to give money, to bribe (in Antioquia), in Valle del Cauca: to woo someone
- llave ("key"): friend (considered low-class).
- locha: laziness.
- lucas: (the Roman numeral L that is 50, the highest valued paper money in for a long time in the country) with same usage of the word barra (considered low-class).
- mamar: to suck off. Also, to annoy, irritate. Estoy mamado de esto. "I'm tired of this situation."
- mañe: trashy, lacking class.
- mariconadas: joking around (Deje las mariconadas – "Stop joking around").
- marica ("faggot"): a term of endearment used among friends. Depending on the tone of voice, it can be understood as an insult. Maricón is a harsher, less-friendly variant.
- mierda ("shit"): fecal matter.
- mono(a) ("monkey"): a person with blonde hair or/and light skin or/and light eyes.
- morado(a) ("purple; bruised"): a black person
- mostro: friend (considered low-class).
- onces ("elevenses"): merienda, similar to British Elevenses.
- paquete ("package"): one million Colombian pesos, also used as an insult.
- parar bolas ("to stop balls"): to pay attention.
- parce or parcero: "comrade" (derived from parcelo, slang for owner of a plot of land (parcela)). Originally used as "cell mate" (sharing the same plot of land), its usage devolved into "partner in crime". Used only in criminal circles from the late 1970s, it is now used openly in almost every urban center. It is especially common in the Paisa dialect. Also, it has a drug trafficking-related background: traffickers adapted the Brazilian Portuguese word parceiro ("partner, friend or fellow").
- perder el año ("lose the year"): (1) to flunk (fail to be promoted to the next grade) in school; (2) to die.
- pilas ("batteries"): a word used for warning.
- plata ("silver"): money.
- plomo ("lead"): bullets.
- pola ("from Policarpa Salavarrieta"): a word used as a synonym for beer. In 1910, the Colombian beverage company, Bavaria, launched a special beer to commemorate 100 years of Colombian independence, the beer's name was "La Pola" and after that, the name was used as a colloquial way to say beer.
- porfa (from por favor): please.
- quicas (slang for "fat girls"): breasts (considered low-class).
- ratero (from rata "rat"): robber.
- rumbear ("to rumble"): to make out; to go clubbing (leading to making out).
- sapo ("toad"): informant, snitch, tattletale.
- sardino, sardina ("sardine"): a young person.
- sereno (also chiflón): a mild disease or indisposition; associated with cold breezes (example: Me entró el sereno — "I think I got sick").
- sisas: yes (considered low-class).
- soroche: fainting (example: Me dió soroche — "I passed out"). Soroche also translates to altitude sickness.
- taladro ("drill"): a man who has sex with boys.
- teso: (1) expert, "hardcore" (someone who is very good at doing something); (2) difficult or tricky.
- tinto: a black coffee cup.
- tombo: police officer.
- tragado ("swallowed"): having a crush on someone.
- trillar ("to thresh"): to make out; it is also used to indicate that something has been overused (example: Ya esta trillado eso – "That is overused")
- tirar ("to throw, to shoot"): to have sex.
- vaina ("case"): a loose term for "things", refers to an object or to a complicated situation.
- video: (1) a lie, (2) an overreaction, (3) a problem.
- vieja ("old woman"): woman, female friend, mom.
- viejo or viejito ("old man"): dude, male friend, dad.

== Dialects ==
John M. Lipski groups Colombian dialects phonologically into four major zones. Canfield refers to five major linguistic regions. Flórez proposes seven dialectal zones, based on phonetic and lexical criteria. Still others recognize eleven dialect areas, as listed below.

=== Caribbean dialect ===
The Caribbean or Coastal (costeño) dialect is spoken in the Caribbean Region of Colombia. It shares many of the features typical of general Caribbean Spanish and is phonologically similar to Andalusian Spanish. Word-final /n/ is realized as velar [ŋ]. Syllable-final /s/ is typically pronounced [h] and sk costa ("coast") is pronounced [ˈkohta] and rosales ("roses") becomes [roˈsaleh]. The most notable and distinguishable varieties of Atlantic Colombian accents are Samario (considered the most articulated Atlantic Colombian accent and rhotic), Barranquillero (mostly rhotic), Cartagena (mostly non-rhotic and fast-spoken) and Montería (Sinú Valley Accent, strictly non-rhotic, plosive and very marked wording like Received Pronunciation in British English).

==== Island dialect ====
This is the dialect spoken on the islands of San Andrés, Providencia, and Santa Catalina in Colombia's Caribbean Region. It is marked by a mixture of Caribbean Spanish with some features of English. Syllable-final /r/ can be realized, in addition to the flap [ɾ], the trill [r], and the lateral [l], as the alveolar approximant [ɹ], the last being thought to be an influence of British English. Thus, verso ("verse") becomes [ˈbeɹso] (alongside [ˈbeɾso], [ˈberso], or [ˈbelso]); invierno ("winter") becomes [imˈbjeɹno] (alongside [imˈbjeɾno], [imˈbjerno], or [imˈbjelno]), and escarlata ("scarlet") becomes [ehkaɹˈlata] (alongside [ehkaɾˈlata], [ehkarˈlata], or [ehkaˈlata]).

Word-final /r/, when followed by a vowel-initial word, is usually realized as a tap, an approximant, or the lateral [l], as in amo[ɾ~ ɹ ~ l] eterno ("eternal love"). If it is followed by a consonant or a pause, it may be realized as any of those sounds or as a trill or elided, as in amo[r ~ ɾ ~ ɹ ~ l ~ ∅] paterno ("paternal love").

That phonetic characteristic is not exclusive to Colombians, whose ancestry is traced back to the Spanish period before the British invasion, under British territorial rule, and the recovery of Spanish control. It is also used by Raizals, by whites of British descent, and by descendants of mainland Colombians. The dialect of native Spanish-speakers in the area is closer to the Nicaraguan dialect of the Caribbean coast, reflecting the geographical location of the archipelago, off the coast of Nicaragua. Similar to Chocano and Isleño, there is a strong African influence in this dialect, owing to a large population of Afro-descendants in the region.

=== Chocó or Pacific dialect ===
This dialect extends beyond the Department of Chocó throughout the Pacific coast and is said to reflect African influence in terms of intonation and rhythm. Characteristically, syllable-final /s/ is frequently either debuccalized and pronounced as [h] or omitted, as in the Caribbean dialect (see above). Like the Caribbean dialect, word-final /n/ is realized as velar [ŋ], /d/ is replaced by /r/ in some words, and syllable-final /l/ and /r/ are often merged, as in Caribbean Spanish. This dialect is also spoken by Afro-Colombians living inland in the departments of Cauca and Valle del Cauca.

=== Cundiboyacense dialect ===
The Cundiboyacense dialect is spoken mainly in the departments of Cundinamarca and Boyacá (Cundiboyacense High Plateau). It uses the expression sumercé or su merced (literally "your grace") often as a formal second-person singular pronoun. The pronoun usted is used when two people speak in an informal situation. Tuteo (the use of the pronoun tú) is usual in conversation between a man and woman of similar ages. Occasionally, the pronoun usted may be used briefly in extremely-informal speech between couples or family members or to reprehend someone, depending on the tone of voice. The /s/ is sometimes aspirated in intervocalic contexts but is always retained at the end. Example: Nojotros instead of Nosotros ("we") or Los árboles ("the trees") > loh árboles. There are 3 ways to pronounce it: laminoalveolar, coronodental (common throughout the continent) and apicoalveolar (similar to that of north central Spain).

==== Rolo dialect ====
"Rolo" (a name for the dialect of Bogotá) is also called cachaco. It is an area of strong ustedeo, the familiar use of the pronoun usted. The dialect follows many patterns similar to those of the Cundiboyacense dialect (preservation of syllable-final [s], preservation of /d/ in the -ado ending, preservation of the ll/y contrast (i.e., no yeísmo), etc.), but it has only marginal use of the formal second-person pronoun sumercé. This dialect is the basis of standard Spanish of Colombia.

=== Llanero or Eastern plains dialect ===
Llanero covers a vast area of the country with a low population density. It is spoken in the eastern plains of the country from the Cordillera Oriental (the eastern mountain range of the Andes). It has a characteristic influence of inland Colombian settlers, the difference is that syllable-final /s/ is typically aspirated [h] like Caribbean and Pacific dialects, even /s/ before vowels is aspirated.

=== Opita dialect ===
The Opita dialect is spoken mostly in the departments of Tolima and Huila, mostly in the central and southern parts of the Magdalena River Valley. It is said to show strong influence of indigenous languages and is noted for its slow tempo and unique intonation. As in most of the Americas, the dialect has yeísmo and seseo. The dialect is traditionally characterised by the use of the second-person pronoun usted (or vusted in some rural areas) in formal circumstances but also in familiar ones (in which most other dialects would use tú, see "ustedeo" above). However, tú is gaining ground with young people. The use of voseo is rare.

=== Paisa dialect ===
The Paisa dialect is spoken in the Colombian coffee production areas, such as Antioquia, Quindío, Risaralda, Caldas, and the northernmost parts of Tolima and Valle del Cauca. Paisa Spanish has an apicoalveolar [s̺], between [s] and [ʃ], as in northern and central Spain. Paisa Spanish, a "voseante" dialect, often uses vos, rather than tú, for the familiar singular "you" pronoun. The role of that voseo usage in forming the distinct Paisa linguistic identity was reinforced by its use in the works of several Paisa writers, including Tomás Carrasquilla, Fernando González Ochoa, Manuel Mejía Vallejo, Fernando Vallejo, and Gonzalo Arango.

=== Pastuso dialect ===
The Pastuso dialect is spoken in the southwest ll of the country. One feature is apicoalveolar [s̺], between [s] and [ʃ], as in northern and central Spain. However, unlike Paisa, speakers typically conserve the "ll"/"y" distinction (the dialect has no yeísmo), and in some areas, the r is pronounced as a voiced apical sibilant. Contrary to the usual tendency in Spanish to weaken or relax the sounds /b/, /d/, and /ɡ/ between vowels, Pastuso-speakers tend to tense those sounds with more emphasis than in other dialects.

=== Santanderean dialect ===
Santanderean is spoken mostly in the northeastern part of the country in Santander and Norte de Santander Departments. There is a strong use of ustedeo in both informal and formal contexts.

=== Valluno dialect ===
The Valluno dialect, or español vallecaucano, is spoken in the valley of the Cauca River between the Western and Central cordilleras. In Cali, the capital of Valle del Cauca, there is strong use of voseo (the use of the pronoun vos instead of other dialects, which use tú), with its characteristic verb forms.

The Valluno dialect has many words and phrases not used outside of the region. People commonly greet one another with the phrase "¿Q'hubo vé, bien o qué?". Also, it is common to be asked "¿Sí o no?" when assessing agreement to rhetorical statements. Thong sandals are referred to as chanclas, and plastic bags (bolsas elsewhere) are called chuspas. As in other areas, a chocha is another crude word for "vagina", and chucha refers to an opossum. A pachanguero is someone who dances or parties all night long.

Andrés Caicedo was the main writer to depict the vernacular usage of language accurately.

== Sources ==
- Canfield, D. Lincoln (1981), Spanish Pronunciation in the Americas, Chicago: University of Chicago Press, pp. 34–38, "Colombia", ISBN 978-0-226-09262-1
- Díaz Collazos, Ana María (2015), Desarrollo sociolingüístico del voseo en la región andina de Colombia, Berlín: De Gruyter, doi:10.1515/9783110404142, ISBN 978-3-11-040414-2
- Flórez, Luis (1964), El español hablado en Colombia y su atlas lingüístico: Presente y futuro de la lengua española, vol. 1, Madrid: OFINES, pp. 5–77
- Lipski, John M. (1994), Latin American Spanish, Longman, ISBN 978-0-582-08761-3
- Lipski, John M. (1997). "En busca de las normas fonéticas del español" (PDF). In Colombi, M. Cecilia; Alarconi, Francisco X. (eds.). La enseñanza del español a hispanohablantes : praxis y teoría (in Spanish). Boston: Houghton Mifflin. pp. 121–132. ISBN 9780669398441.
- Low, Peter (2015), Colombian Spanish: Phrases, Expressions and Tips to Help You Speak Like a Local, Travelloco Publishing, ISBN 978-1-5262-0248-2
- Peña Arce, Jaime (2015). "Yeísmo en el español de América. Algunos apuntes sobre su extensión" [Yeísmo in the Spanish spoken in America. Some notes on its extension]. Revista de Filología de la Universidad de la Laguna (in Spanish). 33: 175–199.
- Ringer Uber, Diane (1985), "The Dual Function of usted: Forms of Address in Bogotá, Colombia", Hispania, 68 (2): 388–392, doi:10.2307/342216, JSTOR 342216
