= American Spanish =

American Spanish (Spanish: español americano) may refer to:

- Spanish language in the Americas (Spanish: Español de América)
- Spanish language in the United States (United States Spanish, Spanish: español estadounidense)

== See also ==
- Mexican Spanish
- Spanish American, an American with ancestry from Spain
- Spanish American, related or pertaining to Spanish America
- Hispanic American, related or pertaining to Hispanic America
- Hispanic and Latino Americans, Americans with ancestry from Spain or Latin America
- Spanish language
