= Llanero Spanish =

Dialect of Spanish in parts of Colombia and Venezuela

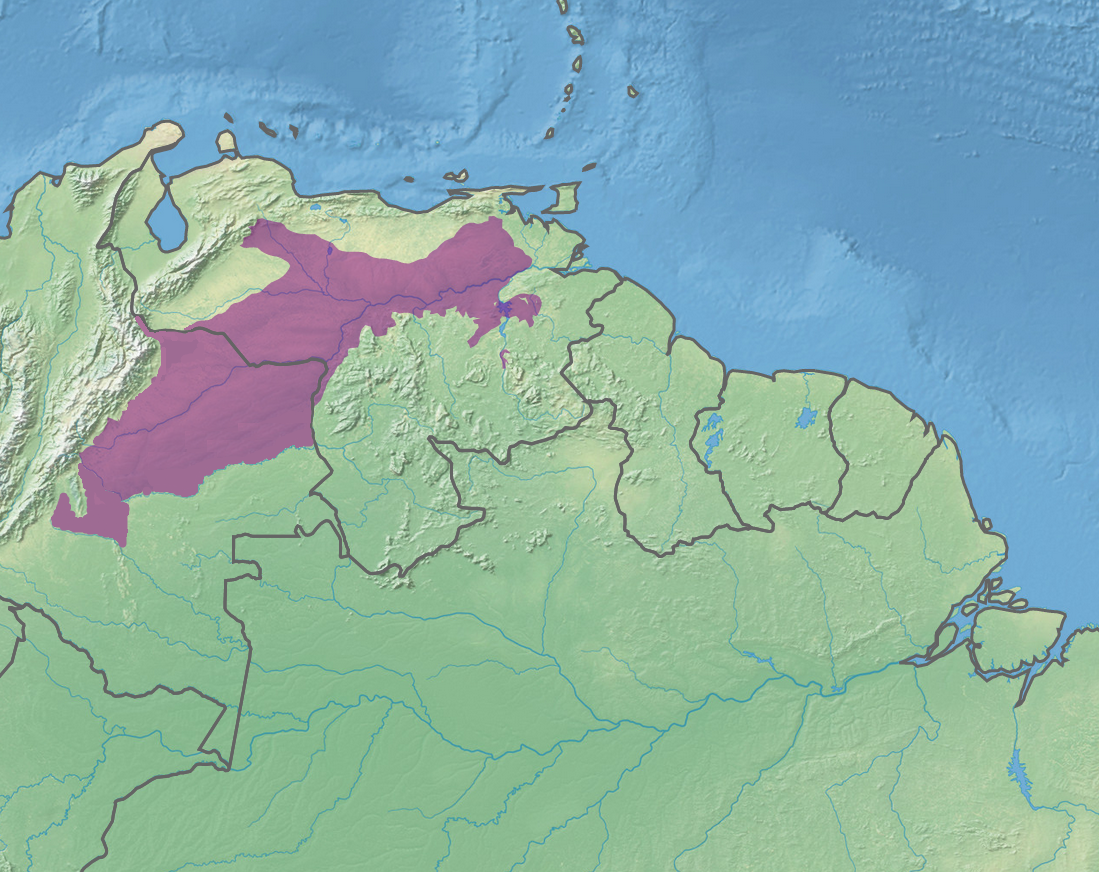
Map showing where the Llanero dialect is spoken in Venezuela and Colombia.

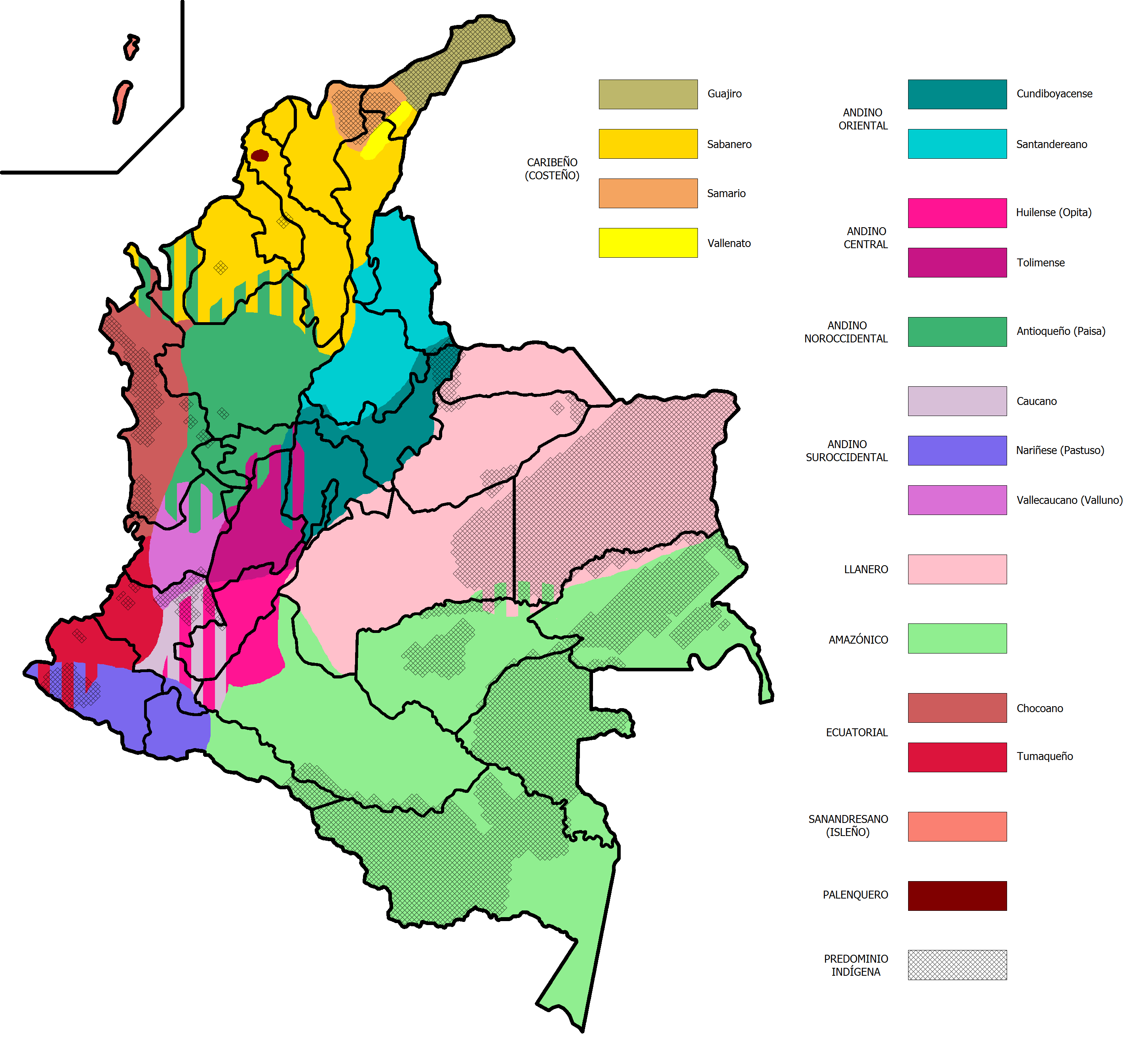
Spanish dialects of Colombia.

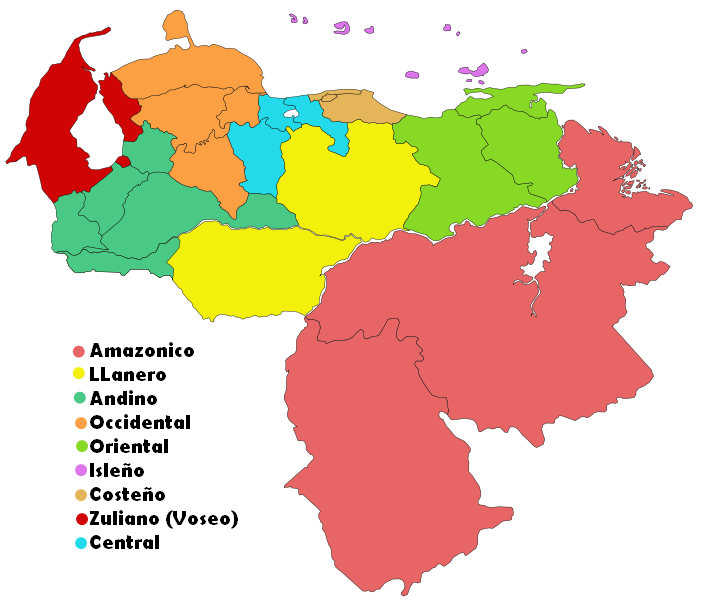
Spanish dialects spoken in Venezuela.

Llanero Spanish (Spanish: español llanero) is a variety of Spanish spoken in the Llanos region of Colombia and Venezuela. It is characterized by the mixing of elements from Old Spanish with indigenous elements.

== Features ==
=== Phonetics ===
Characteristic features of Llanero Spanish include yeísmo, rhoticism (articulation of the /l/ as an /r/, as in vorqueta instead of volqueta, a phenomenon seen in Arauca, Colombia), and final /r/ dropping infinitives (e.g., ventiá, aserrá, ordeñá, cogé).

Llanero Spanish is also characterized by the articulation of the implosive /s/, the aspirated /s/ (e.g., maíh for maíz), and /s/ deletion (e.g., cataplahma for cataplasma) as well. Prevocalic aspiration in place of /s/ can also occur (e.g., (ji jeñol, eso je li olvida = sí señor, eso se le olvida). The phoneme /x/ is even aspirated [h], like most of the rest of Colombia and Venezuela.

Intervocalic stops such as /b/, /d/, and /g/ weaken or disappear in llanero speech (auacero for aguacero).

The dialect preserves the sound of the written "h" (e.g., joyo, jumo, mojo, jallan, sajuma, ajoga, ajita for hoyo, humo, moho, hallan, sahúma, ahoga, ahíta) where other dialects have dropped this consonant. This feature is most commonly seen in Venezuela, Arauca and Casanare.

=== Grammar ===
Llanero Spanish suppresses or weakens the final "-s" of plural nouns (e.g., los antioqueño, loj perro, cuatronarice (cuatronarices is a local snake species), loj padrino.

Llanero Spanish also has a similar nominal composition to costeño dialects, e.g., pativoltiao (pata + volteado ie noun + adjective).

Llanero Spanish allows forming the past anterior with the verb ser, e.g.: "Si no fuera (hubiera) sido por Guadalupe Salcedo…".

=== Lexicon ===
Some lexical forms of costeño origin registered in the region are "cautivar" (cultivate), "concha" (shell or peel), "pollino" (young donkey), and "yerna" (daughter).

The lexicon also includes many Western Colombian contributions, such as "hamero" (wrapper of cob), "choclo" (tender maize), or "rabipelao" (opossum).

== Substrates and contributors ==
=== Indigenous inheritance ===
Perhaps the most distinguishing quality of Llanero Spanish is its Indigenous inheritance. Many indigenous terms are often incorporated into Llanero speech, including:

- The names of regional plants, such as cumare (Astrocaryum aculeatum), moriche (Mauritia flexuosa), mapora (Roystonea oleracea), suy, yaray, bototo, etc.
- The names of indigenous cultural objects adopted by the Creole, such as chiramo (hanging utensil), budare, mapire (basket), chirama (basket) 'catumare (palm vessel), corota (calabash vessel), etc .;
- The indigenous foods adopted into the Creole cuisine, such as majule (plantain porridge), catibía (dough of striped cassava), etc.

Maps and geography texts provide an abundance of toponyms and hydronyms of indigenous origin, such as Guatiquía, Guayuriba, Guarca, Guaicaramo. Perhaps less known is the indigenous contribution to the anthroponymy seen in the many last names of members of the Spanish-speaking communities, such as Catimay, Cuburuco, Chaquea, Humejé, Tabaco, Tupanteve, Tumay, Achagua, Cuyaré, Chamarrabí, Chipiaje, Errenumá, Guacabare, Gaspaday, Guatumé, Itanare, Pirache, Renumá, Tarache, Yaguiduá, Yavimay, Yaya, and Guanay.

=== Internal development ===
Example of how the operation of the language in the peculiar conditions of Los Llanos will produce more or less specific facts is the reorganization of certain lexical microsystems. Throughout the region of Casanare "mirar" (to look [at]) has advanced on the semantic field of "ver" (to see) almost disappeared from ordinary speech to this verb "Entonces miró el presidente Rojas Pinilla que el Llano era una gran belleza", "¿Él no está por aquí? – No, no lo he mirao"; "Yo ya no miro pa’ trabajar esta cosa"; and the same phenomenon is starting to affect the couple "oír – escuchar" in which the latter tends to absorb at first.

Llanero speakers also customarily classify the grocery grown musaceae in three groups: plantains, bananas and topochos; the great importance in the life of the Llanero has placed this last variety in a special class.

The indigenous influence also appears in an indirect and mediated way, not in aboriginal languages, but rather because of characteristics specialties of coexistence of native and indigenous communities, characteristics that come to be very indicative of relationships among these communities, that is, between the silent struggle that continues to develop between them, phenomena characterized by the concepts that the Creole has respect to indigenous: "tunebo" is "ranger", "guajibo"is too shy or reclusive '"(Arauca); and in Puerto López, a saying that could well explain alone the struggles between the Llaneros and the Indians who caused commotion in the Colombian community was heard: "'Neither donkey is beast' 'or Indian is people', or cassava serves for provision".

Certain Spanish words are only commonly seen in Los Llanos or are used there with a peculiar sense are, such as "el cerro" (the hill, the Andes), "cachilapero" (the stealing cattle and disfigures its brands), "cámara', "camarita" (compañero, camarada), "camazo" (calabazo), "caramera" (cornamenta), 'guate' "(rural person), "guafa" (guadua), "magalla" (bag for the hammock), "pompo" (rough, clumsy), "saquero" (cattle buyer), "soropo" "ensoropao" (palm leaf wall) etc., etc.

== See also ==
- Venezuelan Spanish
- Colombian Spanish
