= Equatorial Spanish =

Spanish dialect

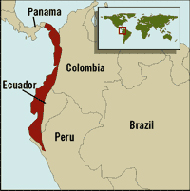
Map of Ecuatorial Spanish

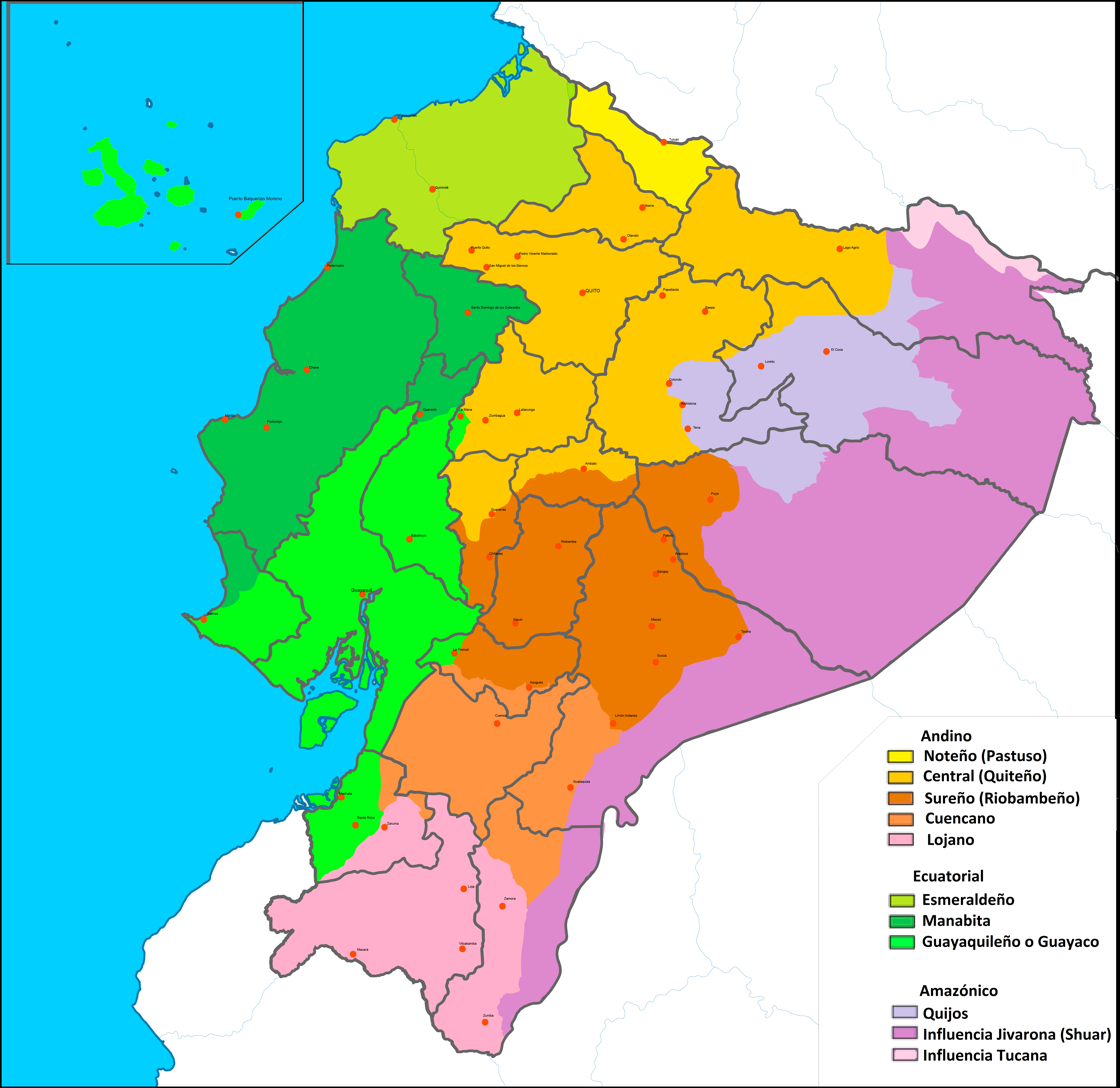
Map of the main dialects of Spanish in Ecuador (the sub-dialects of the Equatorial Spanish are represented in three colors).

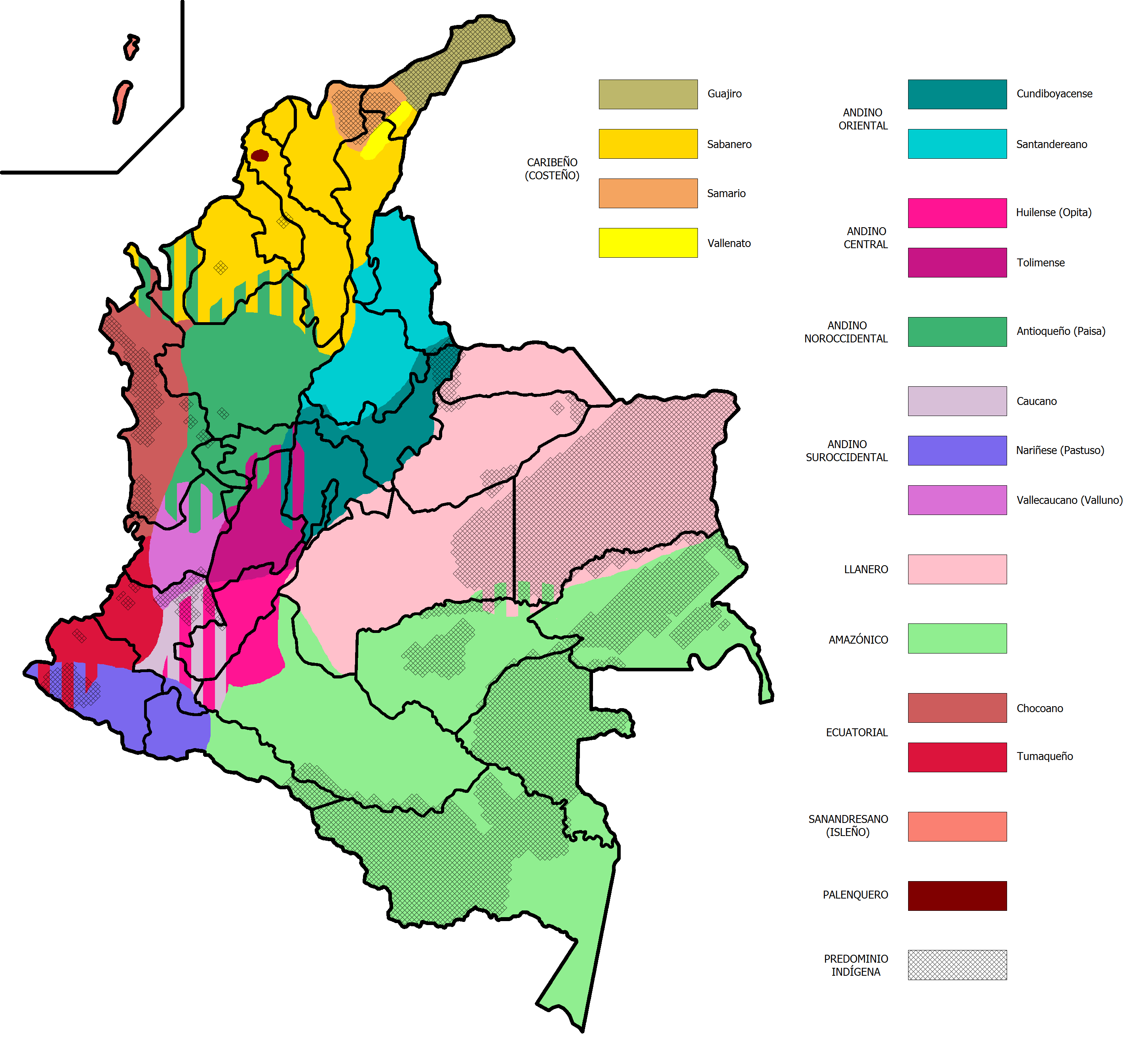
Spanish dialects in Colombia (the sub-dialects of the Equatorial Spanish are represented in two colors).

Equatorial Spanish, also called Coastal Colombian-Ecuadorian dialect or Chocoano, is a dialect of Spanish spoken mainly in the coastal region of Ecuador, as well as in the bordering coastal areas of northern Peru and western Colombia.

It is considered to be transitional between the Caribbean dialects and the Peruvian Coast varieties. Thus, the dialect sets the phonemical axis of accentual-tonal transition throughout the American varieties of Spanish, which extends geographically from the northern semi-low intonation of Central American and the Caribbean dialects (since only the European variants of Spanish are particularly low-pitched) to the sharp high intonation characteristic of the lands located south, typical of Peru, Chile, and Argentina.

Therefore, the variant of Spanish spoken in the Ecuadorian coast and its neighboring western Andean plains, shares many features of both Caribbean dialects of northern Colombia and Venezuela, as well as some southern features of the Peruvian and Chilean seaboard, making identification of this dialect very difficult to the ears of an outsider.

There is an important subvariety of this dialect which is spoken by most of the communities of West African descent dwelling on the border between coastal Colombia (Chocó region), Ecuador (Esmeraldas province), and Peru (Tumbes region), and which is said to reflect African influence in terms of intonation and rhythm.

Another subvariety of the dialect prominent in wealthier regions like samborondon employs words of Italian, Spanish, and Arabic provenance, with argot similar to lunfardo. Intonation of the sub variety reflects the migration of Italians to the region in the late 19th century. This subvariety has also taken foreign affectations from the United States due to American mass media. Often speakers of this subvariety will use English interjections like "Oh my God", "man", "brother", "whatever", etc. in everyday speech. A famous caricature of this variety is played by the Ecuadorian actress Marcela Ruete in her role of "La Cococha."

The major influential linguistic centers are Guayaquil and Buenaventura.

The particular intonation which identifies the speakers of these regions has been a subject of study. Boyd-Bowman (1953) states that the features that he has observed show clearly a phonetic continuity along the coasts of Venezuela, Colombia, Ecuador, and Peru, in contrast to that of their respective Andean provinces. Boyd-Bowman observes that the present borders of Ecuador with the neighboring countries do not correspond to natural geographic boundaries, nor to linguistic/cultural boundaries (the same Spanish is spoken on both sides), nor to older political borders, whether of the Incas or of the Spanish colonies.

== Notable phonological characteristics ==
Equatorial Spanish presents markedly attenuated Caribbean Spanish and Canarian Spanish features:

- Syllable-final /s/ is aspirated or elided (although the middle class tends to avoid or overcorrect).
- As in the Caribbean dialects, the /x/ phoneme is realized as [h].
- Word-final /n/ is realized as velar, and sometimes bilabialized, especially among speakers of African descent.
- In rural areas, there is virtually no difference between /l/ and /ɾ/, but elision is rare.
- In the area of Chocó, intervocalic /d/ is realized as [ɾ]. In this same region the aspirated /s/ and /k/ may result in a glottal stop.
- As in virtually all American dialects, seseo is the norm, meaning that the /θ/ phoneme of European Spanish is absent and /s/ is used instead. There are rural areas on the coast of Ecuador, for instance San Lorenzo in Esmeraldas, where the phonetic realization of /s/ is non-sibilant ([θ]), rather than sibilant [s]. This is called ceceo and is uncommon in the Americas (it is also found in some areas of Andalusia).
- Yeismo (merger of traditional /ʎ/ and /ʝ/, with realization as [ʝ]) is also the general rule here, as it is in most of the American Spanish dialects. There is great variety in the pronunciation of the double LL with some pronouncing it as speakers in Medellín and others pronouncing as a softer Y as pronounced in Caribbean Spanish.
- Some coastal regions have a sing-songy rhythm and intonation similar to Venezuelan Spanish and Rioplatense Spanish that reflects the late 20th century of Southern Italians settling in Guayaquil and the Guayas Province.
