= Maracucho Spanish =

Variety of Spanish generally spoken in the Zulia state in the northwest of Venezuela

- maracaibero; marabino; zuliano
- Region: Zulia, Mauroa municipality
- Language family: Indo-European: Italic; Latino-Faliscan; Latin; Romance; Italo-Western; Western Romance; Ibero-Romance; West Iberian; Castilian; Spanish; Venezuelan Spanish; Maracucho Spanish
- Early forms: Vulgar Latin: Old Spanish; Early Modern Spanish
- Writing system: Latin script (Spanish alphabet)

Language codes
- ISO 639-3: –
- IETF: es-u-sd-vev
- Region where Maracucho Spanish is spoken

Maracucho Spanish (also called maracaibero, marabino or zuliano) is a variety of Spanish generally spoken in Zulia in the northwest of Venezuela and in the west of Falcón (Mauroa Municipality). Unlike other varieties from Caracas, Venezuelan Llanos or the Venezuelan Andean region, Maracucho is typically voseante. It preserves verbal forms identical to the original medieval voseo, without apocope or syncope, which distinguishes it from Chilean and Rioplatense voseo, respectively.

Ending	Peninsular plural	Voseo^{1} singular	Marabino singular	Chilean singular	Standard singular
-ir	vosotros partís	vos partís		tú partís	tú partes
-er	vosotros corréis	vos corrés	vos corréis	tú corrís	tú corres
-ar	vosotros cantáis	vos cantás	vos cantáis	tú cantái	tú cantas
-ir (Alternating)	vosotros decís	vos decís		tú decís	tú dices
-er (Alternating)	vosotros perdéis	vos perdés	vos perdéis	tú perdís	tú pierdes
Ar (alternating)	vosotros colgáis	vos colgás	vos colgáis	tú colgái	tú cuelgas
(imperative)	mirad vosotros	mirá vos		mira tú
^{1} General Voseo from Rioplatense to Central America

Maracucho is characterized by its use of many words and expressions that are different from Venezuelan Spanish and its markedly different accent from those of other regions of the country. In terms of pronunciation, it has much in common with Venezuelan and other Caribbean dialects, more obviously aspiration of [x] and syllable-final /s/. An interesting fact is that the demonyms of Maracaibo are due to the type of speech used by the people of Municipality. The Maracuchos are characterized, often by people in other states of Venezuela, for being foul-mouthed and vulgar, but these judgments differ by region.

The Maracuchos are distinguished by their use of unique phrases in Venezuela and their use of colloquial language, some examples of which are: ¡Que molleja!, ¡A la vaina!, ¡A la verga! that indicate astonishment, Mollejúo to mean something big. Other expressions such as "Mialma" and "Vergación", for example "¡Mialma, no sabía esa verga!" and the "Vergación" when something seems surprising also to emphasize that if in the size, color, odor and other characteristics of what they refer to, example; "Vergación de grande es tu casa" or "vergación, que molleja de calor hay" usually it is used by the maracaiberos as these expressions are seen as rude or vulgar.

== Sources ==
- Eberhard, David M.; Simons, Gary F.; Fennig, Charles D. (2020). Ethnologue: Languages of the World (23rd ed.). Dallas, Texas: SIL International. Archived from the original on 6 April 2006.
