= Venezuelan Spanish =

Variety of Spanish language

- Castellano venezolano
- Pronunciation: [kasteˈʝano βenesoˈlano]
- Native to: Venezuela
- Region: Venezuela
- Ethnicity: Venezuelans
- Native speakers: 29,794,000 in Venezuela, all users (2014); L1 users: 29,100,000 (2013); L2 users: 694,000 (2013)
- Language family: Indo-European: Italic; Latino-Faliscan; Romance; Western; Ibero-Romance; West Iberian; Castilian; Spanish; Venezuelan Spanish
- Early forms: Old Latin: Classical Latin; Vulgar Latin; Old Spanish; Early Modern Spanish
- Dialects: Amazonian; Llanero; Andino; Western; Eastern; Isleño; Costeño; Zuliano/Maracucho; Central; Oriental; Trinidadian
- Writing system: Latin (Spanish alphabet)

Official status
- Official language in: Venezuela
- Regulated by: Academia Venezolana de la Lengua

Language codes
- ISO 639-1: es
- ISO 639-2: spa
- ISO 639-3: –
- Glottolog: None
- IETF: es-VE
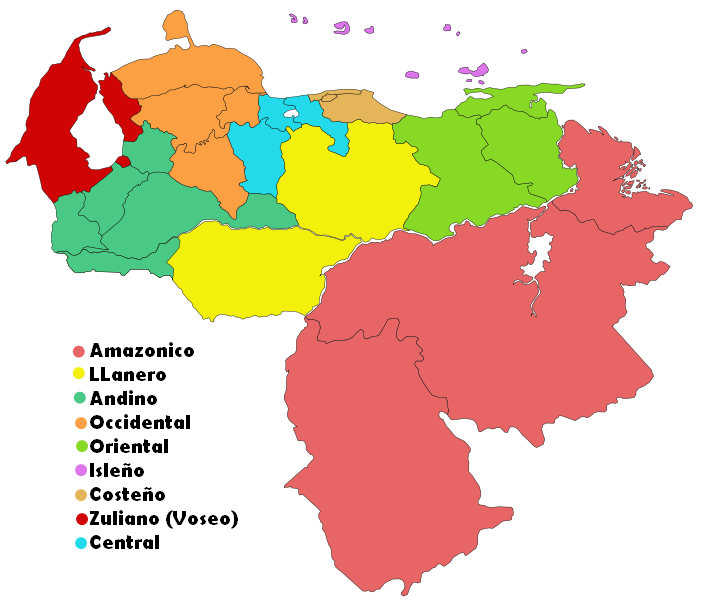
- Kinds of Spanish spoken in Venezuela.

A Wayuu man from Venezuela discussing the preservation of the Wayuu language, in Spanish.

Venezuelan Spanish (castellano venezolano or español venezolano) is the variety of Spanish spoken in Venezuela.

Spanish was introduced in Venezuela by colonists. Most of them were from Galicia, Basque Country, Andalusia, or the Canary Islands. The last has been the most fundamental influence on modern Venezuelan Spanish, and Canarian and Venezuelan accents may even be indistinguishable to other Spanish-speakers.

Italian and Portuguese immigrants from the late 19th and the early 20th century have also had an influence; they influenced vocabulary and its accent, given its slight sing-songy intonation, like Rioplatense Spanish. German settlers also left an influence when Venezuela was contracted as a concession by the King of Spain to the German Welser banking family (Klein-Venedig, 1528–1546).

The Spaniards additionally brought African slaves, which is the origin of expressions such as chévere ("excellent"), which comes from Yoruba ché egberi. Other non-Romance words came from indigenous languages, such as guayoyo (a type of coffee) and caraota (black bean).

== Features ==
- Venezuelan Spanish sometimes shortens words, such as para ("for") to pa'. In addition, /d/ between vowels is sometimes dropped (elision): helado ("ice cream") becomes [eˈlao]. Originally from southern Spain and the Canary Islands, those traits are common to many other Spanish variations and in the Caribbean.
- Another common feature is the debuccalization of syllable-final /s/, whereby adiós ("goodbye") becomes [aˈðjoh] and este ("east") becomes [ˈehte]. It is common to most coastal areas in America, the Canary Islands, and the southern half of Spain.
- Syllable-final /n/ undergoes velarisation. This may also happen before bilabials and alveolars instead of assimilation: ambientación /aNbjeNtaˈsjoN/ ("atmosphere") becomes [aŋbjeŋtaˈsjoŋ] or [ambjentaˈsjoŋ].
- Also like most other American versions of Spanish, Venezuelan Spanish has yeísmo (the merger of /ʎ/ and /ʝ/) and seseo (/θ/ and /s/ are merged). That is, calló ("s/he became silent") and cayó ("s/he fell") are homophones, and casa ("house") is homophonous with caza ("hunt"). Seseo is common to all of America, the Canary Islands, and southern Spain, and yeísmo is prevalent in most Spanish dialects.
- The phoneme /x/ is realized as glottal [h] in the Venezuelan Caribbean and largest area of Venezuela, like in El Salvador, Honduras, Costa Rica, Panama, Nicaragua, Colombia, Ecuadorian coast, Spanish Caribbean islands, Canary Islands, and southern Spain and sometimes in Peru, Chile, and Argentina.
- A characteristic common to Spanish in Venezuela, Colombia, the Dominican Republic, Cuba, and Costa Rica is the use of the diminutive -ico and -ica, instead of the standard -ito and -ita in words with -t in the last syllable: rata ("rat") becomes ratica ("little rat"). Another noteworthy diminutive is "manito," instead of the more common "manita."
- The second-person singular informal pronoun is usually tú, as in most of the rest of Latin America and in Spain. That is referred to as tuteo. However, in Zulia and some parts of Falcón and Trujillo, it is common to find voseo, the use of vos instead of tú. That phenomenon is present in many other Latin American variations (notably Central American Spanish and Rioplatense), but Zulian voseo is diptongado: conjugation preserves the diphthongs of the historical vos conjugation, which have had monophthongization in Rioplatense. The Zulian forms are thus the same as those in Spain for the second-person plural vosotros): instead of tú eres, tú estás, Zulian has vos sois, vos estáis (compare with the plural forms in Spain vosotros sois, vosotros estáis, and with Rioplatense forms, vos sos, vos estás). Another exception to tuteo in Venezuela is the use of the second-person singular formal pronoun usted interchangeably with tú in informal speech, unique to the states of Mérida, Táchira and Trujillo. As in most of the rest of the Americas, the only plural form of the second person is ustedes.
- The word vaina is used with a variety of meanings (such as "shame," "thing, topic," or "pity") and is often an interjection or a nonsensical filler, however is considered a rude word and is usually avoided in formal conversation.
- Venezuelan Spanish has a lot of Italianisms, Gallicisms, Germanisms, and Anglicisms.

== Regional variations ==
There are several subdialects of Venezuelan Spanish:

- The Andean dialect, particularly in the state of Táchira, near the Colombian border, is characterized by a nonaspirated pronunciation of 's', and use of usted instead of tú even in informal contexts. Another variant, in the states of Mérida and Trujillo, still uses usted instead of tú, but has the nonaspirated pronunciation of /s/ as a voiceless alveolar retracted sibilant [s̺], also called apico-alveolar or grave, between [s] and [ʃ]. That phonetic trait, unique in the Americas, is from the large number of northern Spanish settlers in Andean Venezuela.
- The Central dialect, a characteristic marked accent whose use is very common in cities like Caracas, La Guaira, Los Teques, Maracay and Valencia. This dialect is the basis of standard Spanish of Venezuela.
- The Guaro or Larense dialect, spoken initially in Barquisimeto, Cabudare, El Tocuyo and Quíbor, spread throughout the state of Lara and other Central-Western states. In it, the older Spanish verbal inflections -ades, -edes, -odes have become -ás, -és, and -ós: "vos cantáis", "vos coméis", "vos sois."
- The Llanero (plainsman) dialect is spoken in the Venezuelan plains, Los Llanos. One of its characteristics is a considerable aboriginal lexicon, a product of the fusion of Spanish with Indigenous languages.
- The Margaritan dialect (oriental), spoken in Isla Margarita and the northeast of mainland Venezuela. The Margaritan dialect sometimes has an interdental for pre-vowel 's', and uses a strong 'r' instead of 'l' for most words.

The Venezuelan dialect influences of Patois of Trinidad and Papiamento, the language spoken and taught most in Aruba, Bonaire, and Curaçao.

- The Zulian in the northwest of the country, also called maracucho or marabino, uses voseo.
- The Amazon dialect uses nonaspirated pronunciation of 's' and a considerable native lexicon.

== Lexical influences ==
=== Native influence ===
Venezuelan Spanish, like that of the rest of Spanish America and Castilian in general, has taken many words from indigenous languages.

Some examples:

- Arepa (from Cariban).
- Auyama (from Arawakan).
- Budare (from Cariban).
- Casabe (from Cariban).
- Chinchorro (from Chaima).
- Conuco (from Taíno).
- Ocumo (from Arawakan).
- Onoto (from anoto, word from Tamanaku).
- Totuma (from Chaima)

== Common words ==
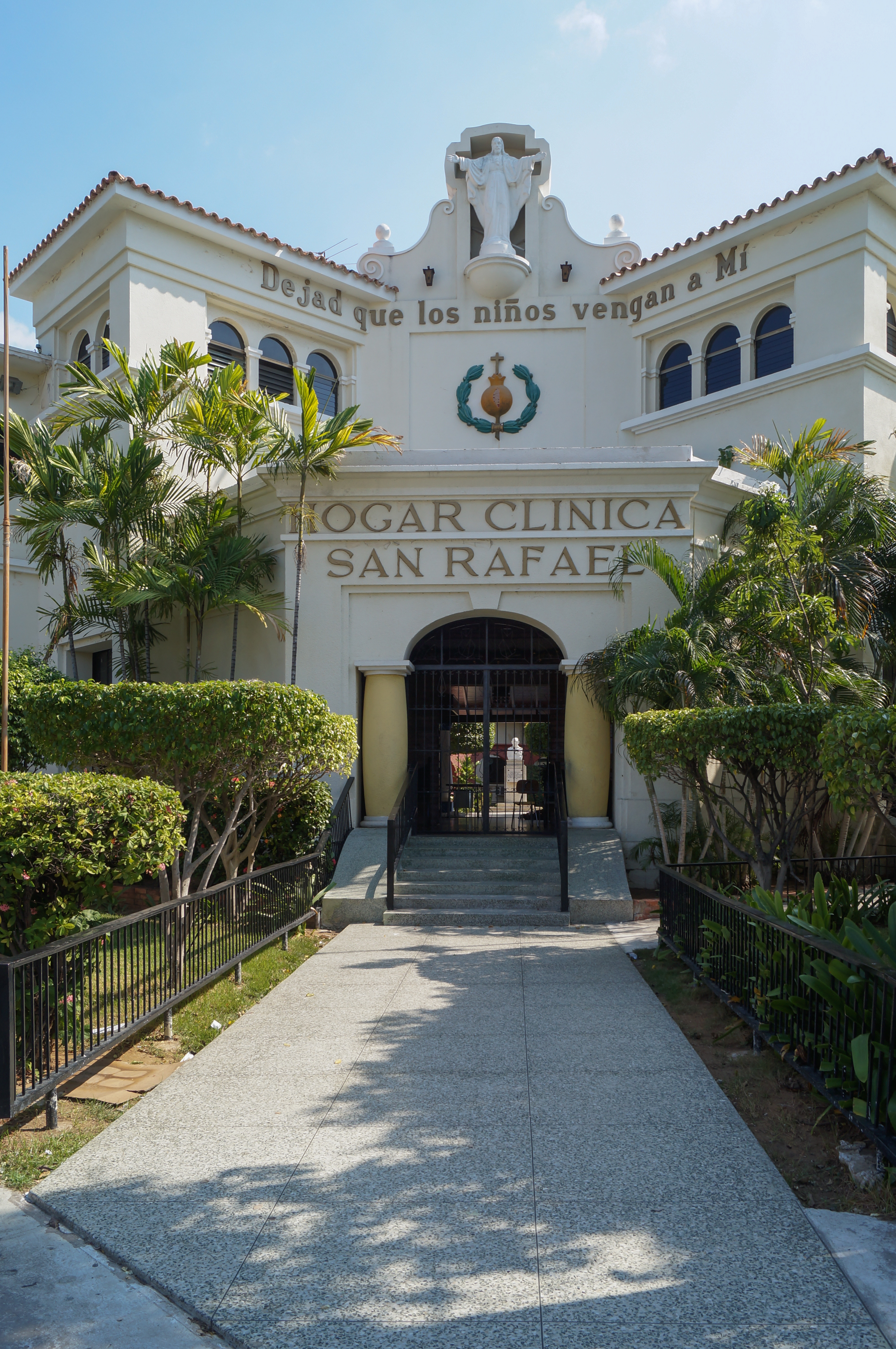
Sign written in European Spanish "Dejad que los niños vengan a Mí" (Let the children come to me) Hogar Clínica San Rafael, Zulia, Venezuela

- A mamar que llegó Tío Rico. = v. Eat up, it's your lucky day (lit: "Tío Rico -a very popular ice cream brand- has arrived")
- Achantado(a) = adj. (or achanta'o/achantá) A person of slow thought or slow reasoning. Someone passive, or lacking seduction skills.
- Achicopalarse = v. To become sad or depressed.
- Agarrado(a) = adj. Selfish. See pichirre.
- Agüevoneado(a) = adj. (or agüevonea'o/agüevonea'a). To be thinking slowly or with poor reasoning, being a sucker. "Ando agüevonia'o" (I didn't get that / I feel like a sucker). Profane.
- Ajá = filler word, used when someone feels ashamed or bothered. "Me volverion a echar del colegio, y ajá, estoy fuera." I was kicked out of school again, and, yeah, I'm out.
- Alborotado(a) = adj. To be excited or in a frenzy.
- Alzado(a) = adj. (or alza'o/alzá) Rebellious, haughty, insurgent. Lit. Lifted, raised.
- Amapuche = n. A passionate demonstration of affection. A warm hug.
- Amuñuñar = v. To tightly yet disorderly put things together.
- Apapacho = n. A hug.
- Arepa = n. Armpit sweat marks. In baseball it also means a score of zero. Lit. Arepa.
- Arrapado = adj. Sexually aroused (profane).
- Arrecharse = v. To get angry (profane).
- Arrecho(a) = adj. Superlative attribute for an object or situation, namely extremely good, bad or difficult (profane). There are differences if someone is arrecho(a) for a finite period of time (to be angry) or if someone is arrecho(a) all the time (has a difficult character or personality). On the other hand, if something is arrecho, it is very good. "Qué arrecha estuvo la fiesta" (the party was awesome). It also has a superlative, "arrechísimo" (extremely good, bad or angry, depending on the context).
- Arrecochinar = v. To gather people disorderly in a small space.
- Arrocear = v. To turn up at a party without being invited.
- Arrocero(a) = n. Party crasher.
- Asaltacunas = n. Someone who likes to date or have sex with people who are significantly younger (+6 years age difference. May include people under legal age). Similar terms in English would be "Manther" (for men) or "Cougar (for women). Lit. "Cradle-robber" or "cradle-snatcher".
- Asaltamecedoras = n. Opposite of the term above. Lit. "Rocker-robber" or "rocker-snatcher" (referring to a Rocking chair)
- Baba = n. A baby/young alligator, caiman, or crocodile. Lit. Saliva.
- Baboso(a) = n. A person who flirts inappropriately.
- Bachaco = n. A blond or redhead mulatto. Lit. Leafcutter ant.
- Bajarse de la mula = exp. To pay for something. To be demanded for money. To be robbed. Lit. "To get off the mule".
- Bájate de esa mata e' coco = exp. "Get your head out of the clouds". To get real. To focus and stop daydreaming. Lit. "Get off that coconut tree."
- Bala fría = n. Junk food. A quick snack. Lit. "Cold bullet".
- Balurdo(a) = adj. or n. (from French Balourd) An awkward or ridiculous person. A low-class person or behavior. See chimbo
- Barrio = n. Poor neighborhood. Often built upwards on hillsides, they are a distinct and noticeable feature of the landscape in large cities in Venezuela.
- Barquilla = n. Ice cream cone.
- Becerro(a) = n. A goofy person. A moron (insult). Lit. Calf (animal). Example: "Sí eres becerro" = You're such a moron.
- Beta = n. A problematic or otherwise interesting situation. For instance: "When we were at the party se armó un beta and the police arrived".
- Bicha = adj. A girl/woman of bitchy behavior, foxy lady, vixen. Used as a noun, it can also mean a firearm, mostly a pistol.
- Birra = n. Beer.
- Biyuyo = n. Money. See churupo and real.
- Bochinche = n. A gathering or noisy party. Disorder, chaos, but usually in a funny way. See jodedera.
- Boleta = adj. To be indiscreet. Example: "No seas boleta" = Don't be indiscreet. Used when someone indiscreetly looks at another person, or imprudently listens to someone else's conversation. Also means a grade, mark, qualification. A description for some people who dress and talk in a marginal way. See Tuki, Tierrúo. Lit. Ticket, note.

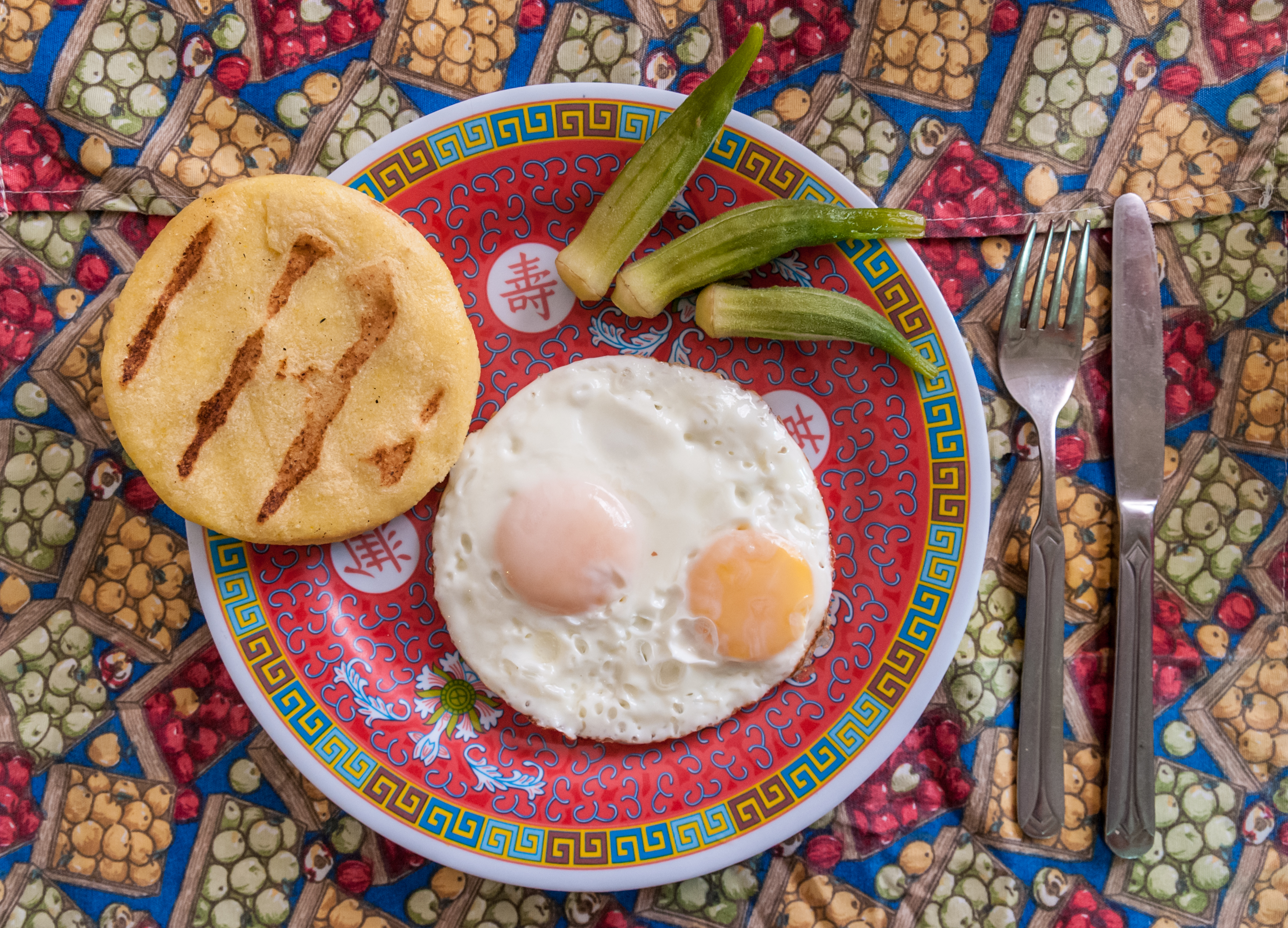
Arepa is a typical Venezuelan dish

- Bolo = n. A single unit of Venezuelan currency. Similar to calling the U.S. Dollar a "buck."
- Bolsa = n. (or Bolsiclón) A moron. Lit. Bag.
- Broma = n. A thing. Example: "Sólo agarra esa broma y vámonos" = Just take that thing and let's go. Also, it can be used as a synonym (and a less "harsh" version) for "vaina" (See vaina). Lit. Joke.
- Bucear = v. To ogle discreetly. To peep furtively. Lit. To skin dive.
- Bululú = n. A fuss. A place in which there is a noisy crowd, and not always partying.
- Burda = adv. or adj. (superlative) Very much. Example: "Caminamos burda" = We walked a lot. "Ella es burda de linda" = She's very pretty.
- Buzo = n. Peeper. Lit. Diver. See bucear.
- Cachapera = n. A lesbian (pejorative). Lit. Woman who makes cachapas.
- Cacharro/a = n. Old, worn out vehicle. A piece of junk.
- Cachicamo = n. Armadillo.
- Cachúo(a) = adj. (or cachudo(a)) Someone who has been cheated on by his partner. In Zulia, it means "horny" instead. (profane). Lit. With horns (See cuckold.)
- Cacri = n. A mongrel (that usually is a stray dog as well). The term is a mix between "callejero" (stray) and "criollo" (see criollo) and derives from the fact that there are a lot of stray dogs and mixed-breed dogs in Venezuela.
- Caerse a palos = exp. To engage in heavy drinking. To get drunk. To be beaten up. Lit. "To fall with sticks". See "palos" and "rumba de palos".
- Cagón(a) = adj. Coward or fearful person (profane). Lit. Shitter.
- Calarse = v. To tolerate something bad, to put up with something.
- Calientahuevo = adj. (or calientagüevo) A person (usually female) that insinuates sexual interest but at the end doesn't do anything (profane).
- Caligüeva = n. Sluggishness, boredom (mildly profane).
- Cambur = n. A well remunerated job in government. Lit. Banana.
- Cambur y peo = A person that, usually pretending to know/be familiar with something, does not even try to accomplish his/her promises, a talker. Example: "¡Eres puro cambur y peo!". A plan/prospect that was meant to be taken seriously is never made reality (profane). Lit. "Banana and fart".
- Caña = n. Booze, an alcoholic drink. Also, it's often referred as "curda".
- Carajo(a) = n. A person (profane). Lit. Crow's nest.
- Carajazo = n. See coñazo (profane).
- Carajito(a) = n. A kid (sometimes pejorative. Profane). Diminutive of "carajo".
- Caraotas = n. Beans. In Venezuela, caraotas are black by default. Should beans be of a different color, the name of the color must be used. Example: "Caraotas blancas" = white beans, "Caraotas rojas" = red beans.
- Cartuchera = n. A pencil case. Lit. "Cartridge belt" or "cartridge box".
- Catire(a) = adj. or n. Generic for a beer. Also a nickname for the Sun. Derived from the literal meaning of catire/catira as blond man/blonde woman.
- Caucho(s) = n. Generic for a vehicle tire or tires. Lit. Natural rubber.
- Cazón = n. Young shark. Lit. School shark.
- Chalequeo = n. Persistent taunt, mockery or bullying.
- Chalequear = v. To (continuously) mock or taunt someone for an indefinite period of time.
- Chamo(a) = n. Boy/girl. With suffix -ito: a kid; also means son or daughter. Venezuelans are well known among Spanish speakers for their love and constant use of this word, which is used repeatedly in the same fashion as the American slang dude.
- Chamba= n. Job.
- Chambear v. To work. If you're looking to sound more like a local, drop trabajar for chambear ahora mismo!
- Chao = exp. (from the Italian "ciao") To bid farewell, similar to "bye".
- Chaparro = n. Slang for penis. See güevo and piripicho. Lit. Short person, shorty.
- Chévere = adj. Fine, cool, great. Also used to express agreement.
- Chencho(a) = n. See Tierrúo(a).
- Chigüire = n. Capybara.
- Chimo = n. Andean expression for chewing tobacco
- Chimbo(a) = adj. Lousy. Of low quality. Bootleg. Ill made. Fake. Uncool.
- Chino(a) = n. Andean expression meaning child, kid.
- Chinchorro = n. A hammock.
- Chino(a) = n. Andean expression for a boy or girl, particularly in the Trujillo State. Lit. Chinese person.
- Chiripiolca = n. When a person is restless, anxious or nervous. Mostly refers when someone suddenly get mad or crazy. Example: "Le dió la chiripiolca" = She/he gets crazy. From El Chavo del Ocho.
- Chivo = n. The boss, someone at a high position in an organization. Lit. Goat. Example: "El chivo que más mea" (The goat that pisses the most) = the most important person.
- Chulo = n. Person who lives from/takes advantage from others, often financially. Lit. Pimp.
- Chupichupi = n. (Also chupi chupi) A water-based frozen snack in a plastic tube, a freezie.
- Chupón = n. A pacifier. A hickey. Lit. Sucker.
- Churupo = n. Money.
- Chola = n./adj. Flip-flops/slippers. Accelerator pedal. Also means "speedy", for example: "Dale chola!" (Hurry up!) or "Yo iba demasiado chola" (I was going too fast). A popular radio personality in Venezuela has the nickname "Full Chola" (Speedy)
- Choro(a) = n. Thief, robber (pejorative).
- Cocoya = n. Vagina (profane). See totona.
- Cocuy = n. Liquor distilled from the fermented juices of the head, body or leaves of agav similar to Tequila typical of Falcon State
- Coger cola pa'l (para el) cielo = exp. To masturbate (only used for male masturbation. Profane). Lit. "Hitchhike to heaven".
- Cojeculo = n. Chaos, disaster, clusterfuck. A chaotic crowd in which anything can happen (profane). See bululú.
- Conejo(a) = n. A naive person. Lit. Rabbit.
- Coñazo = n. A violent hit or strike (profane). It can also mean a lot of when used with the preposition de. Example: "Había un coñazo de gente en la fiesta" (There were many people at the party).
- Coñito(a) = n. A kid (profane), mainly used in Zulia.
- ¡Coño! = exp. "Damn!" or "fuck!" (profane, widely used).
- Coño de madre = n. A rotten bastard. (profane). Lit. "Mother's cunt".
- ¡Coño de la madre! = exp. "Oh, my fucking God!", used to denote high frustration and anger (very profane). Lit. "Mother's cunt!"
- Compinche = n. Partner, friend, buddy. See pana.
- Contorno = n. A side dish. From Italian.
- Coroto(s) = n. Stuff, belongings. Word derives from Jean-Baptiste-Camille Corot's last name.
- Costilla = n. Spouse or partner. An affectionate way of a person to refer to a very close friend. Lit. Rib.
- Cotorra = n. A lie. See embuste. Lit. Parrot. Chatterbox.
- Cotufas = n. Popcorn. Presumably derived from "corn to fry".
- Creerse la gran vaina = exp. To be arrogant. Example: "Ella se cree la gran vaina" = She's so full of herself.
- Criollo(a) = n. A local. A native of Venezuela. Something typically native. Lit. Creole.
- Cuaima = n. A very jealous/possessive and untrusting wife/girlfriend. Lit. Bushmaster (a kind of poisonous snake).
- Cuca = n. Vagina (profane). See Pepita.
- Cuchi = adj. Cute, nice, pretty.
- Culo = n. Booty. A young attractive person that one would usually date, go out with or have sex with (profane). Lit. Ass.
- Culillo = n. Much fear (mildly profane). Lit. Small ass.
- Curdo = adj. Drunk. See rascado(a).
- Dar pao-pao = exp. To beat-up or spank someone. It's mostly used as a warning to disobedient or rude children.
- De pana = exp. Seriously. For real.
- De pinga = exp. Cool, superb, excellent. See pepiado.
- Echarle bolas = exp. To put a lot of effort on something.
- Echarle los perros a alguien = exp. (or echar los perros) To flirt with someone. Lit. "To throw the dogs at someone".
- Echón(a) = adj. Arrogant.
- Embuste = n. A lie.
- Embustero(a) = n. A liar.
- Empate = n. Romantic relationship. Lit. Tie, draw.
- Encaletar = v. to hide something or to keep information to oneself in a particular sneaky way.
- Enchivarse = v. To borrow something, use hand-me-downs (usually clothes).
- Enchufado(a) = the Venezuelan idiom used to refer to the people who benefit of systemic cronyism by leveraging high-level political connections for personal or professional gain. Lit. Plugged, connected.
- Ennotado = adj. See nota.
- Epa/Épale = exp. Hi or Hello (informal greeting; "What's up"). Also used to express surprise. Close to the Lit. Hey.
- Estar cagado(a) = exp. To be scared (profane). Lit. "To be shitted".
- Estar empatado(a) = exp. To be in a relationship. Lit. "To be tied".
- Estar encarpado = exp. (Also as a verb; encarparse) To have an erection. Derives from "carpa" (tent). Equivalent of the expression "To pitch a tent".
- Enrollado = n. A very complicated person.
- Estar fregado(a) = exp. To be screwed. Lit. "To be scrubbed".
- Estar mosca = exp. To be alert. Lit. "To be a fly".
- Estar salado(a) = exp. To have bad luck. Lit. "To be salty".
- Fajado(a) = n. Someone who works pretty hard/much on something. See fajarse.
- Fajarse = v. (or estar fajado(a)) To focus and work the hardest on something until getting it done. Example: "¡Tienes que fajarte con eso!" = You have to work very hard on that!. Similar to Echarle bolas.
- Faramallero = n. a derogatory term to refer to a boastful person.
- Fino = n. Fine, cool or great. It is used in the same fashion as the slang "sweet". Adjective. Example: "Eso está fino" = that is fine.
- Filo = n. Hunger. Lit. Edge. Example: "Llevo el filo parejo" = it does not exactly translate but it is like saying "I'm very hungry".
- Firifiri = n. (Also firi firi) A very skinny, weak or malnourished person (Somewhat pejorative).
- Flaco(a) = n. A slim or skinny person (Usually used in an affectionate way).
- Flaquito(a) = n. Diminutive of flaco(a).
- Franela = n. T-shirt.
- Fregar = v. To suffer the consequences of a wrong decision. To screw up. To annoy. To kill. To scrub.
- Fororo = n. Synonym for energy, strength, and practicality. It's a type of flour made from toasted corn of Canarian origin. Its smooth flavor and texture make it a versatile cornmeal substitute and an ally for numerous food recipes.
- Fumado(a) = adj. or n. Stoned. Crazy, disheveled, difficult to understand. Lit. past participle of the verb "fumar", to smoke.
- Fumar(se) una lumpia = exp. used when someone makes wild assumptions or comes up with unrealistic explanations to a situation. Lit. "to smoke a (Chinese) egg roll."
- Gafo(a) = adj. or n. Silly. Comes for the Italian word "cafone" or "gavone" which means dumb peasant.
- Gago(a) = n. Someone who talks with a stammer or stutter.
- Gargajo = n. Spit, a loogie.
- Gocho(a) = adj. or n. A native of the Venezuelan Andes, particularly the states of Mérida, Táchira or Trujillo.
- Golilla = adj. or n. Thing of low commercial value, easy to buy or acquire (colloquial form of the word cheap). Example: "¡qué barato, una golilla!" = what a bargain, that is so cheap!. Sometimes used to refer to something easy to do.
- Gordo(a) = n. A term of endearment similar to darling or baby, more often used by women to refer to their sons or boyfriends. Lit. chubby or fat person.
- Gordito(a) = n. Diminutive of Gordo(a).
- Gorila = adj. A glutton. Also used to refer to abusive person. In politics used as a synonym to dictator or despot.
- Gringo(a) = n. American (of the USA).
- Guachicón = n. (Northeastern Venezuelan usage) An athletic shoe, sneaker.
- Guachimán = n. A security guard, sometimes also applied to doormen. Derived from "watchman".
- Guáramo = n. Iron will. Courage.
- Guaro = n. A native of Lara state.
- Guasacaca = n. A sauce made from avocados and spices. Resembles Mexican Guacamole.
- Guate = n. Excrement (mildly profane).
- Guayabo = n. To be romantically disillusioned. To have the Blues. Lit. Tree of the guava fruit.
- Guayoyo = n. Slightly watered down black coffee, commonly served after meals.
- Güevo = n. Dick, penis. Nuisance (profane). Derives from "huevo" (egg). See pipe.
- Háblame el mío/háblame la mía = exp. Similar to "What's up?" or "What's going on?". Lit. Talk to me dude/talk to me girl.
- Hallaquero = n. Tamale maker.
- Huevón(a) (or güevón(a)) = n. Sucker, asshole, push-over, idiot (profane). However, it can also be used as the Spanish equivalent for "dude".
- Huevonada (or güevonada) = n. See mariquera (profane).
- Huevo pelado (or huevo pelao) = n. an expert, talented, knows what he or she is doing (mildly profane).
- Igualado(a) = adj. A demeaning term to describe someone who pretends to be of a superior financial/intellectual level than the person really is.
- Jalabola = n. (or jala bola) Ass-kisser (mildly profane). See below.
- Jalar bola = v. To abuse flattering. Sweet talking, intended to get benefit from someone with selfish purposes. Similar to the expression "scratch your back" (mildly profane). Lit. To pull ball.
- Jamón = n. A French kiss. Something very easy to do. A nice girl. Lit. Ham.
- Jamoneo = n. French kissing. Also used as a verb ("Jamonear" or "Jamonearse").
- Jeva = n. Woman, girlfriend.
- Joda = n. Joke.
- Jodedera = n. Mockery. When a bunch people get together and act foolishly or play pranks on a person/another group of people (mildly profane).
- Jodido = adj. Difficult (mildly profane). See pelúo(a)
- Lacra = n. See rata
- Ladilla = adj. or n. Something annoying or boring. A boring or annoying person (mildly profane). Lit. Crab louse.
- Lambucio(a) = n. A glutton. Someone who requests food or goods in a rude way.
- Lata = n. Kiss on the mouth/lips. Lit. Can. Also used as an expression: "Darse latas" or "darse las latas" (Lit. "To give each other the cans") which means "to make out".
- La Pelona = n. An impersonation of death. The Grim Reaper. Example: A Juana le apareció La Pelona.
- Lechúo(a) = adj or n. (or lechudo(a)) Lucky.
- Lomito = adj or n. Cut of beef (Tenderloin). Also used to connote very high quality, or the best one among a group. Example "(Eso es) puro lomito".
- Macundales = n. Gear, stuff, personal belongings. Derived from the brand "Mac and Dale" (a belt to carry tools used by the oil industry workers in Venezuela). See Corotos.
- Malandro(a) = n. Gangster, thug, thief, burglar, robber.
- Mamar = v. (As a verb) To be penniless. Example: "Estar mamando". (As an adjective) To be tired. Example: "Estar mamado". Lit. "To suck".
- Mamahuevo = n. (or mamagüevo) Cocksucker. Fluffer (profane).
- Mamarracho(a) = n. Someone who makes things of a very bad quality.
- Mamarrachada = n. Something done/made in a messy or poor way.
- Mamar gallo = exp. To trick, fool or tease someone. Lit. "To suck rooster".
- Mamita = n. (or mamacita) An attractive woman/young woman. Also used as a synonym of "mami" (mommy).
- Mamón = n. Mamoncillo.
- Manganzón(a) = n. A lazy person.
- Mantecado = Vanilla flavored ice cream.
- Maracucho(a) = n. (or marabino(a)) A native of Maracaibo or its neighborhoods.
- Marico = n. Commonly used as "dude" between friends. "Marica" may also be used between girl friends (mildly profane/pejorative). Lit. Gay man (slur).
- Mariquera = n. (or maricada) A small, insignificant thing. A non-transcendental fact. A synonym for Vaina. Lit. Gay thing (mildly profane).
- Matar un tigre = exp. To moonlight. To have a temporary job. Lit. "To kill a tiger".
- Matraquear = v. To blackmail, to demand compensation in exchange of something, especially by corrupt cops.
- Mente de pollo(a) = n. (or mentepollo(a)) A dumb or immature person. Lit "Chicken-minded".
- Merengada = n. A milkshake.
- Meter casquillo = exp. To stir up trouble or drama, usually by "planting" malicious gossips and rumors.
- Miche = n. Andean expression for alcoholic drink distillate from sugar cane juice fermentation.
- Mojón = n. A lie, bullshit. Lit. Piece of excrement (mildly profane)
- Mojonero(a) = n. Liar. Person who propagates "mojones" (mildly profane). See above.
- Molleja = exp. Term used to exaggerate, emphasize or express surprise, mainly used in Zulia. Lit. Gizzard.
- Moreno(a) = n. Someone who has tan skin. When the person has a light tan or olive skin, this is usually referred to as "trigueño(a)", which derives from "trigo" (wheat). "Morena" also means "moray eel". Lit. Brunet/brunette.
- Mortadela. = n. From the Italian "Mortadella" (a cheaper food made from pork and chicken)
- Musiú = n. (from French Monsieur) A foreigner. Originally used to refer to European immigrants from a non-Hispanic country; the term is currently generally used to describe someone who is not familiar with local Venezuelan customs or idiosyncrasies and has a hard time fitting in. "Hacerse el musiú" ("pass as a foreigner") is a common expression used when someone pretends that he/she does not understand a situation in order to avoid any involvement.
- ¡Na' guará! = exp. An expression to denote surprise, bewilderment. Most commonly used in Lara state.
- Negrear = v. To treat someone badly, to forget or exclude somebody, as an allusion to when black people were victims of racism. Despite its origin, nowadays the term has no racist undertone. Any person can say the word to another one regardless of the color of their skin. Example: "Me negrearon" = They excluded me. Derives from "negro" (black).
- Nevera = n. Refrigerator.
- Niche = adj. See "chimbo(a)". Of low class.
- Nojoda = exp. Venezuelan equivalent of the English curse word "Goddammit" (profane).
- Nota = n. Something nice, neat, or pleasant. A drug trip, to be "high". Lit. Note. Verbal form: Ennotarse.
- O sea = exp. A form to say whatever or "I mean". A filler word. Lit. Or Like. Example: "¿O sea, cómo lo hicíste?" (Like, how'd you do it!?).
- Paja = n. Bullshit. "Hablar paja" = to bullshit someone. "Hacerse la paja" = to masturbate (profane). Lit. Hay, straw.
- Pajizo(a) = adj. (from paja) Someone who masturbates a lot (profane). Lit. "Wanker".
- Pajúo(a) = n. A loose synonym for pendejo or güevón (mildly profane). Also, it means "Snitch".
- Paisano = n. From the Italian "Paesano", meaning a Venezuelan or Italian (or southern European). It is used to describe, in a friendly way, those who are originally from the same world region or country. For instance, a Venezuelan Middle-Eastern can refer to another Middle-Eastern as a "paisano."
- Panetón = n. From "panettone", meaning an Italian Christmas bread
- Pasticho = n. From Italian "pasticcio" (a lasagna)
- Palo = n. Alcoholic beverage. Lit. Stick. Example: "¡Tómate un palito, pues!" = Have a little drink (then)!
- Palo de agua = n. Torrential rain. Lit. Stick of water.
- Pana = n. Friend, buddy, dude. Mostly applied to men. Interchangeable with Chamo. Lit Corduroy
- Pantallear: v. To lavishly flash oneself or anything of value. Derived from "pantalla" (screen).
- Pantallero: n. A show-off. See above.
- Paño = n. Towel.
- Papia'o = adj. Of muscular build. Buff. Derives from "papa" (potato).
- Papear = v. To eat.
- Papito = n. (or papacito) An attractive man/young man. Also used as a synonym of "papi" (daddy).
- Papo n. Vagina (profane).
- Parcha/parchita= n. Gay man (slur). Lit. Passion fruit.
- Pargo = n. Gay man (slur). Lit. Red snapper.
- Pasar roncha = exp. To have a bad moment or experience, or to find many obstacles.
- Pasapalo = n. Appetizer. Snack. Hors d'oeuvres.
- Pato = n. Gay man (slur). Lit. Duck. Possibly derived from the duck test
- Pava = n. Bad luck, ill omen.
- Pavo(a) = adj. or n. A trendy or well dressed adolescent, kid, youngster. Lit. Turkey.
- Pavosaurio = n. An older person who tries to act young. Lit. Turkey + dinosaur.
- Peaje = n. Illegal fee. Lit. Toll. See also bajarse de la mula.
- Pelando bola = v. (in the continuous tense.) To be out of money or with nothing to do/bored. Lit. Peeling ball
- Pelín = n. A little bit, a small amount.
- Pelón(a) = n. Error, mistake or someone who has bad aim. Lit. Bald or peeled.
- Pelúo(a) = adj. (or peludo(a)) Very difficult. Lit. Hairy.
- Peluquearse = v. To go to a hair salon and get your hair fixed/styled.
- Pendejo(a) = adj. or n. An idiot, a pushover. See huevón.
- Pendejada = n. See mariquera.
- Peorro(a) = adj. Mediocre, inferior (mildly profane).
- Pepiado adj. (or pepeado/pepiao) Cool, superb, excellent.
- Pepa = n. Seed. Also a pimple.
- Pepita = Lit. Seed, nugget.
- Perico = n. Venezuelan-style scrambled eggs with onions, tomatoes, and often bell peppers. Also used to describe cocaine. Lit. Parakeet.
- Perinola = n. Cup-and-ball toy.
- Perol = n. A coroto, a kettle.
- Picado(a) = adj. Ticked off, feeling upset (most likely after being insulted or proven wrong) while at the same time hiding or denying the feeling. Lit. Stung. In the coastal region it is used to mean an agitated sea: "El mar está picado".
- Picar = verb. To provoke. To say or do something that would lead a person to become "Picado" o "Picada". Also, eat a snack. Lit. Sting, or slice.
- Pichirre = adj. Stingy, selfish, miser, cheap.
- Pinga = n. See below.
- Pipe = n. Dick, penis (profane). See güevo.
- Pipirisnais = adj. (Also pipirisnice or pipirisnai) A very cool or skilled person. Example: "Él se cree un pipirisnais" = He thinks he's so cool.
- Pipí frío = exp. (or pipe frío) Someone that has been single or haven't had sex for a long time. Someone lacking social skills or uninteresting. Lit. "Cold penis".
- Piripicho = n. Penis.
- Plaga = n. A mosquito. A swarm of mosquitoes. A mischievous person, a pest. (See Rata). Lit. Plague.
- Planetario(a) = adj. Crazy, insane. "No soy loco, soy planetario" (I'm not crazy, I'm planetary), became a popular catch-phrase after it was used by a patient in a mental institution during the filming of a documentary.
- Pocotón = n. A lot, a large amount.
- Pollo(a) = n. A childish, naive or immature person. Lit. Chicken.
- Polvo = n. Coitus. Copulation. Lit. Dust.
- Ponsigué = n. Ber.
- Prendido(a) = adj. Tipsy, wanting more. Lit. Ignited, turned on.
- Puta = n. Used in many cases to mean slut. Lit. Whore, prostitute (profane).
- Queso = n. Sexual drive, Lust. Mostly applied to men. Lit. Cheese. Example: "Tengo queso" = I'm horny.
- Quesúo(a) = adj. (or quesudo(a)) Horny, lustful.
- Rabipelado = n. Opossum.
- Rancho = n. A shanty house. A precarious makeshift home found in barrios or favelas made out of whatever the builder may find, including cardboard, wood, metal rods, zinc sheets. These have a tendency to evolve into brick houses and sometimes 3-story buildings as the owner acquires more materials. Lit. Ranch, although in Venezuela this word is never used to refer to a ranch or farmland.
- Rascado(a) = adj. Drunk.
- Raspar = v. To fail a course, exam or subject. Example: ¡Chamo, raspé Inglés! = Dude, I failed English!. Lit. To scrape/scratch.
- Rata = n. An evil or treacherous person. Lit. Rat.
- Ratón = n. Hangover. Lit. Mouse. Example: "Tengo ratón" = I've got a hangover.
- Raya = exp. (or rayón) An embarrassment. The expression "¡Qué rayón!" means "How embarrassing" or "That's so embarrassing".
- Real = n. Money.
- Rico(a) = adj. or n. An attractive person. Delicious, pleasurable, used similarly to the word yummy. Lit. Rich.
- Rollo = n. a problem, a mess. Lit. roll.
- Rumba = n. A party. Also used as a verb "rumbear", to party.
- Rumba de coñazos = exp. To violently and exaggeratedly hit or strike for a while (profane). Example: "¡Te voy a dar una rumba de coñazos!" = I'm gonna kick your ass!/I'm gonna kill you! See salita.
- Rumba de palos = exp. To be beaten up. In a sports context, whenever a team wins over another with a large score.
- Rumbero(a) = n. A partygoer.
- Sacar la piedra = exp. To bother or exasperate someone, similar to "busting your balls".
- Salita = n. A violent game, bullying method or hazing ritual that goes like this: A bunch of people (usually males) get together, then discreetly select a person as a "target" or "victim" (male, most of the time) and set a word/gesture as a signal. Next, they follow, pretend or trick the person so they get close to them. After that, one of them gives the signal and they start to repeatedly smack the "target" for a short period of time (between 3 and 15 seconds) until they just stop or the person either defends themselves or runs away.
- Santamaría = n. Rollup metal door to secure storefronts. Example: "Bajaron la santamaría" = "They closed their doors". Lit. Holy Mary.
- Sapo = n. A snitch, informer. Lit. Toad.
- Ser pila = exp. (or ser pilas) To be smart and/or alert. Pila means battery.
- Sifrino(a) = adj. A wealthy, snobby, arrogant person. adj. Posh, applied to people and things, such as an accent or clothes. In the case of people most often used to refer to teenagers. It is somewhat common for sifrinos to use Spanglish; the crutch word "O sea" and demeaning gestures such as the L.
- Tequeño = n. A deep-fried flour roll filled with cheese, similar to cheese sticks. Lit. A native from the city of Los Teques.
- Teta = n. A source of guaranteed income. A ball/scoop of ice cream, sorbet or frozen flavored water wrapped in a small plastic bag that is eaten by opening a hole on the tip and sucking on it. Lit. Tit, female breast.
- Tetilla = n. Male breast, male nipple.
- Tigre = n. Second job or night job, moonlighting. See Matar un tigre. Lit. Tiger.
- Tierrúo(a) = n. (or tierrudo(a)) A person (generally of low class) who behaves, dresses or says things in a vulgar or uneducated way. Also, could be considered an opposite of "sifrino(a)". It derives from "tierra" (soil) which is something associated with dirt.
- Tirar = v. To have sex. Lit. To throw.
- Totona = n. Vagina (profane).
- Toñeco = adj. A person who likes to receive a lot of affection through cuddles, caresses, kisses, or similar physical contact. Example: "Mi bebé es muy toñeco" = My baby loves my affection.
- Trácala n. (or tracalería) Trick, fraud.
- Tripeo = n. Something that is very enjoyable. Example: "Qué tripeo esta vaina" = This is really fun. Also used as a verb; "tripear".
- Tripón = n. Kid.
- Tufo n. Bad underarm odor. See violín.
- Tuki n. See choro.
- Ubícate = exp. "Get real". Lit. "Locate yourself".
- Vacilar = v. To enjoy something/have a good time. Example: "Estoy vacilando" = I am having fun. Also used as a noun: "Vacile", as in "qué malvacile" = What a bad time. Lit. vacillate
- Vaina = adj. or n. Thing, annoyance, problem, predicament, situation, endeavor, liaison. Vaina is one of the most versatile Venezuelan words, not necessarily having a negative connotation (mildly profane). Lit. Pod, sheath.
- Verga = n. Dick (profane) exp. Used to convey a feeling of shock, disgust or alert (profane). In the Western part of the country, especially in Zulia state, it is a nonsensical filler as an alternative to vaina.
- ¡Vergación! = exp. superlative form of verga (profane), mainly used in Zulia.
- Vergajazo = n. See coñazo (profane), mainly used in Zulia.
- Vergatario(a) = adj. Something excellent, or someone who has done something very well (mildly profane).
- Verguero = n. Brawl, havoc (profane), mainly used in Zulia. See cojeculo.
- Vete al carajo = exp. (or vete al coño de tu madre) "Fuck you" or "Go fuck yourself". Lit. "Go to the crow's nest" / "Go to your mother's cunt" (profane).
- ¡Vete al coñísimo de tu madre! = exp. Superlative form of the term above (very profane).
- Violín = n. Bad odor in armpits. See Tufo. Lit. Violin.
- Yesquero = n. A lighter.
- Yeyo = n. Low blood pressure, dizziness or faint generally caused by a strong impression or stress.
- Zampar = v. To French kiss somebody.
- Zamuro = n. A stalker. Lit. Vulture.
- Zanahoria = n. Someone who zealously takes care of his/her own health. A vegetarian. A person that behaves well, nerd. Straight, clean. adj. A boring, dull person. Lit. Carrot.
- Zancudo = n. Mosquito. Lit. "The one that walks on stilts" as a metaphor for the insect's long legs.
- Zapatero = exp. Similar to thrashing or rout but more specifically when the defeated team did not score. Lit. Shoemaker.
- Zapatos de goma = n. Sneakers. Lit. Rubber soled shoes.
- Zapatos de patente = n. Patent-leather shoes.
- Zumbado(a) = adj. (or zumba'o/zumbá) Forward, crazy, nutty, careless person.

== See also ==
- Academia Venezolana de la Lengua
- Llanero Spanish
- Maracucho Spanish

== Sources ==
- Español venezolano, Español maracucho and Voseo in the Spanish Wikipedia.
- Alexandra Alvarez & Ximena Barros (2000). "Sistemas en conflicto: las formas de tratamiento en la ciudad de Mérida, Venezuela". Lengua y Habla. Archived from the original on 2006-07-21.
