= Amazonic Spanish =

South American language

- español amazónico, español de la selva
- Pronunciation: [espaˈɲol amaˈsoniko], [espaˈɲol de la ˈselβa]
- Native to: Peru
- Region: Ucayali River, Department of Loreto
- Ethnicity: Peruvians and some Colombians
- Native speakers: 2,700 (2011)
- Language family: Indo-European: Italic; Latino-Faliscan; Latinic; Romance; Italo-Western; Western; Gallo-Iberian; Ibero-Romance; West Iberian; Castilian; Spanish; Peruvian Spanish; Amazonic Spanish
- Early forms: Old Latin: Vulgar Latin; Proto-Romance; Old Spanish; Early Modern Spanish

Language codes
- ISO 639-3: spq
- Glottolog: lore1243 Peruvian Amazonian Spanish

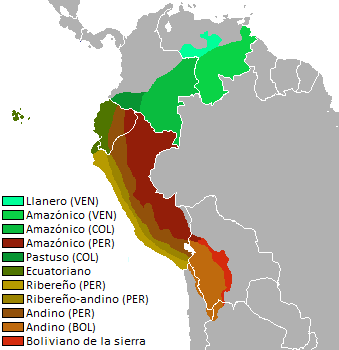
A map of interior Amazonian Spanish dialects

Amazonic Spanish (español amazónico), also known as Charapa Spanish, Loreto-Ucayali Spanish or informally known in Peru simply as Jungle Spanish (español de la selva), is a variety of Spanish spoken in the Amazon, especially in the Peruvian provinces of Loreto, San Martín and Ucayali. Amazonic Spanish is also spoken in areas of Brazil adjoining Loreto and Ucayali and in the Amazonas Department of Colombia.

== Distinctive features ==
=== Morphosyntax ===
One of the distinguishing features of Amazonic Spanish is the method of constructing the possessive form: speakers say "de la X su Y" (of the X its Y), instead of standard Spanish "la Y de X" (the Y of X). Another distinctive grammatical feature is the use of possessive forms in place of certain genitive forms; compare standard Spanish "Le preguntó a la yaminahua delante de mí" (He asked the Yaminahua woman in front of me) with the Loreto-Ucayali "Le preguntó a la yaminahua en mi delante" (He asked the Yaminahua woman in my front).

Personal names are prefixed with a definite article (el or la, depending on the gender).

=== Phonology ===
/x/ and especially the sequence /xw/ are frequently realized as [f] (as in Juana [ˈfana]).

Amazonic Spanish also incorporates words and expressions borrowed from local indigenous languages.

== Status ==
Amazonic Spanish is classified as a separate language from standard Spanish by Ethnologue, with its own ISO 639-3 code: spq. A change request from 2020 to merge the language into Spanish (spa) was rejected by SIL.
