= Andean Spanish =

Dialect

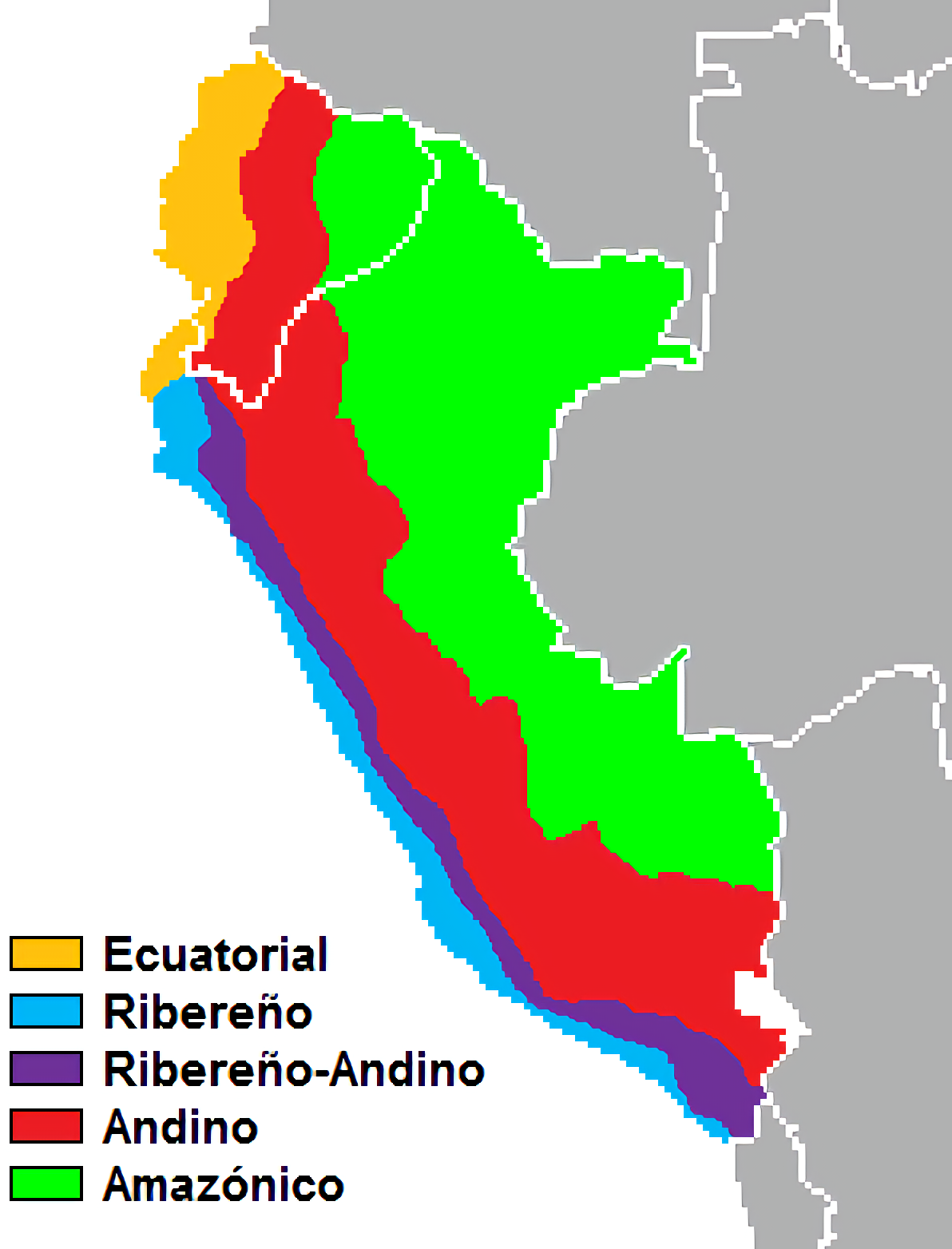
Dialect map of Peru and Ecuador. Andean Spanish is in red and purple.

Andean Spanish (Spanish: Español andino) is a dialect of Spanish spoken in the central Andes, from southern Colombia, with influence as far south as northern Chile and Northwestern Argentina, passing through Ecuador, Peru, and Bolivia. While similar to other Spanish dialects, Andean Spanish shows influence from Quechua, Aymara, and other indigenous languages, due to prolonged and intense language contact. This influence is especially strong in rural areas.

== Phonology ==
- In Andean Spanish, the /s/ is never aspirated in the final position and so is pronounced [s], not [h]. In northern Chile, syllable-final /s/ is mostly aspirated.
- In parts of highland Peru, especially Cusco and Puno, /s/ is sometimes pronounced apical, rather than laminal.
- As in all Latin American dialects of Spanish, Andean Spanish has seseo (/θ/ is not distinguished from /s/). Thus, casa ("house") and caza ("hunt") are homophones. However, in Cusco Region and Cajamarca, many speakers realize /s/ as [θ] in many words, particularly in once, doce, trece. Seseo is common to all of America, the Canary Islands, and several areas in southern Spain.
- Especially in the Ecuadorian variant, coda /s/ is often voiced to [z] before a vowel or before a voiced consonant (including sonorants), but the latter is also a feature of most other Spanish dialects. In the Peruvian variant, it is palatalized before /i/.
- In Bolivia, Ecuador, and southern Peru, /ʎ/ and /ʝ/ do not merge (lack of yeísmo). In northern Ecuador, /ʎ/ tends to be pronounced as a [ʒ]. However, yeísmo is on the rise among Ecuador's middle and upper classes.
- Often the vowels /e/ and /i/ or /o/ and /u/ are merged because of the influence of the three-vowel system of Quechua and Aymara.
- /r/ and /ɾ/ are assibilated to [r̝] and [ɾ̞], respectively. This is in decline among the middle and upper classes.
- /x/ is velar [x] rather than glottal [h].
- /f/ is realised as bilabial [ɸ], sometimes with an epenthetic /w/ following.
- Emphasis is given to the consonants but the vowels are weakened, especially for unstressed syllables (like in Mexican Spanish).
- The intonation patterns of some Andean accents, such as those of Cusco, have been influenced by those of Quechua. Even monolingual Spanish speakers can show Quechua influence in their intonation.

== Syntax and morphology ==
Voseo is common in the Bolivian and Ecuadorian Andes, largely among rural and poorer speakers. It is nearly extinct in Peru. Some speakers tend towards pronominal voseo, using vos with the tú conjugations of verbs, whereas more indigenous speakers tend to use the vos conjugations.

Words like pues, pero and nomás are often used similarly to the modal suffixes of Quechua and Aymara. They can be stacked at the end of a clause:

Dile nomás pues pero. "Just go ahead and tell him."

Andean Spanish also widely uses redundant "double possessives" as in:

De María en su casa estoy yendo. "I'm going to Maria's house."

This also shows how en can indicate "motion towards" in the Andes. En may also be used "before a locative adverb, as in Vivo en acá 'I live here' or En allá sale agua 'Water is coming out there.'"

Due to Aymara and Quechua influence, Andean Spanish often uses the pluperfect tense or clause-final dice "he/she says" to indicate evidentiality. Evidential dice is more common in monolingual Peruvian Spanish.

In upper Ecuador, a type of construction with dar + gerund is common, ie:

Pedro me dio componiendo mi reloj. "Pedro fixed my watch."

== Vocabulary ==
Andean Spanish typically uses more loans from Aymara and Quechua than other Spanish varieties. In addition, some common words have different meanings. Pie, meaning "foot," can refer to the whole leg, due to Aymara influence. Siempre ("always") can mean "still."

== Bibliography ==
- Alonso, Amado (1967). De la pronunciación medieval a la moderna en español (in Spanish).
- Cotton, Eleanor Greet; Sharp, John (1988), Spanish in the Americas, Georgetown University Press, ISBN 978-0-87840-094-2
- Klee, Carol A.; Lynch, Andrew (2009). El español en contacto con otras lenguas. Washington, D.C.: Georgetown University Press. ISBN 9781589012653.
- Lipski, John (1994). Latin American Spanish. New York: Longman Publishing.
