= Grammatical gender in Spanish =

Feature of Spanish

In Spanish, grammatical gender is a linguistic feature that affects different types of words and how they agree with each other. It applies to nouns, adjectives, determiners, and pronouns. Every Spanish noun has a specific gender, either masculine or feminine, in the context of a sentence. Generally, nouns referring to males or male animals are masculine, while those referring to females are feminine. In terms of importance, the masculine gender is the default or unmarked, while the feminine gender is marked or distinct.

Many gender-related features are common across Romance languages. However, Spanish differs from other Romance languages, like French and Italian, in its kinship terms. For instance, the Spanish words for "uncle" and "aunt" are tío and tía respectively, while in French, they are oncle and tante. Similarly, the Spanish words for "brother" and "sister" are hermano and hermana, whereas in Italian, they are fratello and sorella.

Another unique aspect of Spanish is that personal pronouns have distinct feminine forms for the first and second person plural. For example, the Spanish pronouns nosotras and vosotras specifically refer to groups of females, distinguishing them from the masculine forms used for mixed-gender or male groups.

== Classification ==
The most common genders are called masculine and feminine, while some Spanish pronouns are considered to have neutral gender. A few nouns are said to be of "ambiguous" gender, meaning that they are sometimes treated as masculine and sometimes as feminine. Additionally, the terms "common gender" and "epicene gender" are used to classify ways in which grammatical gender interacts (or not) with "natural gender" (the gender identity of a person, or the sex of an animal). Adjectives ending in -o are almost always masculine, and they always have a feminine counterpart ending in -a; a number of adjectives ending in -a, such as those ending in -ista, are both masculine and feminine.

=== Masculine ===
The masculine (masculino): As a general rule, nouns ending in -o (libro 'book', zapato 'shoe') and nouns which refer to males (profesor 'professor', padre 'father, parent', hombre, 'man, husband') are masculine. Exceptionally, mano ('hand') is feminine. Also some colloquial shortened forms of feminine nouns end with -o: la foto(grafía) ('photograph'), la disco(teca) ('discothèque'), la moto(cicleta) ('motorcycle'), la radio(difusión) ('radio [broadcasting]').

=== Feminine ===
The feminine (femenino): As a general rule, nouns ending in -a (casa 'house', boca 'mouth') and nouns which refer to females (madre 'mother', mujer 'woman, wife') are feminine. Similarly, the endings -ción, -sión, -dad, -tad, -tud, -sis, -tis, and -umbre indicate feminine gender. Exceptionally, día ('day'), mapa ('map') and sofá ('sofa') are masculine. Likewise, nouns of Greek origin ending in -ma (drama 'play', problema 'problem') or -ta (planeta 'planet', profeta 'prophet') are masculine. (These "Greek" nouns can often be identified by their derived adjectives ending in -tico.)

=== Common ===
"Common gender" (común) is the term applied to those nouns, referring to persons, that keep the same form regardless of the sex of the person, but which change their grammatical gender. For example, el violinista ('the male violinist'), la violinista ('the female violinist'), el mártir ('the male martyr'), la mártir ('the female martyr'), el testigo ('the male witness'), la testigo ('the female witness'), el espía ('the male spy'), la espía ('the female spy'), etc. To this gender belong present participles derived from active verbs and used as nouns, such as el estudiante ('the male student'), la estudiante ('the female student'), el atacante ('the male attacker'), la atacante ('the female attacker'), el presidente ('the male president'), la presidente ('the female president'—although la presidenta is also often used), etc.

=== Epicene ===
"Epicene gender" (epiceno) is the term applied to those nouns that have only one grammatical gender, masculine or feminine, but can refer to a living creature of either sex. Most animal names are of this type. E.g.: el ratón ('mouse'), la rata ('rat'), la rana ('frog'), la comadreja ('weasel'), la liebre ('hare'), la hormiga ('ant'), el búho ('owl'), el escarabajo ('beetle'), el buitre ('vulture'), el delfín ('dolphin'), el cóndor ('condor'), la paloma ('dove'), la llama ('llama'). To specify sex, a modifying word is added, with no change of gender: el delfín macho ('the male dolphin'), el delfín hembra ('the female dolphin'), la comadreja macho, la comadreja hembra (male and female weasels respectively).

=== Ambiguous ===
Ambiguous nouns (ambiguo) whose grammatical gender varies in usage are said to be of "ambiguous" gender. Often the change of gender brings about a change of connotation. E.g.: el mar ('the sea'), la mar ('the sea', poetic or among sailors), el calor ('heat'), la calor (regional), el azúcar, la azúcar ('sugar'). In Portuguese this phenomenon is called gênero vacilante ("vacillant gender").

=== Neutral ===
Spanish, like most other Romance languages, is generally regarded to have two genders, but its ancestor, Latin, had three. The transition from three genders to two is mostly complete; however, vestiges of a neuter gender can still be seen. This was noted by Andrés Bello in his work on the grammar of Latin American Spanish.

The pronoun ello ('it, the aforementioned concept'), the demonstrative pronouns esto ('this [idea or unnamed thing]'), eso ('that' not far), and aquello ('that' further away), and some uses of the clitic object pronoun lo, are traditionally called "neuter" ("neutro") because they do not have a gendered noun as their antecedent, but rather refer to a whole idea, a clause, or an object that has not been named in the discourse.

Similarly, the article lo (not to be confused with the object pronoun lo) is not used with nouns, but rather with adjectives to create abstract nominal phrases: lo bueno, the good part (of it); lo importante, what is important (about it); lo mismo, the same. It's also combined with the relative pronouns que and cual to form relative clauses, such as lo que dices, lo cual es cierto, and can also be followed by de, e.g. lo de Juan está aquí, lo de que estoy enfermo no es cierto.

Bello also notes that words such as nada, poco, algo, and mucho can be used as neuters in some contexts.

Neuter forms such as esto were preserved because unlike most nouns in Latin, the difference between masculine and neuter for these pronouns did not depend on a final consonant. For example, most second declension Latin neuter singulars in the nominative case ended in -um, the non-neuter counterpart often ending in -us. When the final consonants in these endings are dropped, the result is -u for both; this became -o in Spanish. However, a word like Latin iste had the neuter istud; the former became este and the latter became esto in Spanish.

Another sign that Spanish once had a grammatical neuter exists in words that derive from neuter plurals. In Latin, a neuter plural ended in -a, and so these words today in Spanish are interpreted as feminine singulars and take singular verb forms; however, they do express some notion of a plural.

== Recent developments ==
Some feminist movements and ideologies have criticized certain grammatical rules in Spanish which use grammatically masculine forms rather than grammatically feminine forms. These include the grammatical custom (inherited from Latin) of using a grammatically masculine plural for a group containing at least one male; the use of the masculine definite article for infinitives (e.g. el amar, not la amar); and the permissibility of using Spanish male pronouns for female referents but not vice versa (e.g. el que includes women, la que does not include men). There also exist solely-masculine apocope forms (e.g. al ("to him", from a + el), del ("of him", from de + el), algún (from alguno) and buen (from bueno)) simply due to inherited tendencies in phonology and morphology. Some early proposals for gender neutrality in Spanish have included extending the use of the gender-neutral -es ending for plural nouns, so that mis hijos ("my children") becomes mis hijes if they are of more than one gender, or non-binary).

On the contrary, some proposals related to grammatical gender may seem to interfere with neutrality. For instance, monoparental is a neologism formed from mono- ("one") and the Latin parentalis (Spanish pariente means "relative", English parent is progenitor or progenitora) to mean "single-parent". It has been occasionally analyzed as too similar to padre ("father"), causing the coining of "monomarental" to mean "single-mother".
