= Spanish language =

Romance language

Spanish
- Castilian
- español; castellano
- Pronunciation: [espaˈɲol] [kasteˈʎano] (pron. with yeísmo: [kasteˈʝano])
- Native to: Spain, Hispanic America, Equatorial Guinea
- Speakers: L1: 519 million (2025); L2: 117 million (2025); Total: 636 million (2025)
- Language family: Indo-European: Italic; Latino-Faliscan; Latin; Romance; Italo-Western; Western Romance; Gallo-Iberian?; Ibero-Romance; West Iberian; Castilian; Spanish
- Early forms: Vulgar Latin: Proto-Romance; Old Spanish; Early Modern Spanish
- Writing system: Latin script (Spanish alphabet); Spanish Braille
- Signed forms: Signed Spanish (using signs of the local language)

Official status
- Official language in: 21 countries, 1 dependent territory, and 1 partially recognized country; Organizations including the AU, CAN, ACS, CARICOM, CELAC, EU, ALADI, Parlatino, Mercosur, OSCE, OAS, UN, USAN, OEI and WTO
- Regulated by: Association of Spanish Language Academies

Language codes
- ISO 639-1: es
- ISO 639-2: spa
- ISO 639-3: spa
- Glottolog: stan1288
- Linguasphere: 51-AAA-b
- Official majority language Co-official or administrative language but not majority native language Secondary language (more than 20% Spanish speakers) or culturally important

Spanish (español), also known as Castilian (castellano), is a Romance language from the Indo-European language family. It evolved from the Vulgar Latin spoken on Europe's Iberian Peninsula, originating in the Kingdom of Castile in what is now north-central Spain. Today, it is a global language with 519 million native speakers, mainly in the Americas and Spain, and about 636 million speakers total, including second-language speakers. Spanish is the official language of 21 countries, as well as one of the six official languages of the United Nations. Spanish is the world's second-most spoken native language after Mandarin Chinese; the world's fourth-most spoken language overall after English, Mandarin Chinese, and Hindustani (Hindi-Urdu); and the world's most widely spoken Romance language. The country with the largest population of native speakers is Mexico, with about 130 million speakers.

Spanish is part of the Ibero-Romance language group, which evolved from several dialects of Vulgar Latin in Iberia after the collapse of the Western Roman Empire in the 5th century. The oldest Latin texts with traces of Spanish come from mid-northern Iberia in the 9th century, and the first systematic written use of the language happened in Toledo, a prominent city of the Kingdom of Castile, in the 13th century. Spanish colonialism in the early modern period spurred the introduction of the language to overseas locations, most notably to the Americas.

As a Romance language, Spanish is a descendant of Latin. About 75% of modern Spanish vocabulary is Latin in origin, including Latin borrowings from Ancient Greek. Alongside English and French, it is also one of the most taught foreign languages throughout the world. Spanish is well represented in the humanities and social sciences. Spanish is also the third most used language on the internet by number of users after English and Chinese and the second most used language by number of websites after English.

Spanish is used as an official language by many international organizations, including the United Nations, European Union, Organization of Ibero-American States, Organization of American States, Union of South American Nations, Community of Latin American and Caribbean States, African Union, and others.

== Name of the language and etymology ==
=== Name of the language ===
In Spain and some other parts of the Spanish-speaking world, Spanish is called not only español but also castellano (Castilian), the language from the Kingdom of Castile, contrasting it with other languages spoken in Spain such as Galician, Basque, Asturian, Catalan/Valencian, Aragonese, Occitan and other minor languages.

The Spanish Constitution of 1978 uses the term castellano to define the official language of the whole of Spain, in contrast to las demás lenguas españolas (lit. 'the other Spanish languages'). Article III reads as follows:

El castellano es la lengua española oficial del Estado. ... Las demás lenguas españolas serán también oficiales en las respectivas Comunidades Autónomas...

Castilian is the official Spanish language of the State. ... The other Spanish languages shall also be official in their respective Autonomous Communities...

The Royal Spanish Academy (Real Academia Española), on the other hand, currently uses the term español in its publications. However, from 1713 to 1923, it called the language castellano.

The Diccionario panhispánico de dudas (a language guide published by the Royal Spanish Academy) states that, although the Royal Spanish Academy prefers to use the term español in its publications when referring to the Spanish language, both terms—español and castellano—are regarded as synonymous and equally valid.

=== Etymology ===
The term castellano is related to Castile (Castilla or archaically Castiella), the kingdom where the language was originally spoken. The name Castile, in turn, is usually assumed to be derived from castillo ('castle').

In the Middle Ages, the language spoken in Castile was generically referred to as Romance and later also as Lengua vulgar. Later in the period, it gained geographical specification as Romance castellano (romanz castellano, romanz de Castiella), lenguaje de Castiella, and ultimately simply as castellano (noun).

Different etymologies have been suggested for the term español (Spanish). According to the Royal Spanish Academy, español derives from the Occitan word espaignol and that, in turn, derives from the Vulgar Latin *hispaniolus ('of Hispania'). Hispania was the Roman name for the entire Iberian Peninsula.

There are other hypotheses apart from the one suggested by the Royal Spanish Academy. Spanish philologist Ramón Menéndez Pidal suggested that the classic hispanus or hispanicus took the suffix -one from Vulgar Latin, as happened with other words such as bretón (Breton) or sajón (Saxon).

== History ==
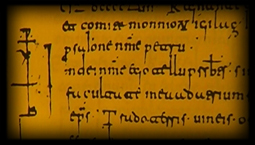
The Cartularies of Valpuesta, written in a late form of Latin, were declared in 2010 by the Royal Spanish Academy as the record of the earliest words written in Castilian, predating those of the Glosas Emilianenses.

Like the other Romance languages, the Spanish language evolved from Vulgar Latin, which was brought to the Iberian Peninsula by the Romans during the Second Punic War, beginning in 210 BC. Several pre-Roman languages (also called Paleohispanic languages)—some distantly related to Latin as Indo-European languages, and some that are not related at all—were previously spoken in the Iberian Peninsula. These languages included Proto-Basque, Iberian, Lusitanian, Celtiberian and Gallaecian.

The first documents to show traces of what is today regarded as the precursor of modern Spanish are from the 9th century. Throughout the Middle Ages and into the modern era, the most important influences on the Spanish lexicon came from neighboring Romance languages—Mozarabic (Andalusi Romance), Navarro-Aragonese, Leonese, Catalan/Valencian, Portuguese, Galician, Occitan, and later, French and Italian. Spanish also borrowed a considerable number of words from Andalusi Arabic, and a few from Basque. In addition, many more words were borrowed from Latin through the influence of written language and the liturgical language of the Church. The loanwords were taken from both Classical Latin and Renaissance Latin, the form of Latin in use at that time.

According to the theories of Ramón Menéndez Pidal, local sociolects of Vulgar Latin evolved into Spanish, in the north of Iberia, in an area centered in the city of Burgos, and this dialect was later brought to the city of Toledo, where the written standard of Spanish was first developed, in the 13th century. In this formative stage, Spanish developed a strongly differing variant from its close cousin, Leonese, and, according to some authors, was distinguished by a heavy Basque influence (see Iberian Romance languages). This distinctive dialect spread to southern Spain with the advance of the Reconquista, and meanwhile gathered a sizable lexical influence from the Arabic of Al-Andalus, much of it indirectly, through the Romance Mozarabic dialects (some 4,000 Arabic-derived words, make up about 8% of the language today). The written standard for this new language was developed in the cities of Toledo, in the 13th to 16th centuries, and Madrid, from the 1570s.

The development of the Spanish sound system from that of Vulgar Latin exhibits most of the changes that are typical of Western Romance languages, including lenition of intervocalic consonants (thus Latin vīta > Spanish vida). The diphthongization of Latin stressed short e and o—which occurred in open syllables in French and Italian, but not at all in Catalan or Portuguese—is found in both open and closed syllables in Spanish, as shown in the following table:

Latin	Spanish	Ladino	Aragonese	Asturian	Galician	Portuguese	Catalan	Gascon / Occitan	French	Sardinian	Italian	Romanian	English
petra	piedra				pedra			pedra, pèira	pierre	pedra, perda	pietra	piatră	'stone'
terra	tierra				terra			tèrra	terre	terra		țară	'land'
moritur	muere			muerre	morre		mor	morís	meurt	mòrit	muore	moare	'dies (v.)'
mortem	muerte				morte		mort	mòrt	mort	morte, morti	morte	moarte	'death'

Chronological map showing linguistic evolution in southwest Europe

Spanish is marked by palatalization of the Latin double consonants (geminates) nn and ll (thus Latin annum > Spanish año, and Latin anellum > Spanish anillo).

The consonant written u or v in Latin and pronounced [w] in Classical Latin had probably "fortified" to a bilabial fricative /β/ in Vulgar Latin. In early Spanish (but not in Catalan or Portuguese) it merged with the consonant written b (a bilabial with plosive and fricative allophones). In modern Spanish, there is no difference between the pronunciation of orthographic b and v.

Typical of Spanish (as also of neighboring Gascon extending as far north as the Gironde estuary, and found in a small area of Calabria), attributed by some scholars to a Basque substratum was the mutation of Latin initial f into h- whenever it was followed by a vowel that did not diphthongize. The h-, still preserved in spelling, is now silent in most varieties of the language, although in some Andalusian and Caribbean dialects, it is still aspirated in some words. Because of borrowings from Latin and neighboring Romance languages, there are many f-/h- doublets in modern Spanish: Fernando and Hernando (both Spanish for "Ferdinand"), ferrero and herrero (both Spanish for "smith"), fierro and hierro (both Spanish for "iron"), and fondo and hondo (both words pertaining to depth in Spanish, though fondo means "bottom", while hondo means "deep"); additionally, hacer ("to make") is cognate to the root word of satisfacer ("to satisfy"), and hecho ("made") is similarly cognate to the root word of satisfecho ("satisfied").

Compare the examples in the following table:

Latin	Spanish	Ladino	Aragonese	Asturian	Galician	Portuguese	Catalan	Gascon / Occitan	French	Sardinian	Italian	Romanian	English
filium	hijo	fijo (or hijo)	fillo	fíu	fillo	filho	fill	filh, hilh	fils	fizu, fìgiu, fillu	figlio	fiu	'son'
facere	hacer	fazer	fer	facer		fazer	fer	far, faire, har (or hèr)	faire	fàghere, fàere, fàiri	fare	a face	'to do'
febrem	fiebre (calentura)				febre			fèbre, frèbe, hrèbe (or herèbe)	fièvre	calentura	febbre	febră	'fever'
focum	fuego			fueu	fogo		foc	fuòc, fòc, huèc	feu	fogu	fuoco	foc	'fire'

Some consonant clusters of Latin also produced characteristically different results in these languages, as shown in the examples in the following table:

Latin	Spanish	Ladino	Aragonese	Asturian	Galician	Portuguese	Catalan	Gascon / Occitan	French	Sardinian	Italian	Romanian	English
clāvem	llave	clave	clau	llave	chave	chave	clau		clé	giae, crae, crai	chiave	cheie	'key'
flamma	llama	flama		chama	chama, flama		flama		flamme	framma	fiamma	flamă	'flame'
plēnum	lleno	pleno	plen	llenu	cheo	cheio, pleno	ple	plen	plein	prenu	pieno	plin	'plenty, full'
octō	ocho		güeito	ocho, oito	oito	oito (oito)	vuit, huit	uèch, uòch, uèit	huit	oto	otto	opt	'eight'
multum	mucho muy	muncho muy	muito mui	munchu mui	moito moi	muito	molt	molt (arch.)	très, beaucoup, moult	meda	molto	mult	'much, very, many'

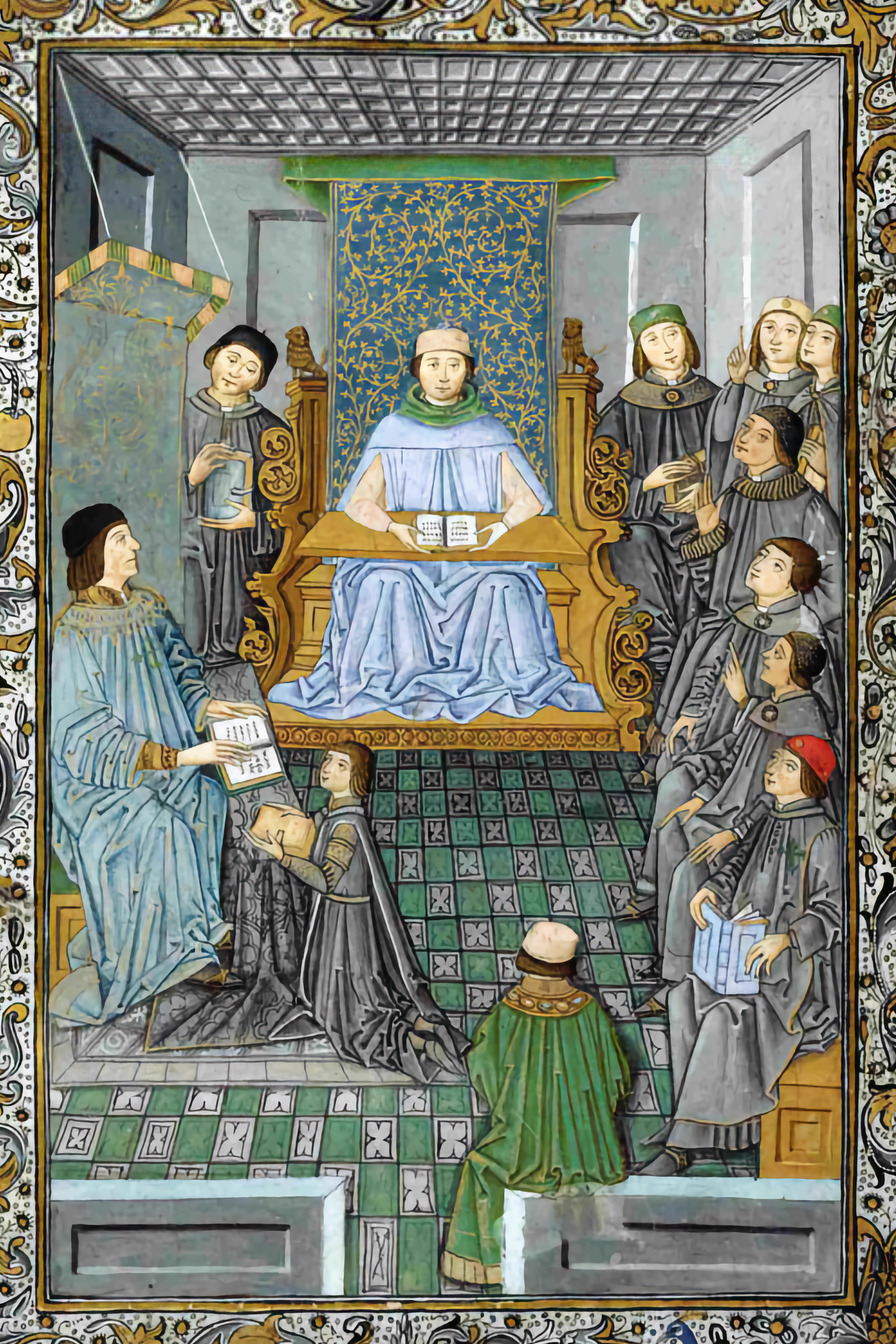
Antonio de Nebrija, author of Gramática de la lengua castellana, the first grammar of a modern European language

In the 15th and 16th centuries, Spanish underwent a dramatic change in the pronunciation of its sibilant consonants, known in Spanish as the reajuste de las sibilantes, which resulted in the distinctive velar [x] pronunciation of the letter ⟨j⟩ and—in a large part of Spain—the characteristic interdental [θ] ("th-sound") for the letter ⟨z⟩ (and for ⟨c⟩ before ⟨e⟩ or ⟨i⟩). See History of Spanish (Modern development of the Old Spanish sibilants) for details.

The Gramática de la lengua castellana, written in Salamanca in 1492 by Elio Antonio de Nebrija, was the first grammar written for a modern European language. According to a popular anecdote, when Nebrija presented it to Queen Isabella I, she asked him what was the use of such a work, and he answered that language is the instrument of empire. In his introduction to the grammar, dated 18 August 1492, Nebrija wrote that "... language was always the companion of empire."

From the 16th century onwards, the language was taken to the Spanish-discovered America and the Spanish East Indies via Spanish colonization of America. Miguel de Cervantes, author of Don Quixote, is such a well-known reference in the world that Spanish is often called la lengua de Cervantes ("the language of Cervantes").

In the 20th century, Spanish was introduced to Equatorial Guinea and the Western Sahara, and to areas of the United States that had not been part of the Spanish Empire, such as Spanish Harlem in New York City. For details on borrowed words and other external influences upon Spanish, see Influences on the Spanish language.

== Geographical distribution ==
Spanish is the primary language in 20 countries worldwide. As of 2025, it is estimated that about 519 million people speak Spanish as a native language, making it the second most spoken language by number of native speakers. An additional 117 million speak Spanish as a second or foreign language, making it the fourth most spoken language in the world overall after English, Mandarin Chinese, and Hindi with a total number of 636 million speakers. Spanish is also the third most used language on the Internet, after English and Chinese.

=== Europe ===
Percentage of people who self reportedly know enough Spanish to hold a conversation, in the EU, 2005 Native country More than 8.99% Between 4% and 8.99% Between 1% and 3.99% Less than 1%

Spanish is the official language of Spain. Upon the emergence of the Castilian Crown as the dominant power in the Iberian Peninsula by the end of the Middle Ages, the Romance vernacular associated with this polity became increasingly used in instances of prestige and influence, and the distinction between "Castilian" and "Spanish" started to become blurred. Hard policies imposing the language's hegemony in an intensely centralising Spanish state were established from the 18th century onward.

Other European territories in which it is also widely spoken include Gibraltar and Andorra.

Spanish is also spoken by immigrant communities in other European countries, such as the United Kingdom, France, Italy, and Germany. Spanish is the most widely studied Romance language in Europe. According to Eurostat data, about 27% of secondary school students in the European Union study Spanish, making it the second most taught foreign language after English and the most studied Romance language on the continent. Spanish is an official language of the European Union.

=== Americas ===
==== Hispanic America ====
Today, the majority of the Spanish speakers live in Hispanic America. Nationally, Spanish is the official language—either de facto or de jure—of Argentina, Bolivia (co-official with 36 indigenous languages), Chile, Colombia, Costa Rica, Cuba, Dominican Republic, Ecuador, El Salvador, Guatemala, Honduras, Mexico (co-official with 63 indigenous languages), Nicaragua, Panama, Paraguay (co-official with Guaraní), Peru (co-official with Quechua, Aymara, and "the other indigenous languages"), Puerto Rico (co-official with English), Uruguay, and Venezuela.

==== United States ====
Percentage of the U.S. population aged 5 and over who speaks Spanish at home in 2019, by states

The Spanish language has a long history in the territory of the current-day United States dating back to the 16th century. In the wake of the 1848 Guadalupe Hidalgo Treaty, hundreds of thousands of Spanish speakers became a minoritized community in the United States. The 20th century saw further massive growth of Spanish speakers in areas where they had been hitherto scarce.

According to the 2020 census, over 60 million people of the U.S. population were of Hispanic or Hispanic American by origin. In turn, 41.8 million people in the United States aged five or older speak Spanish at home, or about 13% of the population. Spanish predominates in the unincorporated territory of Puerto Rico, where it is also an official language along with English.

Spanish is by far the most common second language in the country, with over 50 million total speakers if non-native or second-language speakers are included. While English is the de facto national language of the country, Spanish is often used in public services and notices at the federal and state levels. Spanish is also used in administration in the state of New Mexico. The language has a strong influence in major metropolitan areas such as those of Los Angeles, San Diego, Miami, San Antonio, New York, San Francisco, Dallas, Tucson and Phoenix of the Arizona Sun Corridor, as well as more recently, Chicago, Las Vegas, Boston, Denver, Houston, Indianapolis, Oklahoma City, Philadelphia, Cleveland, Salt Lake City, Atlanta, Nashville, Orlando, Tampa, Raleigh and Baltimore-Washington, D.C. due to 20th- and 21st-century immigration.

==== Rest of the Americas ====
Although Spanish has no official recognition in the former British colony of Belize (known until 1973 as British Honduras) where English is the sole official language, according to the 2022 census, 54% of the total population are able to speak the language.

Due to its proximity to Spanish-speaking countries and small existing native Spanish speaking minority, Trinidad and Tobago has implemented Spanish language teaching into its education system. The Trinidadian and Tobagonian government launched the Spanish as a First Foreign Language (SAFFL) initiative in March 2005.

Spanish has historically had a significant presence on the Dutch Caribbean islands of Aruba, Bonaire and Curaçao (ABC Islands) throughout the centuries and in present times. The majority of the populations of each island (especially Aruba) speak Spanish at varying although often high degrees of fluency. The local language Papiamentu (or Papiamento in Aruba) is heavily influenced by Venezuelan Spanish.

In addition to sharing most of its borders with Spanish-speaking countries, the creation of Mercosur in the early 1990s induced a favorable situation for the promotion of Spanish language teaching in Brazil. In 2005, the National Congress of Brazil approved a bill, signed into law by the President, making it mandatory for schools to offer Spanish as an alternative foreign language course in both public and private secondary schools in Brazil. In September 2016 this law was revoked by Michel Temer after the impeachment of Dilma Rousseff. In many border towns and villages along Paraguay and Uruguay, a mixed language known as Portuñol is spoken.

=== Africa ===
==== Sub-Saharan Africa ====
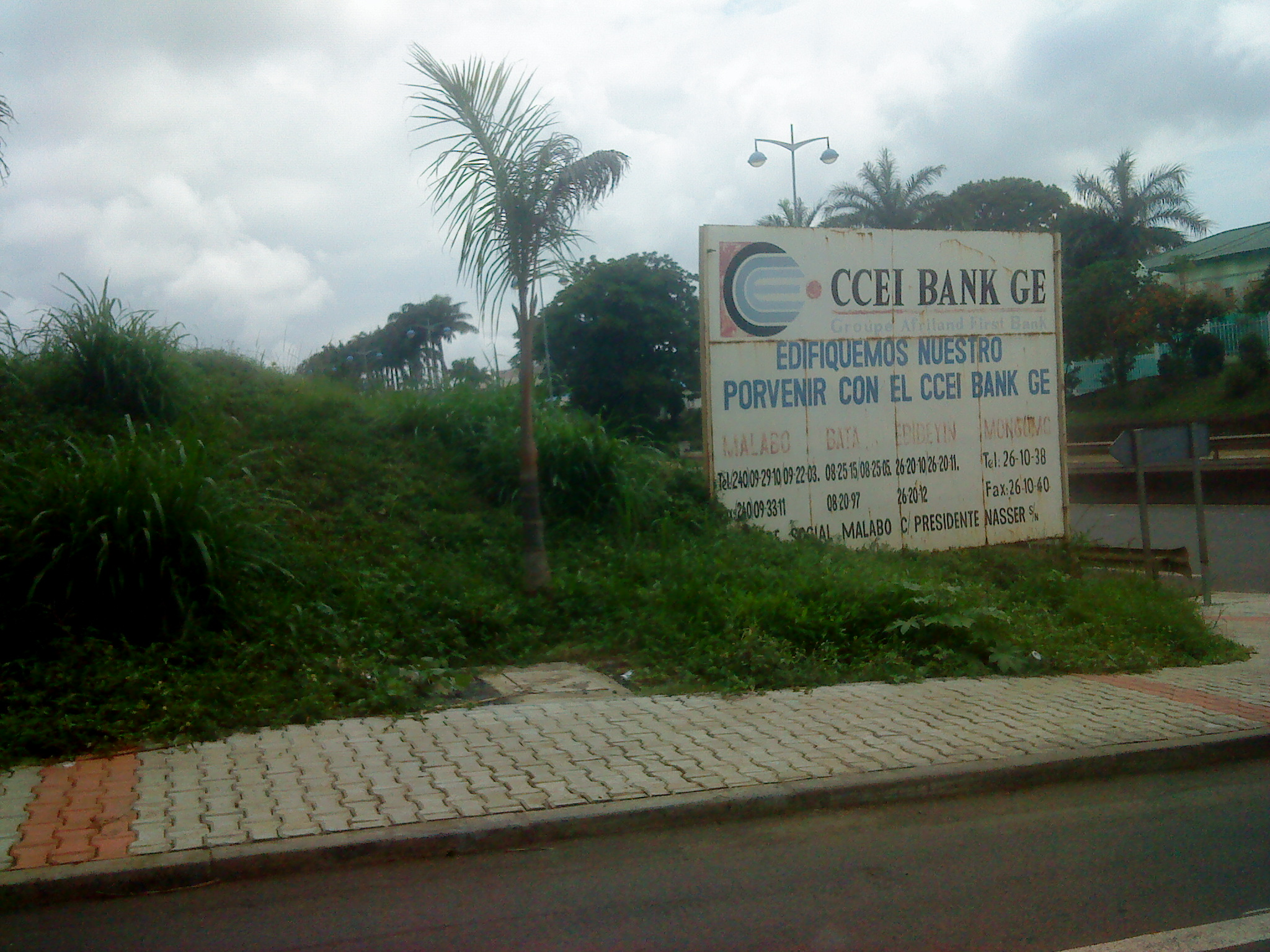
Spanish language signage in Malabo, Equatorial Guinea

Equatorial Guinea is the only Spanish-speaking country located entirely in Africa, with the language introduced during the Spanish colonial period. Enshrined in the constitution as an official language (alongside French and Portuguese), Spanish features prominently in the Equatoguinean education system and is the primary language used in government and business. Spanish is spoken as a native language by a small minority in Equatorial Guinea, primarily in larger cities. The Instituto Cervantes estimates that 87.7% of the population is fluent in Spanish. The proportion of proficient Spanish speakers in Equatorial Guinea exceeds the proportion of proficient speakers in other West and Central African nations of their respective colonial languages.

Spanish is spoken by very small communities in Angola due to Cuban influence from the Cold War and in South Sudan among South Sudanese natives that relocated to Cuba during the Sudanese wars and returned for their country's independence.

==== North Africa and Macaronesia ====
Spanish is also spoken in the integral territories of Spain in Africa, namely the cities of Ceuta and Melilla and the Canary Islands, located in the Atlantic Ocean some 100 km (62 mi) off the northwest of the African mainland. The Spanish spoken in the Canary Islands traces its origins back to the Castilian conquest in the 15th century, and, in addition to a resemblance to Western Andalusian speech patterns, it also features strong influence from the Spanish varieties spoken in the Americas, which in turn have also been influenced historically by Canarian Spanish. The Spanish spoken in North Africa by native bilingual speakers of Arabic or Berber who also speak Spanish as a second language features characteristics involving the variability of the vowel system.

While far from its heyday during the Spanish protectorate in Morocco, the Spanish language has some presence in northern Morocco, stemming for example from the availability of certain Spanish-language media. According to a 2012 survey by Morocco's Royal Institute for Strategic Studies (IRES), penetration of Spanish in Morocco reaches 4.6% of the population. Many northern Moroccans have rudimentary knowledge of Spanish, with Spanish being particularly significant in areas adjacent to Ceuta and Melilla. Spanish also has a presence in the education system of the country (through either selected education centers implementing Spain's education system, primarily located in the North, or the availability of Spanish as foreign language subject in secondary education).

In Western Sahara, formerly Spanish Sahara, a primarily Hassaniya Arabic-speaking territory, Spanish was officially spoken as the language of the colonial administration during the late 19th and 20th centuries. Today, Spanish is present in the partially-recognized Sahrawi Arab Democratic Republic as its secondary official language, and in the Sahrawi refugee camps in Tindouf (Algeria), where the Spanish language is still taught as a second language, largely by Cuban educators.

Spanish is also an official language of the African Union.

=== Asia ===
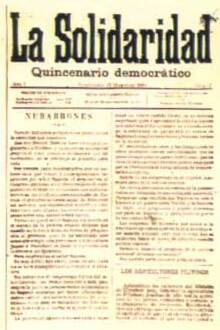
An 1892 issue of La Solidaridad, a Spanish-language newspaper on the colonial Philippines published in Barcelona by Filipino exiles and international students

Spanish was an official language of the Philippines from the beginning of Spanish administration in 1565 to a constitutional change in 1973. During Spanish colonization, it was the language of government, trade, and education, and was spoken as a first language by Spaniards and educated Filipinos (Ilustrados). Despite a public education system set up by the colonial government, by the end of Spanish rule in 1898, only about 10% of the population had knowledge of Spanish, mostly those of Spanish descent or elite standing.

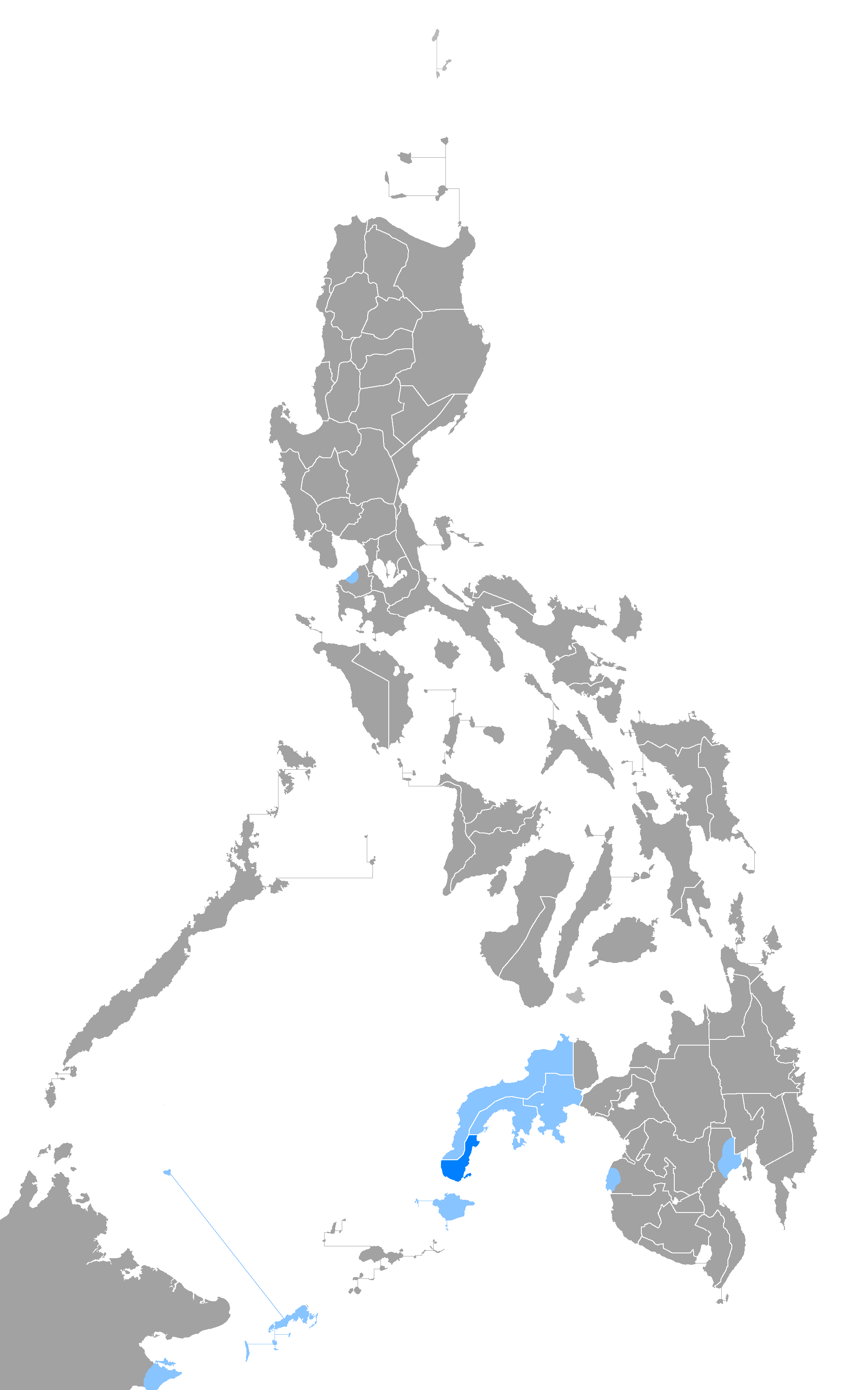
Map of the Chavacano language in various provinces of the Philippines, as well as Sabah in Malaysia (where it is spoken by immigrants)

Spanish continued to be official and used in Philippine literature and press during the early years of American administration after the Spanish–American War but was eventually replaced by English as the primary language of administration and education by the 1920s. Nevertheless, despite a significant decrease in influence and speakers, Spanish remained an official language of the Philippines upon independence in 1946, alongside English and Filipino, a standardized version of Tagalog.

Spanish was briefly removed from official status in 1973 but reimplemented under the administration of Ferdinand Marcos two months later. It remained an official language until the ratification of the present constitution in 1987, in which it was re-designated as a voluntary and optional auxiliary language. Additionally, the constitution, in its Article XIV, stipulates that the government shall provide the people of the Philippines with a Spanish-language translation of the country's constitution. In recent years changing attitudes among non-Spanish speaking Filipinos have helped spur a revival of the language, and starting in 2009 Spanish was reintroduced as part of the basic education curriculum in a number of public high schools, becoming the largest foreign language program offered by the public school system, with over 7,000 students studying the language in the 2021–2022 school year alone. The local business process outsourcing industry has also helped boost the language's economic prospects. Today, while the actual number of proficient Spanish speakers is about 400,000, or under 0.5% of the population, a new generation of Spanish speakers in the Philippines has likewise emerged, though speaker estimates vary widely.

Aside from standard Spanish, a Spanish-based creole language called Chavacano developed in the southern Philippines. However, it is not mutually intelligible with Spanish. The number of Chavacano-speakers was estimated at 1.2 million in 1996. The local languages of the Philippines also retain significant Spanish influence, with many words derived from Mexican Spanish, owing to the administration of the islands by Spain through New Spain until 1821, until direct governance from Madrid afterwards to 1898.

=== Oceania ===
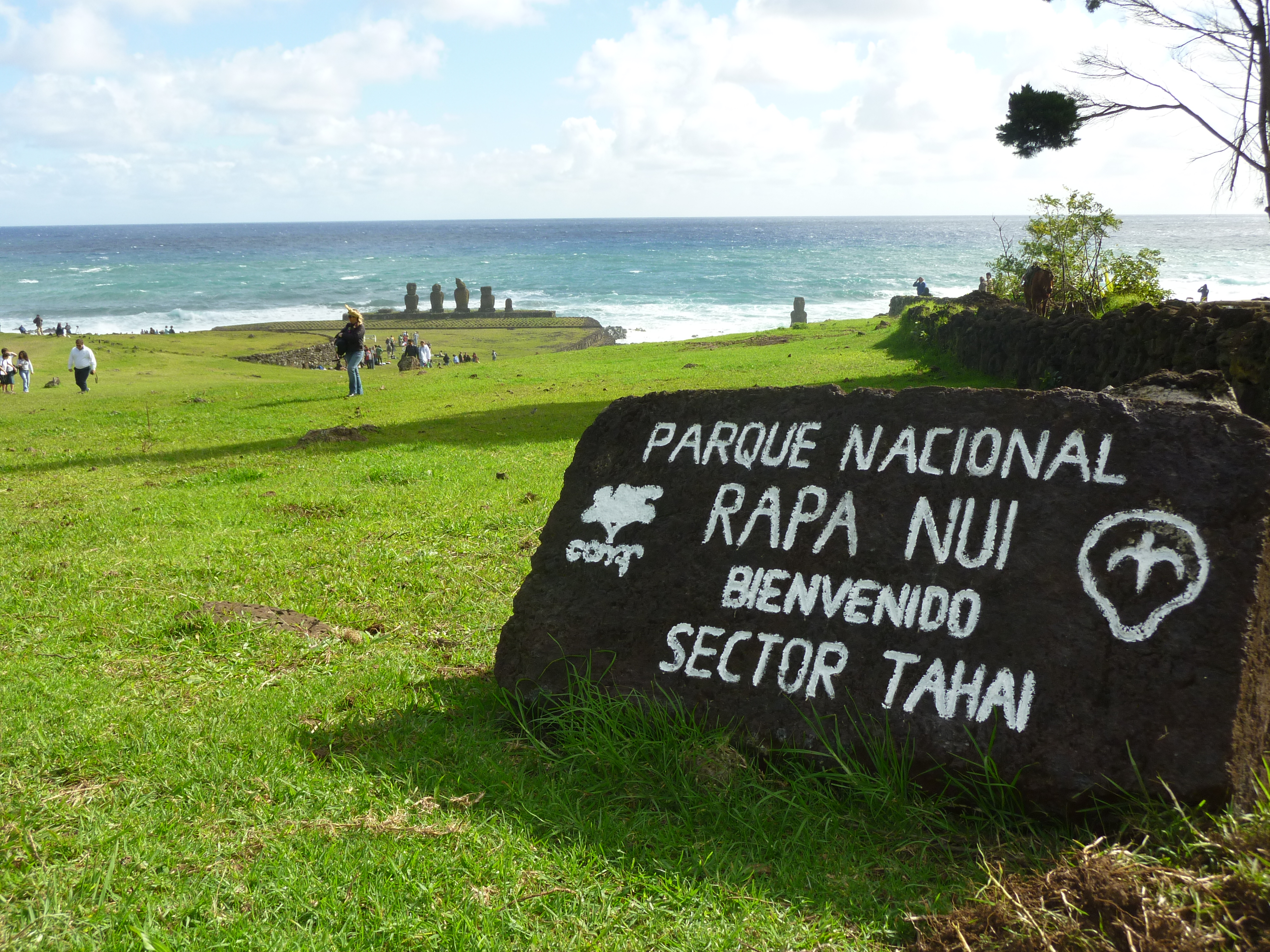
Announcement in Spanish on Easter Island, welcoming visitors to Rapa Nui National Park

Spanish is the official and most spoken language on Easter Island, which is geographically part of Polynesia in Oceania and politically part of Chile. However, Easter Island's traditional language is Rapa Nui, an Eastern Polynesian language.

As a legacy of comprising the former Spanish East Indies, Spanish loan words are present in the local languages of Guam, Northern Mariana Islands, Palau, Marshall Islands and Micronesia.

In addition, in Australia and New Zealand, there are native Spanish communities, resulting from emigration from Spanish-speaking countries (mainly from the Southern Cone).

=== Spanish speakers by country ===
20 countries and one United States territory speak Spanish officially, and the language has a significant unofficial presence in the rest of the United States along with Andorra, Belize and the territory of Gibraltar.

Worldwide Spanish fluency (grey and * signifies official language)
Country	Population	Speakers of Spanish as a native language	Native speakers and proficient speakers as a second language	Total number of Spanish speakers (including limited competence speakers)
Mexico*	133,367,428	125,098,647 (93.8%)	125,632,117 (94.2%)	132,300,489 (99.2%)
United States	340,110,990	44,867,699 (13.9% of 321,745,943)	49,671,936 (15.4% of 321,745,943) (Note: 75% of U.S. Hispanics speak Spanish very well or pretty well (according to a 2022 survey). There were 68,013,553 Hispanics in the U.S. of which 62,879,127 are over 5 years old, as of 2024. 75% of this figure is 47,159,345. There were also another 2,512,591 non-Hispanic Spanish speakers at home older than 5 years old (5.6% of 44,867,699) as of 2024. In 2011, a similar survey tells that 82% of U.S. Hispanics speak Spanish very well or pretty well, and there were another 2.8 million non Hispanics who speak Spanish at home.)	64,867,699 (Note: 44,867,699 as a first language + 20,000,000 (Hispanics with limited proficiency, and part of the 8.9 million Spanish students that they are non-Hispanic). Some of the 11 million undocumented Hispanic immigrants not reflected in the census are not included.) (Note: 90% of U.S. Hispanics know how to speak at least a little Spanish (according to a 2022 survey). There were 68,013,553 Hispanics in the U.S. of which 62,879,127 are over 5 years old, as of 2024. There were also another 2,512,591 non-Hispanic Spanish speakers at home older than 5 years old (5.6% of 44,867,699) as of 2024. Total number of people who speak at least a little Spanish: 59,103,805. To avoid double counting, 7.9 million Spanish students are not included, nor are some of the 7.4 million undocumented Hispanics who may not be reflected in the census).)
Colombia*	53,110,609	52,090,885 (98.1%)		52 962 217 (99.7%) (Note: Indigenous population that does not speak Spanish: 148,392)
Spain*	49,801,559	42,630,135 (85.6%)	47,809,497 (96%)	49,552,551 (99.5%)
Argentina*	47,070,217	45,187,408 (96.0%)	46,458,304 (98.7%)	46,787,796 (99.4%)
Peru*	34,412,393	28,527,874 (82.9%)	29,594,658 (86.6%)	30,600,340 (88.9%) (Note: Indigenous population that does not speak Spanish: 335,576)
Venezuela*	28,460,000	27,720,040 (97.4%)		28,240,466 (99.2%) (Note: Indigenous population that does not speak Spanish: 219,534)
Chile*	20,206,953	19,317,847 (95.6%)		19,945,772 (99.6%) (Note: Indigenous population that does not speak Spanish: 85,869)
Ecuador*	18,243,816	17,094,456 (93.7%)	17,706,264 (97.0%) (Note: People with Spanish limited competence in Ecuador: 537,552. Indigenous population that does not speak Spanish: 451,533)	17,988,403 (98.6%)
Guatemala*	18,312,373	12,800,349 (69.9%)	13,899,091 (75.9%)	16,673,506 (90.8%) (Note: Indigenous population that does not speak Spanish: 1,638,867)
Bolivia*	12,332,252	7,485,677 (60.7%)	9,927,463 (80.5%)	12,064,523 (97.8%) (Note: Indigenous population that does not speak Spanish: 267,729)
Cuba*	11,089,511	10,996,367 (99.2%)		10,996,367 (99.2%)
Dominican Republic*	10,878,267	10,323,475 (94.9%)		10,747,728 (98.8%)
Honduras*	10,039,862	9,549,917 (95.1%)		9,949,503 (99.1%)
France	68,381,000	557,001 (1% of 55 700 114)	1,910,258 (4% of 55 700 114) (Note: 3% of people in France older than 12, speak Spanish very well, and 1% speak Spanish as a native language.)	7,798,016 (14% of 55 700 114)
Brazil	212,584,000	1,350,000		7,329,898 (Note: 1,350,000 immigrants native speakers + 1,931,480 Portuñol speakers in border areas and descendants of immigrants (500,000 to 1 million people) + 4,048,338 Spanish students.)
Nicaragua*	6,803,886	6,484,103 (95.3%)	6,599,769 (97.1%)	6,734,219 (98.9%) (Note: Indigenous population that does not speak Spanish: 69,667)
Paraguay*	6,417,076	3,946,502 (61.5%)	4,318,692 (67.3%)	6,397,823 (99,7%) (Note: Indigenous population that does not speak Spanish: 19,253. Indigenous population that have limited competence: 2,456,048 (page 45, 34 of "Anuario del Instituto Cervantes 2024").)
El Salvador*	6,029,976	6,015,876	6,023,946 (99.9%)	
Germany	83,190,556	716,772 (1% of 71 677 231)	2,150,317 (3% of 71 677 231) (Note: 2% of people in Germany older than 12, speak Spanish very well, and 1% speak Spanish as a native language.)	5,734,178 (8% of 71 677 231)
Costa Rica*	5,327,387	5,268,786 (98.9%)		5,326,600 (99.9%) (Note: Indigenous population that does not speak Spanish: 897)
Panama*	4,565,559	3,944,643 (86.4)		4,495,892 (98.4%) (Note: Indigenous population that does not speak Spanish: 69,667)
Uruguay*	3,499,451	3,348,975 (95.7%)	3,467,956 (99.1%)	
Puerto Rico*	3,203,295	3,049,537 (95.2%)		3,200,092 (99.9%)
United Kingdom	68,265,209	215,062 (0.4%)	518,480 (1% of 51,848,010)	3,110,880 (6% of 51,848,010)
Italy	60,542,215	515,597 (1% of 51,862,391)	1,546,790 (3% of 51,862,391) (Note: 2% of people in Italy older than 12, speak Spanish very well, and 1% speak Spanish as a native language.)	3,093,580 (6% of 51,862,391)
Morocco	36,828,330	136,892		1,888,625 (10%)
Canada	41,465,298	600,795 (1.6%)	1,171,450 (3.2%)	1,775,000
Netherlands	18,070,000			1,328,731 (9% of 14 763 684)
Equatorial Guinea*	1,505,588		1,114,135 (74%)	1,320,401 (87.7%)
Portugal	10,639,726	48,791	178,312 (2% of 8,915,624)	1,089,995
Belgium	11,812,354	96,193 (1% of 9,619,330)	192,387 (2% of 9,619,330) (Note: 1% of people in Belgium older than 12, speak Spanish very well, and 1% speak Spanish as a native language.)	961,933 (10% of 9,619,330)
Sweden	10,588,230	85,415 (1% of 8,541,497)		854,149 (10% of 8,541,497)
Ivory Coast	29,389,150			798,095 (students)
Australia	27,309,396	175,491		559,491
Switzerland	9,060,598	212,970(2.3%)		556,131
Philippines	114,123,600	6,834		554,530
Romania	19,051,562			485,241 (3 of 16,174,719)
Denmark	5,982,117			440,213 (9% of 4,891,261)
Western Sahara	590,506	N/A		423,739
Benin	12,910,087			412,515 (students)
Cameroon	28,758,503			403,000 (students)
Senegal	12,853,259			356,000 (students)
Poland	38,036,118			319,829 (1% of 31,982,941)
Austria	9,198,214		76,471 (1% of 7,647,176)	305,887 (4% of 7,647,176)
Ireland	5,380,300	40,059 (1% of 4,005,909)	120,177 (3% of 4,005,909)	280,414 (7% of 4,005,909)
Belize	430,191	224,130 (52.1%)	224,130 (52.1%)	270,160 (62.8%)
Czech Republic	10,897,237		89,820 (1% of 8,982,036)	269,461 (3% of 8,982,036)
Algeria	47,400,000	1,149		263,428 (Note: There are 1,149 native Spanish speakers + 173,600 Spanish speakers with limited competence + 88,679 Spanish students.)
Curaçao, Sint Maarten, Bonaire, Sint Eustatius & Saba	244,700	46,621		203,339
Finland	5,638,675			186,917 (4% of 4,672,932)
Greece	10,400,720		91,679 (1% of 9,167,896)	183,358 (2% of 9,167,896)
Bulgaria	6,445,481		59,175 (1% of 5,917,534)	177,526 (3% of 5,917,534)
Gabon	2,408,586			167,410 (students)
Hungary	9,540,000		83,135 (1% of 8,313,539)	166,271 (2% of 8,313,539)
Russia	146,028,325	28,924		163,354 (134,430 students)
Japan	123,440,000	131,000		160,000
Slovakia	5,421,272		45,915 (1% of 4,591,487)	91,830 (2% of 4,591,487)
Israel	10,045,100	104,000		149,000
Norway	5,594,340	13,000		132,888 (Note: There are 13,000 native Spanish speakers + 24,000 Spanish speakers with limited competence + 95,888 Spanish students.)
Aruba	107,566	14,737		89,387
Luxembourg	672,050	16,000 (3% of 533,335)	37,000 (7% of 533,335) (Note: 4% of people in Italy older than 12, speak Spanish very well, and 3% speak Spanish as a native language.)	80,000 (15% of 533,335)
Andorra	85,101	34,132 (43.2%)	49,018 (57.6%)	71,677 (80.0%)
Trinidad and Tobago	1,368,333	4,000		70,401
China	1,408,280,000	15,130		69,028 (53,898 students)
New Zealand		22,000		58,373 (36,373 students)
Slovenia			35,194 (2% of 1,759,701)	52,791 (3% of 1,759,701)
India	1,428,627,663	4,855		51,104 (46,249 students)
Guam	153,836	1,309		32,233
Gibraltar	34,003	24,958 (73.4%)		31,725 (93.3 %)
Lithuania	2,972,949			28,297 (1% of 2,829,740)
Turkey	85,664,944	5,460		21,660
Egypt	105,914,499			21,000
US Virgin Islands		16,788	16,788	16,788
Latvia	2,209,000			13,943 (1% of 1,447,866)
Cyprus				2% of 660,400
Estonia				9,457 (1% of 945,733)
Jamaica	2,711,476	8,000	8,000	8,000
Namibia		666	3,866	3,866
Malta				3,354 (1% of 335,476)
Total	8,208,000,000 (total world population)	493,111,513 (6%)	518,032,386 (6.3%)	586,684,915 (7.1%)

== Grammar ==
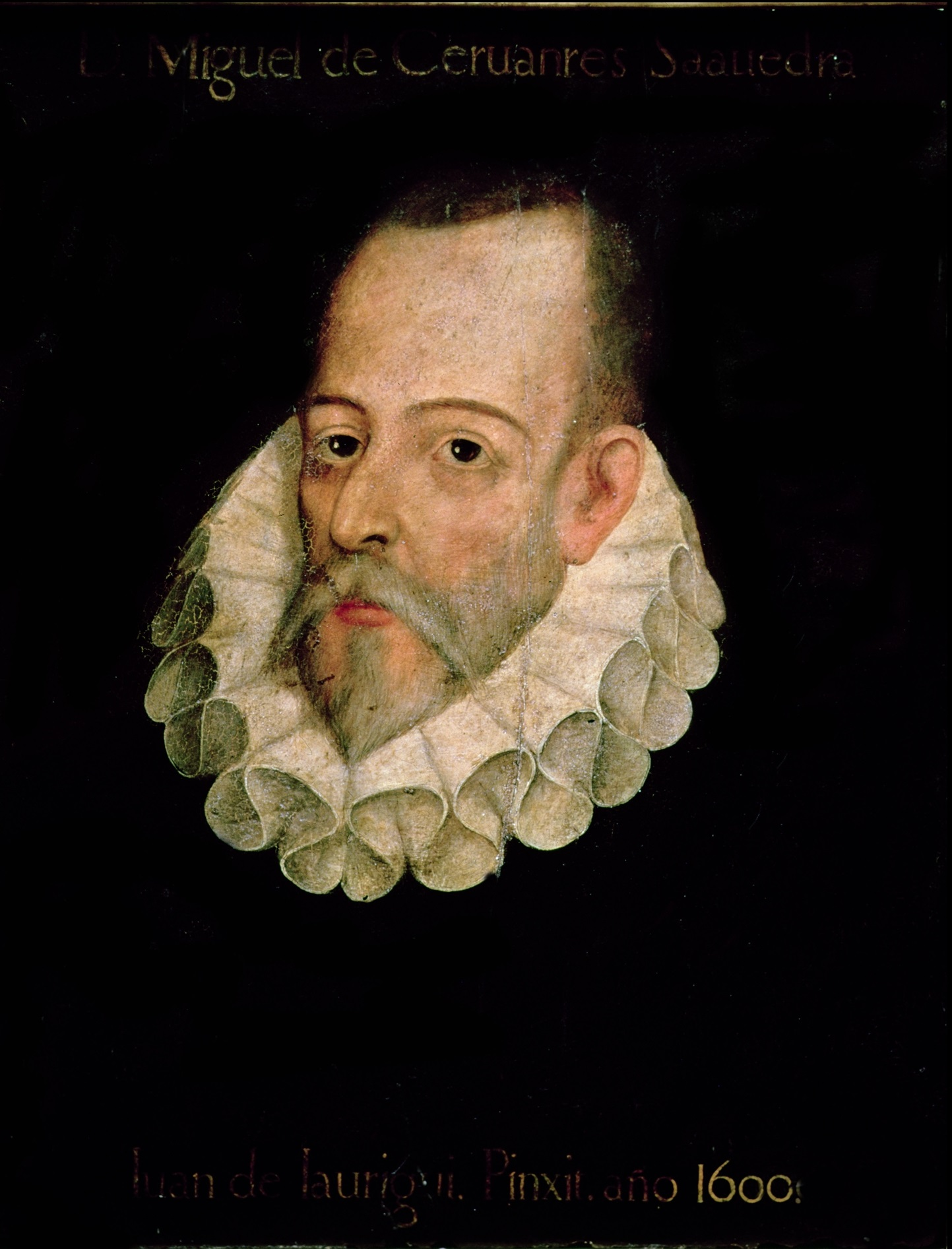
Miguel de Cervantes, considered by many the greatest author of Spanish literature, and author of Don Quixote, widely considered the first modern European novel

Most of the grammatical and typological features of Spanish are shared with the other Romance languages. Spanish is a fusional language. The noun and adjective systems exhibit two genders and two numbers. In addition, articles and some pronouns and determiners have a neuter gender in their singular form. There are about fifty conjugated forms per verb, with 3 tenses: past, present, future; 2 aspects for past: perfective, imperfective; 4 moods: indicative, subjunctive, conditional, imperative; 3 persons: first, second, third; 2 numbers: singular, plural; 3 verboid forms: infinitive, gerund, and past participle. The indicative mood is the unmarked one, while the subjunctive mood expresses uncertainty or indetermination, and is commonly paired with the conditional, which is a mood used to express "would" (as in, "I would eat if I had food"); the imperative is a mood to express a command, commonly a one word phrase – "¡Di!" ("Talk!").

Verbs express T–V distinction by using different persons for formal and informal addresses. (For a detailed overview of verbs, see Spanish verbs and Spanish irregular verbs.)

Spanish syntax is considered right-branching, meaning that subordinate or modifying constituents tend to be placed after head words. The language uses prepositions (rather than postpositions or inflection of nouns for case), and usually—though not always—places adjectives after nouns, as do most other Romance languages.

Spanish is classified as a subject–verb–object language; however, as in most Romance languages, constituent order is highly variable and governed mainly by topicalization and focus. It is a "pro-drop", or "null-subject" language—that is, it allows the deletion of subject pronouns when they are pragmatically unnecessary. Spanish is described as a "verb-framed" language, meaning that the direction of motion is expressed in the verb while the mode of locomotion is expressed adverbially (e.g. subir corriendo or salir volando; the respective English equivalents of these examples—'to run up' and 'to fly out'—show that English is, by contrast, "satellite-framed", with mode of locomotion expressed in the verb and direction in an adverbial modifier).

== Phonology ==
Spanish as spoken in Spain

The Spanish phonological system evolved from that of Vulgar Latin. Its development exhibits some traits in common with other Western Romance languages, others with the neighboring Hispanic varieties—especially Leonese and Aragonese—as well as other features unique to Spanish. Spanish is alone among its immediate neighbors in having undergone frequent aspiration and eventual loss of the Latin initial /f/ sound (e.g. Cast. harina vs. Leon. and Arag. farina). The Latin initial consonant sequences pl-, cl-, and fl- in Spanish typically merge as ll- (originally pronounced [ʎ]), while in Aragonese they are preserved in most dialects, and in Leonese they present a variety of outcomes, including [tʃ], [ʃ], and [ʎ]. Where Latin had -li- before a vowel (e.g. filius) or the ending -iculus, -icula (e.g. auricula), Old Spanish produced [ʒ], that in Modern Spanish became the velar fricative [x] (hijo, oreja), whereas neighboring languages have the palatal lateral [ʎ] (e.g. Portuguese filho, orelha; Catalan fill, orella).

=== Segmental phonology ===
Spanish vowel chart, from Ladefoged & Johnson (2010:227)

The Spanish phonemic inventory consists of five vowel phonemes (/a/, /e/, /i/, /o/, /u/) and 17 to 19 consonant phonemes (the exact number depending on the dialect). The main allophonic variation among vowels is the reduction of the high vowels /i/ and /u/ to glides—[j] and [w] respectively—when unstressed and adjacent to another vowel. Some instances of the mid vowels /e/ and /o/, determined lexically, alternate with the diphthongs /je/ and /we/ respectively when stressed, in a process that is better described as morphophonemic rather than phonological, as it is not predictable from phonology alone.

The Spanish consonant system is characterized by (1) three nasal phonemes, and one or two (depending on the dialect) lateral phoneme(s), which in syllable-final position lose their contrast and are subject to assimilation to a following consonant; (2) three voiceless stops and the affricate /tʃ/; (3) three or four (depending on the dialect) voiceless fricatives; (4) a set of voiced obstruents—/b/, /d/, /ɡ/, and sometimes /ʝ/—which alternate between approximant and plosive allophones depending on the environment; and (5) a phonemic distinction between the "tapped" and "trilled" r-sounds (single ⟨r⟩ and double ⟨rr⟩ in orthography).

In the following table of consonant phonemes, /ʎ/ is marked with an asterisk (*) to indicate that it is preserved only in some dialects. In most dialects it has been merged with /ʝ/ in the merger called yeísmo. Similarly, /θ/ is also marked with an asterisk to indicate that most dialects do not distinguish it from /s/ (see seseo), although this is not a true merger but an outcome of different evolution of sibilants in southern Spain.

The phoneme /ʃ/ is in parentheses () to indicate that it appears only in loanwords. Each of the voiced obstruent phonemes /b/, /d/, /ʝ/, and /ɡ/ appears to the right of a pair of voiceless phonemes, to indicate that, while the voiceless phonemes maintain a phonemic contrast between plosive (or affricate) and fricative, the voiced ones alternate allophonically (i.e. without phonemic contrast) between plosive and approximant pronunciations.

Consonant phonemes
	Labial		Dental		Alveolar		Palatal		Velar	
Nasal		m				n		ɲ		
Stop	p	b	t	d			tʃ	ʝ	k	ɡ
Continuant	f	b	θ*	d	s		(ʃ)	ʝ	x	ɡ
Lateral						l		ʎ*		
Flap						ɾ				
Trill						r				

=== Prosody ===
Spanish is classified by its rhythm as a syllable-timed language: each syllable has approximately the same duration regardless of stress.

Spanish intonation varies significantly according to dialect but generally conforms to a pattern of falling tone for declarative sentences and wh-questions (who, what, why, etc.) and rising tone for yes/no questions. There are no syntactic markers to distinguish between questions and statements and thus, the recognition of declarative or interrogative depends entirely on intonation.

Stress most often occurs on any of the last three syllables of a word, with some rare exceptions at the fourth-to-last or earlier syllables. Stress tends to occur as follows:

- in words that end with a monophthong, on the penultimate syllable
- when the word ends in a diphthong, on the final syllable.
- in words that end with a consonant, on the last syllable, with the exception of two grammatical endings: -n, for third-person-plural of verbs, and -s, for plural of nouns and adjectives or for second-person-singular of verbs. However, even though a significant number of nouns and adjectives ending with -n are also stressed on the penult (joven, virgen, mitin), the great majority of nouns and adjectives ending with -n are stressed on their last syllable (capitán, almacén, jardín, corazón).
- stress on the fourth-to-last syllable occurs rarely, only on verbs with clitic pronouns attached (e.g. guardándoselos 'saving them for him/her/them/you').

In addition to the many exceptions to these tendencies, there are numerous minimal pairs that contrast solely on stress such as sábana ('sheet') and sabana ('savannah'); límite ('boundary'), limite ('he/she limits') and limité ('I limited'); líquido ('liquid'), liquido ('I sell off') and liquidó ('he/she sold off').

The orthographic system unambiguously reflects where the stress occurs: in the absence of an accent mark, the stress falls on the last syllable unless the last letter is ⟨n⟩, ⟨s⟩, or a vowel, in which case the stress falls on the next-to-last (penultimate) syllable. Exceptions to those rules are indicated by an acute accent mark over the vowel of the stressed syllable. (See Spanish orthography.)

== Speaker population ==
Spanish is the official, or national language in 18 countries and one US territory in the Americas, Spain, Equatorial Guinea, and secondarily official in the non-self-governing territory with limited recognition of Western Sahara (RASD). With a population of over 410 million, Hispanophone America accounts for the vast majority of Spanish speakers, of which Mexico is the most populous Spanish-speaking country. In the European Union, Spanish is the mother tongue of 8% of the population, with an additional 7% speaking it as a second language. Additionally, Spanish is the second most spoken language in the United States and is by far the most popular foreign language among students. In 2015, it was estimated that over 50 million U.S.citizens, about 41 million of whom were native speakers, spoke Spanish. With continued immigration and increased use of the language domestically in public spheres and media, the number of Spanish speakers in the United States is expected to continue growing over the forthcoming decades.

== Dialectal variation ==
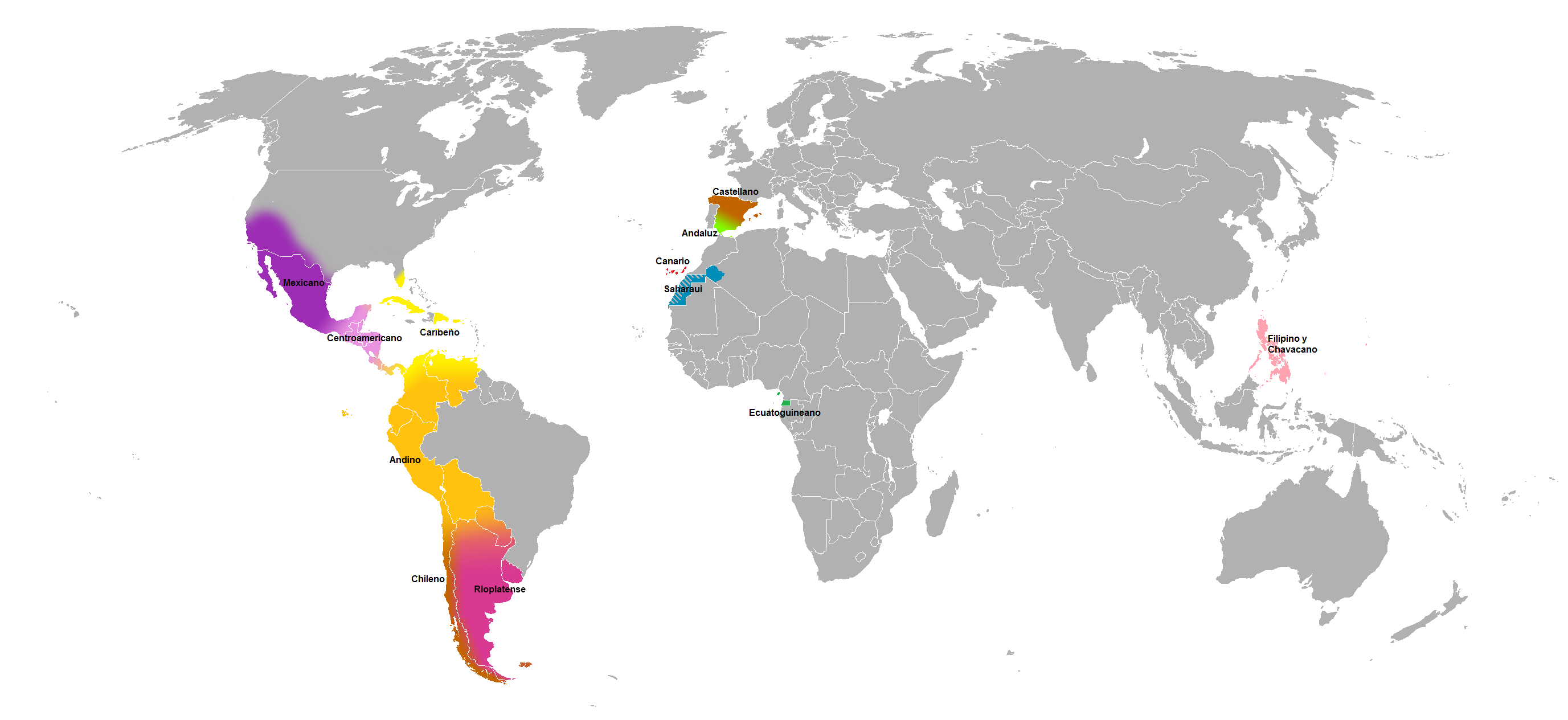
A world map attempting to identify the main dialects of Spanish

While being mutually intelligible, there are important variations (phonological, grammatical, and lexical) in the spoken Spanish of the various regions of Spain and throughout the Spanish-speaking areas of the Americas.

The national variety with the most speakers is Mexican Spanish. It is spoken by more than twenty percent of the world's Spanish speakers (more than 112 million of the total of more than 500 million, according to the table above). One of its main features is the reduction or loss of unstressed vowels, mainly when they are in contact with the sound /s/.

In Spain, northern dialects are popularly thought of as closer to the standard, although positive attitudes toward southern dialects have increased significantly in the last 50 years. The speech from the educated classes of Madrid is the standard variety for use on radio and television in Spain and it is indicated by many as the one that has most influenced the written standard for Spanish. Central (European) Spanish speech patterns have been noted to be in the process of merging with more innovative southern varieties (including Eastern Andalusian and Murcian), as an emerging interdialectal levelled koine buffered between the Madrid's traditional national standard and the Seville speech trends.

=== Phonology ===
The four main phonological divisions are based respectively on (1) the phoneme /θ/, (2) the debuccalization of syllable-final /s/, (3) the sound of the spelled ⟨s⟩, (4) and the phoneme /ʎ/.

- The phoneme /θ/ (spelled c before e or i and spelled ⟨z⟩ elsewhere), a voiceless dental fricative as in English **th**ing, is maintained by a majority of Spain's population, especially in the northern and central parts of the country. In other areas (some parts of southern Spain, the Canary Islands, and the Americas), /θ/ does not exist and /s/ occurs instead. The maintenance of phonemic contrast is called distinción in Spanish, while the merger is generally called seseo (in reference to the usual realization of the merged phoneme as [s]) or, occasionally, ceceo (referring to its interdental realization, [θ], in some parts of southern Spain). In most of Hispanic America, the spelled ⟨c⟩ before ⟨e⟩ or ⟨i⟩, and spelled ⟨z⟩ is always pronounced as a voiceless dental sibilant.
- The debuccalization (pronunciation as [h], or loss) of syllable-final /s/ is associated with the southern half of Spain and lowland Americas: Central America (except central Costa Rica and Guatemala), the Caribbean, coastal areas of southern Mexico, and South America except Andean highlands. Debuccalization is frequently called "aspiration" in English, and aspiración in Spanish. When there is no debuccalization, the syllable-final /s/ is pronounced as voiceless "apico-alveolar" sibilant or as a voiceless dental sibilant in the same fashion as in the next paragraph.
- The sound that corresponds to the letter ⟨s⟩ is pronounced in northern and central Spain as a voiceless "apico-alveolar" sibilant [s̺] (also described acoustically as "grave" and articulatorily as "retracted"), with a weak "hushing" sound reminiscent of retroflex fricatives. In Andalusia, Canary Islands and most of Hispanic America (except in the Paisa region of Colombia) it is pronounced as a voiceless dental sibilant [s], much like the most frequent pronunciation of the /s/ of English.
- The phoneme /ʎ/, spelled ⟨ll⟩, a palatal lateral consonant that can be approximated by the sound of the ⟨lli⟩ of English million, tends to be maintained in less-urbanized areas of northern Spain and in the highland areas of South America, as well as in Paraguay and lowland Bolivia. Meanwhile, in the speech of most other Spanish speakers, it is merged with /ʝ/ ("curly-tail j"), a non-lateral, usually voiced, usually fricative, palatal consonant, sometimes compared to English /j/ (yod) as in **y**acht and spelled ⟨y⟩ in Spanish. As with other forms of allophony across world languages, the small difference of the spelled ⟨ll⟩ and the spelled ⟨y⟩ is usually not perceived (the difference is not heard) by people who do not produce them as different phonemes. Such a phonemic merger is called yeísmo in Spanish. In Rioplatense Spanish, the merged phoneme is generally pronounced as a postalveolar fricative, either voiced [ʒ] (as in English measure or the French ⟨j⟩) in the central and western parts of the dialectal region (zheísmo), or voiceless [ʃ] (as in the French ⟨ch⟩ or Portuguese ⟨x⟩) in and around Buenos Aires and Montevideo (sheísmo).

=== Morphology ===
The main morphological variations between dialects of Spanish involve differing uses of pronouns, especially those of the second person and, to a lesser extent, the object pronouns of the third person.

==== Voseo ====
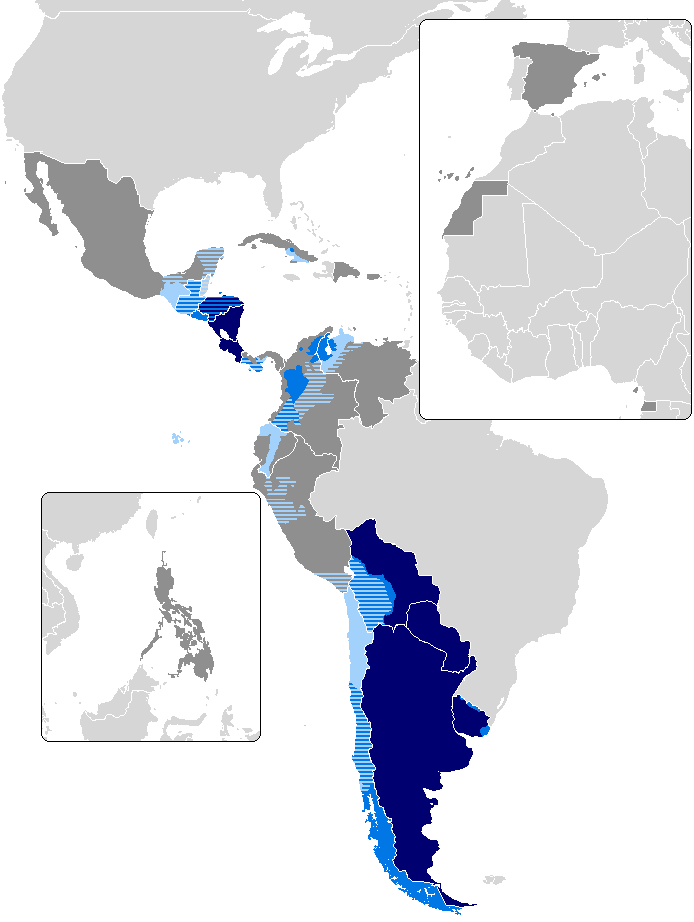
An examination of the dominance and stress of the voseo feature in Hispanic America. Data generated as illustrated by the Association of Spanish Language Academies. The darker the area, the stronger its dominance.

Virtually all dialects of Spanish make the distinction between a formal and a familiar register in the second-person singular and thus have two different pronouns meaning "you": usted in the formal and either tú or vos in the familiar (and each of these three pronouns has its associated verb forms), with the choice of tú or vos varying from one dialect to another. The use of vos and its verb forms is called voseo. In a few dialects, all three pronouns are used, with usted, tú, and vos denoting respectively formality, familiarity, and intimacy.

In voseo, vos is the subject form (vos decís, "you say") and the form for the object of a preposition (voy con vos, "I am going with you"), while the direct and indirect object forms, and the possessives, are the same as those associated with tú: Vos sabés que tus amigos te respetan ("You know your friends respect you").

The verb forms of the general voseo are the same as those used with tú except in the present tense (indicative and imperative) verbs. The forms for vos generally can be derived from those of vosotros (the traditional second-person familiar plural) by deleting the glide [i̯], or /d/, where it appears in the ending: vosotros pensáis > vos pensás; vosotros volvéis > vos volvés, pensad! (vosotros) > pensá! (vos), volved! (vosotros) > volvé! (vos).

General voseo (River Plate Spanish)
Indicative					Subjunctive		Imperative
Present	Simple past	Imperfect past	Future	Conditional	Present	Past	Imperative
pensás	**pensaste**	**pensabas**	**pensarás**	**pensarías**	**pienses**	**pensaras** **pensases**	pensá
volvés	**volviste**	**volvías**	**volverás**	**volverías**	**vuelvas**	**volvieras** **volvieses**	volvé
dormís	**dormiste**	**dormías**	**dormirás**	**dormirías**	**duermas**	**durmieras** **durmieses**	dormí
The forms in **bold** coincide with standard **tú**-conjugation.

In Central American voseo, the tú and vos forms differ in the present subjunctive as well:

Central American voseo
Indicative					Subjunctive		Imperative
Present	Simple past	Imperfect past	Future	Conditional	Present	Past	Imperative
pensás	**pensaste**	**pensabas**	**pensarás**	**pensarías**	pensés	**pensaras** **pensases**	pensá
volvés	**volviste**	**volvías**	**volverás**	**volverías**	volvás	**volvieras** **volvieses**	volvé
dormís	**dormiste**	**dormías**	**dormirás**	**dormirías**	durmás	**durmieras** **durmieses**	dormí
The forms in **bold** coincide with standard **tú**-conjugation.

In Chilean voseo, almost all vos forms are distinct from the corresponding standard tú-forms.

Chilean voseo
Indicative					Subjunctive		Imperative
Present	Simple past	Imperfect past	Future	Conditional	Present	Past	Imperative
pensái(s)	**pensaste**	pensabais	pensarí(s) pensaráis	pensaríai(s)	pensí(s)	pensarai(s) **pensases**	**piensa**
volví(s)	**volviste**	volvíai(s)	volverí(s) volveráis	volveríai(s)	volvái(s)	volvierai(s) **volvieses**	**vuelve**
dormís	**dormiste**	dormíais	dormirís dormiráis	dormiríais	durmáis	durmierais **durmieses**	**duerme**
The forms in **bold** coincide with standard **tú**-conjugation.

The use of the pronoun vos with the verb forms of tú (vos piensas) is called "pronominal voseo". Conversely, the use of the verb forms of vos with the pronoun tú (tú pensás or tú pensái) is called "verbal voseo". In Chile, for example, verbal voseo is much more common than the actual use of the pronoun vos, which is usually reserved for highly informal situations.

===== Distribution in Spanish-speaking regions of the Americas =====
Although vos is not used in Spain, it occurs in many Spanish-speaking regions of the Americas as the primary spoken form of the second-person singular familiar pronoun, with wide differences in social consideration. Generally, it can be said that there are zones of exclusive use of tuteo (the use of tú) in the following areas: almost all of Mexico, the West Indies, Panama, most of Colombia, Peru, Venezuela and coastal Ecuador.

Tuteo as a cultured form alternates with voseo as a popular or rural form in Bolivia, in the north and south of Peru, in Andean Ecuador, in small zones of the Venezuelan Andes (and most notably in the Venezuelan state of Zulia), and in a large part of Colombia. Some researchers maintain that voseo can be heard in some parts of eastern Cuba, and others assert that it is absent from the island.

Tuteo exists as the second-person usage with an intermediate degree of formality alongside the more familiar voseo in Chile, in the Venezuelan state of Zulia, on the Caribbean coast of Colombia, in the Azuero Peninsula in Panama, in the Mexican state of Chiapas, and in parts of Guatemala.

Areas of generalized voseo include Argentina, Nicaragua, eastern Bolivia, El Salvador, Guatemala, Honduras, Costa Rica, Paraguay, Uruguay and the Colombian departments of Antioquia, Caldas, Risaralda, Quindio and Valle del Cauca.

==== Ustedes ====
Ustedes functions as formal and informal second-person plural in all of Hispanic America, the Canary Islands, and parts of Andalusia. It agrees with verbs in the 3rd person plural. Most of Spain maintains the formal/familiar distinction with ustedes and vosotros respectively. The use of ustedes with the second person plural is sometimes heard in Andalusia, but it is non-standard.

==== Usted ====
Usted is the usual second-person singular pronoun in a formal context, but it is used jointly with the third-person singular voice of the verb. It is used to convey respect toward someone who is a generation older or is of higher authority ("you, sir"/"you, ma'am"). It is also used in a familiar context by many speakers in Colombia and Costa Rica and in parts of Ecuador and Panama, to the exclusion of tú or vos. This usage is sometimes called ustedeo in Spanish.

In Central America, especially in Honduras, usted is often used as a formal pronoun to convey respect between the members of a romantic couple. Usted is also used that way between parents and children in the Andean regions of Ecuador, Colombia and Venezuela.

==== Third-person object pronouns ====
Most speakers use (and the Real Academia Española prefers) the pronouns lo and la for direct objects (masculine and feminine respectively, regardless of animacy, meaning "him", "her", or "it"), and le for indirect objects (regardless of gender or animacy, meaning "to him", "to her", or "to it"). The usage is sometimes called "etymological", as these direct and indirect object pronouns are a continuation, respectively, of the accusative and dative pronouns of Latin, the ancestor language of Spanish.

A number of dialects (more common in Spain than in the Americas) use additional rules for the pronouns, such as animacy, or count noun vs. mass noun, rather than just direct vs. indirect object. The ways of using the pronouns in such varieties are called "leísmo", "loísmo", or "laísmo", according to which respective pronoun, le, lo, or la, covers more than just the etymological usage (le as a direct object, or lo or la as an indirect object).

=== Vocabulary ===
Some words can be significantly different in different Hispanophone countries. Most Spanish speakers can recognize other Spanish forms even in places where they are not commonly used, but Spaniards generally do not recognize specifically American usages. For example, Spanish mantequilla, aguacate and albaricoque (respectively, 'butter', 'avocado', 'apricot') correspond to manteca (word used for lard in Peninsular Spanish), palta, and damasco, respectively, in Argentina, Chile (except manteca), Paraguay, Peru (except manteca and damasco), and Uruguay. In the healthcare context, an assessment of the Spanish translation of the QWB-SA identified some regional vocabulary choices and US-specific concepts, which cannot be successfully implemented in Spain without adaptation.

== Vocabulary ==
Spanish vocabulary has been influenced by several languages. As in other European languages, Classical Greek words (Hellenisms) are abundant in the terminologies of several fields, including art, science, politics, nature, etc. Its vocabulary has also been influenced by Arabic, having developed during the Al-Andalus era in the Iberian Peninsula, with about 8% of its vocabulary having Arabic lexical roots. It may have also been influenced by Basque, Iberian, Celtiberian, Visigothic, and other neighboring Ibero-Romance languages. Additionally, it has absorbed vocabulary from other languages, particularly other Romance languages such as French, Mozarabic, Portuguese, Galician, Catalan, Occitan, and Sardinian, as well as from Quechua, Nahuatl, and other indigenous languages of the Americas. In the 18th century, words taken from French referring above all to fashion, cooking and bureaucracy were added to the Spanish lexicon. In the 19th century, new loanwords were incorporated, especially from English and German, but also from Italian in areas related to music, particularly opera and cooking. In the 20th century, the pressure of English in the fields of technology, computing, science and sports was greatly accentuated.

In general, Hispanic America is more susceptible to loanwords from English or Anglicisms. For example: mouse (computer mouse) is used in Hispanic America, in Spain ratón is used. This happens largely due to closer contact with the United States. For its part, Spain is known by the use of Gallicisms or words taken from neighboring France (such as the Gallicism ordenador in European Spanish, in contrast to the Anglicism computador or computadora in American Spanish).

== Relation to other languages ==
Spanish is closely related to the other West Iberian Romance languages, including Asturian, Aragonese, Galician, Ladino, Leonese, Mirandese and Portuguese. It is somewhat less similar, to varying degrees, from other members of the Romance language family.

It is generally acknowledged that Portuguese and Spanish speakers can communicate in written form, with varying degrees of mutual intelligibility. Mutual intelligibility of the written Spanish and Portuguese languages is high, lexically and grammatically. Ethnologue gives estimates of the lexical similarity between related languages in terms of precise percentages. For Spanish and Portuguese, that figure is 89%, although phonologically the two languages are quite dissimilar. Italian on the other hand, is phonologically similar to Spanish, while sharing lower lexical and grammatical similarity of 82%. Mutual intelligibility between Spanish and French or between Spanish and Romanian is lower still, given lexical similarity ratings of 75% and 71% respectively. Comprehension of Spanish by French speakers who have not studied the language is much lower, at an estimated 45%. In general, thanks to the common features of the writing systems of the Romance languages, interlingual comprehension of the written word is greater than that of oral communication.

The following table compares the forms of some common words in several Romance languages:

Latin	Spanish	Galician	Portuguese	Astur-Leonese	Aragonese	Catalan	French	Italian	Romanian	English
nōs (alterōs)^{1,2} "we (others)"	nosotros	nós, nosoutros^{3}	nós, nós outros^{3}	nós, nosotros	nusatros	nosaltres (arch. nós)	nous^{4}	noi, noialtri^{5}	noi	'we'
frātre(m) germānu(m) "true brother"	hermano	irmán	irmão	hermanu	chirmán	germà (arch. frare)^{6}	frère	fratello	frate	'brother'
die(m) mārtis (Classical) "day of Mars" tertia(m) fēria(m) (Late Latin) "third (holi)day"	martes	Martes, Terza Feira	Terça-Feira	Martes	Martes	Dimarts	Mardi	Martedì	Marți	'Tuesday'
cantiōne(m) canticu(m)	canción^{7} (arch. cançón)	canción, cançom^{8}	canção	canción (also canciu)	canta	cançó	chanson	canzone	cântec	'song'
magis plūs	más (arch. plus)	máis	mais	más	más (also més)	més (arch. pus or plus)	plus	più	mai	'more'
manu(m) sinistra(m)	mano izquierda^{9} (arch. mano siniestra)	man esquerda^{9}	mão esquerda^{9} (arch. mão sẽestra)	manu izquierda^{9} (or esquierda; also manzorga)	man cucha	mà esquerra^{9} (arch. mà sinistra)	main gauche	mano sinistra	mâna stângă	'left hand'
rēs, rĕm "thing" nūlla(m) rem nāta(m) "no born thing" mīca(m) "crumb"	nada	nada (also ren and res)	nada (arch. rés)	nada (also un res)	cosa	res	rien, nul	niente, nulla mica (negative particle)	nimic, nul	'nothing'
cāseu(m) fōrmāticu(m) "form-cheese"	queso	queixo	queijo	quesu	queso	formatge	fromage	formaggio/cacio	caș^{10}	'cheese'

1. In Romance etymology, Latin terms are given in the Accusative since most forms derive from this case.
2. As in "us very selves", an emphatic expression.
3. Also nós outros in early modern Portuguese (e.g. The Lusiads), and nosoutros in Galician.
4. Alternatively nous autres in French.
5. noialtri in many Southern Italian dialects and languages.
6. Medieval Catalan (e.g. Llibre dels fets).
7. Modified with the learned suffix -ción.
8. Depending on the written norm used (see Reintegrationism).
9. From Basque esku, "hand" + erdi, "half, incomplete". This negative meaning also applies for Latin sinistra(m) ("dark, unfortunate").
10. Romanian caș (from Latin cāsevs) means a type of cheese. The universal term for cheese in Romanian is brânză (from unknown etymology).

=== Judaeo-Spanish ===
The Rashi script, originally used to print Judaeo-Spanish

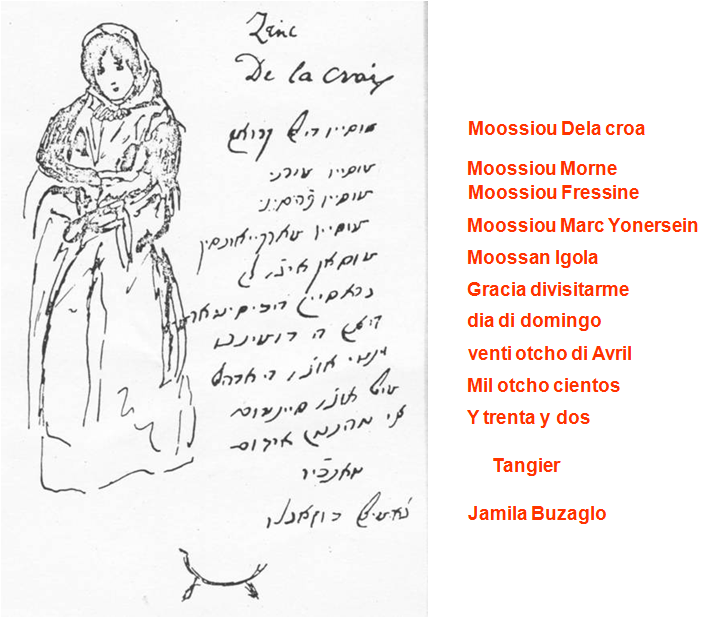
An original letter in Haketia, written in 1832

Judaeo-Spanish, also known as Ladino, is a variety of Spanish which preserves many features of medieval Spanish and some old Portuguese and is spoken by descendants of the Sephardi Jews who were expelled from Spain in the 15th century. While in Portugal the conversion of Jews occurred earlier and the assimilation of New Christians was overwhelming, in Spain the Jews kept their language and identity. The relationship of Ladino and Spanish is therefore comparable with that of the Yiddish language to German. Ladino speakers today are almost exclusively Sephardi Jews, with family roots in Turkey, Greece, or the Balkans, and living mostly in Israel, Turkey, and the United States, with a few communities in Hispanic America. Judaeo-Spanish lacks the Native American vocabulary which was acquired by standard Spanish during the Spanish colonial period, and it retains many archaic features which have since been lost in standard Spanish. It contains, however, other vocabulary which is not found in standard Spanish, including vocabulary from Hebrew, French, Greek and Turkish, and other languages spoken where the Sephardim settled.

Judaeo-Spanish is in serious danger of extinction because many native speakers today are elderly as well as elderly olim (immigrants to Israel) who have not transmitted the language to their children or grandchildren. However, it is experiencing a minor revival among Sephardi communities, especially in music. In Hispanic American communities, the danger of extinction is also due to assimilation by modern Spanish.

A related dialect is Haketia, the Judaeo-Spanish of northern Morocco. This too, tended to assimilate with modern Spanish, during the Spanish occupation of the region.

== Writing system ==
Spanish is written in the Latin script, with the addition of the character ⟨ñ⟩ (eñe, representing the phoneme /ɲ/, a letter distinct from ⟨n⟩, although typographically composed of an ⟨n⟩ with a tilde). Formerly the digraphs ⟨ch⟩ (che, representing the phoneme /t͡ʃ/) and ⟨ll⟩ (elle, representing the phoneme /ʎ/ or /ʝ/), were also considered single letters. However, the digraph ⟨rr⟩ (erre fuerte, 'strong r', erre doble, 'double r', or simply erre), which also represents a distinct phoneme /r/, was not similarly regarded as a single letter. Since 1994 ⟨ch⟩ and ⟨ll⟩ have been treated as letter pairs for collation purposes, though they remained a part of the alphabet until 2010. Words with ⟨ch⟩ are now alphabetically sorted between those with ⟨cg⟩ and ⟨ci⟩, instead of following ⟨cz⟩ as they used to. The situation is similar for ⟨ll⟩.

Thus, the Spanish alphabet has the following 27 letters:

A, B, C, D, E, F, G, H, I, J, K, L, M, N, Ñ, O, P, Q, R, S, T, U, V, W, X, Y, Z.

Since 2010, none of the digraphs (ch, ll, rr, gu, qu) are considered letters by the Royal Spanish Academy.

The letters k and w are used only in words and names coming from foreign languages (kilo, folklore, whisky, kiwi, etc.).

With the exclusion of a very small number of regional terms such as México (see Toponymy of Mexico), pronunciation can be entirely determined from spelling. Under the orthographic conventions, a typical Spanish word is stressed on the syllable before the last if it ends with a vowel (not including ⟨y⟩) or with a vowel followed by ⟨n⟩ or an ⟨s⟩; it is stressed on the last syllable otherwise. Exceptions to this rule are indicated by placing an acute accent on the stressed vowel.

The acute accent is used, in addition, to distinguish between certain homophones, especially when one of them is a stressed word and the other one is a clitic: compare el ('the', masculine singular definite article) with él ('he' or 'it'), or te ('you', object pronoun) with té ('tea'), de (preposition 'of') versus dé ('give' [formal imperative/third-person present subjunctive]), and se (reflexive pronoun) versus sé ('I know' or imperative 'be').

The interrogative pronouns (qué, cuál, dónde, quién, etc.) also receive accents in direct or indirect questions, and some demonstratives (ése, éste, aquél, etc.) can be accented when used as pronouns. Accent marks used to be omitted on capital letters (a widespread practice in the days of typewriters and the early days of computers when only lowercase vowels were available with accents), although the Real Academia Española advises against this and the orthographic conventions taught at schools enforce the use of the accent.

When u is written between g and a front vowel e or i, it indicates a "hard g" pronunciation. A diaeresis ü indicates that it is not silent as it normally would be (e.g., cigüeña, 'stork', is pronounced [θiˈɣweɲa]; if it were written *cigueña, it would be pronounced *[θiˈɣeɲa]).

Interrogative and exclamatory clauses are introduced with inverted question and exclamation marks (¿ and ¡, respectively) and closed by the usual question and exclamation marks.

== Organizations ==
=== Royal Spanish Academy ===
The Royal Spanish Academy (Real Academia Española), founded in 1713, together with the 21 other national ones (see Association of Spanish Language Academies), exercises a standardizing influence through its publication of dictionaries and widely respected grammar and style guides. Because of influence and for other sociohistorical reasons, a standardized form of the language (Standard Spanish) is widely acknowledged for use in literature, academic contexts and the media.

=== Association of Spanish Language Academies ===
Member states of the ASALE

The Association of Spanish Language Academies (Asociación de Academias de la Lengua Española, or ASALE) is the entity which regulates the Spanish language. It was created in Mexico in 1951 and represents the union of all the separate academies in the Spanish-speaking world. It comprises the academies of 23 countries, ordered by date of academy foundation: Spain (1713), Colombia (1871), Ecuador (1874), Mexico (1875), El Salvador (1876), Venezuela (1883), Chile (1885), Peru (1887), Guatemala (1887), Costa Rica (1923), Philippines (1924), Panama (1926), Cuba (1926), Paraguay (1927), Dominican Republic (1927), Bolivia (1927), Nicaragua (1928), Argentina (1931), Uruguay (1943), Honduras (1949), Puerto Rico (1955), United States (1973) and Equatorial Guinea (2016).

=== Cervantes Institute ===
The Instituto Cervantes ('Cervantes Institute') is a worldwide nonprofit organization created by the Spanish government in 1991. This organization has branches in 45 countries, with 88 centers devoted to the Spanish and Hispanic American cultures and Spanish language. The goals of the Institute are to promote universally the education, the study, and the use of Spanish as a second language, to support methods and activities that help the process of Spanish-language education, and to contribute to the advancement of the Spanish and Hispanic American cultures in non-Spanish-speaking countries. The institute's 2015 report "El español, una lengua viva" (Spanish, a living language) estimated that there were 559 million Spanish speakers worldwide. Its latest annual report "El español en el mundo 2018" (Spanish in the world 2018) counts 577 million Spanish speakers worldwide. Among the sources cited in the report is the U.S. Census Bureau, which estimates that the U.S. will have 138 million Spanish speakers by 2050, making it the biggest Spanish-speaking nation on earth, with Spanish the mother tongue of almost a third of its citizens.

=== Official use by international organizations ===
Spanish is one of the official languages of the United Nations, the European Union, the World Trade Organization, the Organization of American States, the Organization of Ibero-American States, the African Union, the Union of South American Nations, the Antarctic Treaty Secretariat, the Latin Union, the Caricom, the North American Free Trade Agreement, the Inter-American Development Bank, and numerous other international organizations.

== Sample text ==
Article 1 of the Universal Declaration of Human Rights in Spanish:

Todos los seres humanos nacen libres e iguales en dignidad y derechos y, dotados como están de razón y conciencia, deben comportarse fraternalmente los unos con los otros.

Article 1 of the Universal Declaration of Human Rights in English:

All human beings are born free and equal in dignity and rights. They are endowed with reason and conscience and should act towards one another in a spirit of brotherhood.

== See also ==
=== Spanish words and phrases ===
- Café para todos
- Cuento
- List of English–Spanish interlingual homographs
- Longest word in Spanish
- Most common words in Spanish
- Olé
- Olé, Olé, Olé
- Spanish profanity
- Spanish proverbs
- Tertulia
- Vale un Perú

=== Spanish-speaking world ===
- Association of Academies of the Spanish Language
- Countries where Spanish is an official language
- Hispanic culture
- Hispanicization
- Hispanidad
- Hispanism
- Hispanophone
- Fundéu BBVA
- Instituto Cervantes
- International Conference of the Spanish Language
- List of Spanish-language poets
- Panhispanism
- Royal Spanish Academy
- Spanish-language literature
- Spanish-language music

=== Influences on the Spanish language ===
- Arabic language influence on the Spanish language
- List of Spanish words of Germanic origin
- List of Spanish words of Philippine origin

=== Dialects and languages influenced by Spanish ===
- Alemañol
- Barranquenho
- Caló
- Chamorro
- Chavacano
- Creoles
- Frespañol
- Jopara
- Judaeo-Spanish
- List of English words of Spanish origin
- Llanito
- Media Lengua
- Palenquero
- Papiamento
- Philippine languages
- Portuñol
- Spanglish

=== Spanish dialects and varieties ===
- Spanish dialects and varieties
- European Spanish
  - Peninsular Spanish
    - Andalusian Spanish
      - Andalusian language movement
    - Castilian Spanish
    - Castrapo (Galician Spanish)
    - Castúo (Extremaduran Spanish)
    - Murcian Spanish
  - Canarian Spanish
- Spanish language in the Americas
  - North American Spanish
    - Mexican Spanish
    - Spanish in the United States
  - Central American Spanish
  - Caribbean Spanish
  - South American Spanish
    - Bolivian Spanish
    - Chilean Spanish
    - Colombian Spanish
    - Ecuadorian Spanish
    - Paraguayan Spanish
    - Peruvian Spanish
    - Uruguayan Spanish
    - Venezuelan Spanish
- Spanish in Africa
  - Equatoguinean Spanish
  - Saharan Spanish
- Spanish in Asia
  - Spanish in the Philippines
