= Adpositional case =

Grammatical case

In grammar, the prepositional case (abbreviated PREP) and the postpositional case (abbreviated POST) - generalised as adpositional cases - are grammatical cases that respectively mark the object of a preposition and a postposition. This term can be used in languages where nouns have a declensional form that appears exclusively in combination with certain prepositions.

Because the objects of these prepositions often denote locations, this case is also sometimes called the locative case: Czech and Slovak lokál/lokativ/lokatív, miejscownik in Polish. This is in concord with its origin: the Slavic prepositional case hails from the Proto-Indo-European locative case (present in Armenian, Sanskrit, and Old Latin, among others). The so-called "second locative" found in modern Russian has ultimately the same origin.

In Irish and Scottish Gaelic, nouns that are the objects of (most) prepositions may be marked with prepositional case, especially if preceded by the definite article. In traditional grammars, and in scholarly treatments of the early language, the term dative case is incorrectly used for the prepositional case. This case is exclusively associated with prepositions. However, not all prepositions trigger prepositional case marking, and a small group of prepositions which are termed compound mark their objects with genitive case, these prepositions being historically derived from the fusion of a preposition plus a following noun which has become grammaticalised. (Compare English "in front of", "because of".) Note however that many nouns no longer exhibit distinct prepositional case forms in the conversational language.

In the Pashto language, there also exists a case that occurs only in combination with certain prepositions. It is more often called the "first oblique" than the prepositional.

In many other languages, the term "prepositional case" is inappropriate, since the forms of nouns selected by prepositions also appear in non-prepositional contexts. For example, in English, prepositions govern the objective (or accusative) case, and so do verbs. In German, prepositions can govern the genitive, dative, or accusative, and none of these cases are exclusively associated with prepositions.

Sindhi is a language which can be said to have a postpositional case. Nominals in Sindhi can take a “contracted” oblique form which may be used in ergative, dative, or locative constructions without a postposition, or a “full” oblique case ending expressed when forming a postpositional phrase. Differences in these forms are only observed in the plural.

== See also ==
- Prepositional pronoun (in some languages, a special pronoun form that is used with prepositions and hence could be called the prepositional case of that pronoun)
