= Worth a Peru =

Spanish language phrase

Worth a Peru (Spanish: Vale un Perú) is a Spanish language phrase which has come to symbolize a matter of great value. The term originated in the colonial times of the Viceroyalty of Peru, and is still used in various parts of Latin America. Spanish colonists created the phrase in order to describe the depths of Peru's riches. Peruvian bullion provided revenue for the Spanish Crown and fueled a complex trade network that extended as far as Europe and the Philippines.

According to the Royal Spanish Academy, the official royal institution responsible for regulating the Spanish language, the term "Vale un Peru" can be defined as "being of high price or estimation" (Spanish: "Ser de mucho precio o estimación").
