= Prepositional pronoun =

Form of personal pronoun

A prepositional pronoun is a special form of a personal pronoun that is used as the object of a preposition.

English does not have a distinct grammatical case that relates solely to prepositional pronouns. Certain genitive pronouns (e.g. a friend of hers; that dog of yours is as friendly as mine) both complement prepositions and also may function as subjects. Additionally, object pronouns (e.g. watch him; look at him) may complement either prepositions or transitive verbs. In some other languages, a special set of pronouns is required in prepositional contexts (although the individual pronouns in this set may also be found in other contexts).

== Inflectional forms in Romance ==
In the Romance languages, prepositions combine with stressed pronominal forms that are distinct from the unstressed clitic pronouns used with verbs. In French, prepositions combine with disjunctive pronouns, which are also found in other syntactic contexts (see French disjunctive pronouns). In Portuguese, Spanish, Italian, and Romanian, prepositions generally combine with pronouns that are identical in form to nominative (subject) pronouns, but there are unique prepositional forms for the 1st and 2nd person singular (and 3rd person reflexive). This is also true in Catalan, but the 2nd person singular prepositional form is identical to the nominative. Portuguese and Spanish also have unique forms for 1st, 2nd and 3rd person reflexive when they follow the preposition com/con ('with'). That holds true for both singular and plural pronouns for Portuguese, but only for singular in Spanish.

Consider the Portuguese sentences below:

Vejo-te todos os dias. (enclitic object of verb)
"I see you every day."

Não te culpo. (proclitic object of verb)
"I don't blame you."

Anseio por ti. (prepositional pronoun)
"I long for you."

Vou contigo. (prepositional pronoun after com)
"I'm going with you."

The verbs ver "to see" and culpar "to blame" in the first two sentences are non-prepositional, so they are accompanied by the normal object pronoun te "you". In the third sentence, the verb ansiar (por) "to long (for)" is prepositional, so its object, which follows the preposition, takes the form ti.

== Prefixed forms in Slavic ==
In many Slavic languages (e.g. Czech, Polish, and Russian), prepositional pronouns have the same basic case-inflected forms as pronouns in other syntactic contexts. However, the 3rd-person non-reflexive pronouns (which are vowel- or glide-initial) take the prefix n- when they are the object of a preposition. The following examples are from Russian:

Его здесь нет.
Him-GEN here not
"He's not here."

Я это делаю для него.
I this do for н-him-GEN
"I do this for him."

Я наблюдаю его.
I watch him-ACC
"I watch him."

Я смотрю на него.
I look on him-ACC
"I look at him."

== See also ==
- Prepositional case
- Portuguese pronouns
- Spanish pronouns
- French personal pronouns
