= Spanish adjectives =

Adjectives in the Spanish language

Spanish adjectives are similar to those in most other Indo-European languages. They are generally postpositive, and they agree in both gender and number with the noun they modify.

== Inflection and usage ==
Spanish adjectives can be broadly divided into two groups: those whose lemma (the base form, the form found in dictionaries) ends in -o, and those whose lemma does not. The former generally inflect for both gender and number; the latter generally inflect just for number. Frío ("cold"), for example, inflects for both gender and number. When it is used with a masculine singular noun, the masculine singular form frío (the lemma) is used. When it is used with a feminine singular noun, it becomes fría; -a is generally the feminine singular ending for adjectives that inflect for gender. When it is used with a masculine plural noun, it becomes fríos, and when it is used with a feminine plural noun, it becomes frías; -s is the plural marker for both the masculine and feminine with adjectives that inflect for gender. Thus:

- frío ("cold") → frío, fría, fríos, frías
- pequeño ("small") → pequeño, pequeña, pequeños, pequeñas
- rojo ("red") → rojo, roja, rojos, rojas

Adjectives whose lemma does not end in -o, however, inflect differently. These adjectives almost always inflect only for number. -s is once again the plural marker, and if the lemma ends in a consonant, the adjective takes -es in the plural. Thus:

- caliente ("hot") → caliente, caliente, calientes, calientes
- formal ("formal") → formal, formal, formales, formales
- verde ("green") → verde, verde, verdes, verdes

This division into two groups is a generalization, however. There are many examples, such as the adjective español itself, of adjectives whose lemmas do not end in -o but nevertheless take -a in the feminine singular as well as -as in the feminine plural and thus have four forms: in the case of español, española, españoles, españolas. There are also adjectives that do not inflect at all (generally words borrowed from other languages, such as the French beige (also Hispanicised to beis)).

Spanish adjectives are very similar to nouns and are often interchangeable with them. Bare adjectives can be used with articles and thus function as nouns where English would require nominalization using the pronoun one(s). For example:

- El rojo va aquí/acá, ¿no? = "The red one goes here, doesn't it?"
- Tenemos que tirar las estropeadas = "We have to throw away the broken ones"

Masculine singular adjectives can also be used with the neuter article lo to signify "the [adjective] thing, the [adjective] part". Thus:

- lo extraño = "the strange thing, the strange part"
- lo inusual = "the unusual thing, the unusual part"

The only inflectionally irregular adjectives in Spanish are those that have irregular comparative forms, and only four do.

Spanish adjectives are generally postpositive, that is, they come after the noun they modify. Thus el libro largo ("the long book"), la casa grande ("the big house"), los hombres altos ("the tall men"), etc. There are, however, a small number of adjectives, including all ordinal numerals as well as words such as otro ("other") and todo ("all"), that must be placed before the noun they modify. There are also a small number that can be placed both before and after the noun and that change meaning according to that positioning, and some adjectives, especially those that form something of a fixed phrase with the noun (e.g. oscura noche ("dark night"), alta montaña ("high mountain")), can be placed before or after the noun with little change in meaning.

=== Apocope ===
A small number of adjectives have apocopic forms: forms in which the final sound or two is dropped in certain environments. They are:

Base form	Apocopic form	Environment
alguno ("some")	algún	before masculine singular nouns
bueno ("good")	buen	before masculine singular nouns
ciento ("hundred")	cien	before nouns and, in composite numbers, before numbers greater than or equal to mil ("thousand")
cualquiera ("whatever", singular) cualesquiera (plural)	cualquier cualesquier	before the noun
grande ("big, grand")	gran	before singular nouns
malo ("bad")	mal	before masculine singular nouns
ninguno ("no, none")	ningún	before masculine singular nouns
primero ("first")	primer	before masculine singular nouns
tercero ("third")	tercer	before masculine singular nouns
uno ("one")	un	before masculine singular nouns; also used in place of una in certain environments (same rules apply to veintiuno ("twenty-one"))

Apocopic forms are used even when the word does not come immediately before the noun: algún fresco pan ("some fresh bread"), el primer gran árbol ("the first big tree"), ningún otro hombre ("no other man"), etc. In the case of grande, which is the only apocopic adjective with regular comparative and superlative forms (más grande and el más grande, respectively), the comparative and superlative apocopate in the same manner as the positive: la más gran casa but la casa más grande, el más gran coche de los dos but el coche más grande de los dos, etc. If a conjunction intervenes between the adjective and the noun, however, apocopic forms are not used: esta grande y bella casa ("this big and beautiful house"), el primero o segundo día ("the first or second day"), etc.

== Words that change meaning ==
Several adjectives change meaning depending on their position: either before or after the noun. They are:

Before noun	Word	After noun
former	antiguo	ancient
certain (particular)	cierto	certain (sure)
darn	dichoso	lucky, happy
great, impressive	grande (gran)	large (physically)
half-	medio	middle, average
same	mismo	(the thing) itself
another, different	nuevo	brand new
unfortunate	pobre	poor
own	propio	proper
sheer	puro	pure
only	único	unique
former, long-standing	viejo	old, aged

== Comparatives and superlatives ==
Comparatives are normally expressed with the adverbs más ("more") and menos ("less") followed by the adjective; the object of comparison is introduced with the particle que ("than"). For example, X es más grande que Y ("X is bigger/greater than Y"). Superlatives (in the cross-linguistic, semantic sense) are also expressed with the adverbs más and menos, but this time with a definite article preceding the noun: la persona más interesante ("the most interesting person"); the object of comparison is introduced with the preposition de ("of"). The adjectives bueno ("good"), malo ("bad"), joven ("young"), and viejo ("old") have irregular comparative forms: mejor ("better"), peor ("worse"), menor ("younger"), and mayor ("older"), respectively. Mejor and peor are placed before the nouns they modify: la mejor cosa, ("the best thing"), el peor libro ("the worst book"), etc.

Because the definite article is, along with más or menos, the superlative marker, the comparative is grammatically indistinguishable from the superlative when it is used; an additional qualifier phrase such as de los dos ("of the two") must therefore be used to indicate that the adjective is the comparative.

== The superlative ==
Instead of putting muy, "very" before an adjective, one can use a special form called the superlative to intensify an idea. This consists of the suffix -ísimo. This form derives from the Latin superlative, but no longer means "the most ...", which is expressed in the ways explained above. Nevertheless, the name is retained for historical reasons.

Regular forms

- muy rápido → rapidísimo
- muy guapas → guapísimas
- muy rica → riquísima
- muy lento → lentísimo
- muy duro → durísimo

Irregular forms

- muy antiguo → antiquísimo
- muy inferior → ínfimo
- muy joven → jovencísimo
- muy superior → supremo
- muy bueno → óptimo (buenísimo is more common, and there is the unusual bonísimo)
- muy malo → pésimo (malísimo is more common)
- muy grande → máximo* (grandísimo is more common)
- muy pequeño → mínimo* (pequeñísimo is more common)

*These two forms keep the original meaning of the superlative: not "very" but "the most".

Forms that are irregular in high literary style but not normally

- muy amigo → amicísimo/amiguísimo
- muy áspero → aspérrimo/asperísimo
- muy benévolo → benevolentísimo/not used
- muy célebre → celebérrimo/not used
- muy cruel → crudelísimo/cruelísimo
- muy fácil → facílimo/facilísimo
- muy fiel → fidelísimo/fielísimo
- muy frío → frigidísimo/friísimo
- muy íntegro → integérrimo/integrísimo
- muy libre → libérrimo/librísimo
- muy magnífico → magnificentísimo/not used
- muy mísero → misérrimo/not used
- muy munífico → munificentísimo/not used
- muy pobre → paupérrimo/pobrísimo
- muy sabio → sapientísimo/not used
- muy sagrado → sacratísimo/not used

Forms no longer considered superlative

- muy agrio ("very bitter") → acérrimo ("strong, zealous, fanatic")

Applying -ísimo to nouns is not common, but there is the famous case of Generalísimo.

As in English and other languages influenced by it, a teenspeak superlative can be formed by the prefix super-, or sometimes hiper-, ultra-, re- or requete-. They can also be written as adverbs separate from the word.

- Superlargo or súper largo = "super-long", "way long"

== Suffixes ==
=== The suffix -dor, -dora ===
Many terms suffixed in -dor, -dora are nouns formed by other nouns or verbs (equivalent to English noun + er or verb + er). Usually adjectives correspond to verb + dor/a (equivalent to English verb + ing) derived from the three conjugations:

-ar verbs	-er verbs	-ir verbs
agotar ("to exhaust") → agotador ("exhausting")	acoger ("to welcome") → acogedor ("welcoming")	contribuir ("to contribute") → contribuidor ("contributing")
inspirar ("to inspire") → inspirador ("inspiring")	merecer ("to deserve") → merecedor ("deserving")	corregir ("to correct") → corregidor ("correcting")
revelar ("to reveal") → revelador ("revealing")	poseer ("to possess") → poseedor ("possessing")	medir ("to measure") → medidor ("measuring")

Examples:

- Los bailes fueron agotadores = "The dances were exhausting"
- Una biografía inspiradora = "An inspiring biography" (or lit. "A biography that inspires")

==== -sitor, -sitora ====
An alternative form, -sitor, -sitora, corresponds to verbs ending in -poner:

-poner verbs
componer ("to compose") → compositor ("composing")
exponer ("to expose") → expositor ("exposing")
oponer ("to oppose") → opositor ("opposing")

(Although uncommon, these are suffixed regularly as componedor, exponedor, and oponedor)

Example:

- El lado opositor = "The opposing side" (or lit. "The side that opposes")

==== -tor, -tora ====
Another alternative, -tor, -tora, corresponds to verbs ending in -ducir and -venir:

-ducir verbs	-venir verbs
conducir ("to conduct") → conductor ("conducting")	contravenir ("to contravene") → contraventor ("contravening")
introducir ("to introduce") → introductor ("introducing")	intervenir ("to intervene") → interventor ("intervening")

(Although uncommon, these are suffixed regularly as conducidor, introducidor, contravenidor, and intervenidor)

Example:

- Capacidad interventora = "Intervening capacity" (or lit. "Capacity that intervenes")
