= Pronouns in Spanish =

Word class in the Spanish language

Spanish pronouns in some ways work quite differently from their English counterparts. Subject pronouns are often omitted, and object pronouns come in clitic and non-clitic forms. When used as clitics, object pronouns can appear as proclitics that come before the verb or as enclitics attached to the end of the verb in different linguistic environments. There is also regional variation in the use of pronouns, particularly the use of the informal second-person singular vos and the informal second-person plural vosotros.

== Personal pronouns ==
Personal pronouns in Spanish have distinct forms according to whether they stand for a subject (nominative), a direct object (accusative), an indirect object (dative), or a reflexive object. Several pronouns further have special forms used after prepositions. Spanish is a pro-drop language with respect to subject pronouns. Like French and other languages with the T–V distinction, Spanish has a distinction in its second person pronouns that has no equivalent in modern English. Object pronouns come in two forms: clitic and non-clitic, or stressed. With clitics, object pronouns are generally proclitic, but enclitic forms are mandatory in certain environments. The personal pronoun "vos" is used in some areas of Latin America, particularly in Central America, Argentina, Uruguay, Paraguay, Chile, the state of Zulia in Venezuela, and the Andean regions of Colombia, Bolivia, Peru, and Ecuador.

The table below shows a list of personal pronouns from Peninsular, Latin American and Ladino Spanish. Ladino or Judaeo-Spanish, spoken by Sephardic Jews, is different from Latin American and Peninsular Spanish in that it retains rather archaic forms and usage of personal pronouns.

Number	Person	Nominative	Prepositional	Comitative	Accusative	Dative	Genitive
Singular	1st	yo	mí	conmigo	me		mío(s)/mía(s)
Singular	2nd	tú, vos^{1}	ti, vos^{1}	contigo, con vos^{1}	te		tuyo(s)/tuya(s)
Singular	3rd	él/ella/ello, usted	él/ella/ello, usted, sí	con él/ella/ello, con usted, consigo	lo/la, se	le, se	suyo(s)/suya(s)
Plural	1st	nosotros/nosotras		con nosotros/nosotras	nos		nuestro(s)/nuestra(s)
Plural	2nd	vosotros/vosotras^{2}		con vosotros/vosotras^{2}	os^{2}		vuestro(s)/vuestra(s)^{2}
Plural	3rd	ellos/ellas, ustedes	ellos/ellas, ustedes, sí	con ellos/ellas, con ustedes, consigo	los/las, se	les, se	suyo(s)/suya(s)

^{1} Only in countries with voseo (Argentina, Chile, Uruguay, Eastern Bolivia, Paraguay, and across Central America: El Salvador, Guatemala, Honduras, Nicaragua, Costa Rica, southern parts of Chiapas in Mexico)
^{2} Primarily in Spain; other countries use ustedes as the plural regardless of level of formality. A disused equivalent of vuestro(s)/vuestra(s) is voso(s)/vosa(s).

Note: Usted and ustedes are grammatically third person even though they are functionally second person (they express you / you all). See Spanish personal pronouns for more information and the regional variation of pronoun use.

== Demonstrative pronouns ==
- Near the speaker ("this"): éste, ésta, esto, éstos, éstas (from the Latin iste, ista, istvd)
- Near the listener ("that"): ése, ésa, eso, ésos, ésas (from the Latin ipse, ipsa, ipsvm)
- Far from both speaker and listener ("that (over there)"): aquél, aquélla, aquello, aquéllos, aquéllas (from the Latin *eccvm ille, *eccvm illa, *eccvm illvd)

According to a decision by the Real Academia in the 1960s, the accents should be used only when it is necessary to avoid ambiguity with the demonstrative determiners. However, the normal educated standard is still as above. Foreign learners may safely adhere to either standard. There is also no accent on the neuter forms esto, eso and aquello, which do not have determiner equivalents.

== Relative pronouns ==
The main relative pronoun in Spanish is que, from Latin qvid. Others include el cual, quien, and donde.

=== Que ===
Que covers "that", "which", "who", "whom" and the null pronoun in their functions of subject and direct-object relative pronouns:

- La carta que te envié era larga = "The letter [that] I sent you was long" (restrictive relative pronoun referring to direct object)
- La carta, que te envié, era larga = "The letter, which I did send you, was long" (non-restrictive relative pronoun referring to direct object)
- La gente que no sabe leer ni escribir se llama analfabeta = "People who cannot read or write are called illiterate" (relative pronoun referring to subject)
- Esa persona, que conozco muy bien, no es de fiar = "That person, whom I know very well, is not trustworthy" (non-restrictive relative pronoun referring to direct object)

Note from the last example that unlike with other relative pronouns, personal a does not have to be used with que when used as a personal direct object.

==== El que ====
When que is used as the object of a preposition, the definite article is added to it, and the resulting form (el que) inflects for number and gender, resulting in the forms el que, la que, los que, las que and the neuter lo que. Unlike in English, the preposition must go right before the relative pronoun "which" or "whom":

- Ella es la persona a la que le di el dinero = "She is the person [that/whom] I gave the money to"/"She is the person to whom I gave the money"
- Es el camino por el que caminabais = "It is the path [that] you all were walking along"/"It is the path along which you all were walking"

In some people's style of speaking, the definite article may be omitted after a, con and de in such usage, particularly when the antecedent is abstract or neuter:

- La aspereza con [la] que la trataba = "The harshness with which he treated her"
- No tengo nada en [lo] que creer = "I have nothing to believe in"/"I have nothing in which to believe"

After en, the definite article tends to be omitted if precise spatial location is not intended:

- Lo hiciste de la misma forma en que lo hizo él = "You did it [in] the same way [that/in which] he did it" (note also how "in" with the word forma is translated as de when used directly, but then changes to en when used with the relative pronoun)
- La casa en que vivo = "The house in which I live" (as opposed to La casa en la que estoy encerrado = "The house inside which I am trapped")

==== Lo que ====
When used without a precise antecedent, lo que has a slightly different meaning from that of el que, and is usually used as the connotation of "that which" or "what":

- Lo que hiciste fue malo = "What you did was bad"
- Lo que creí no es correcto = "What I believed is not right"

=== El cual ===
The pronoun el cual can replace [el] que. It is generally more emphatic and formal than [el] que, and it always includes the definite article. It is derived from the Latin qvalis, and it has the following forms: el cual, la cual, los cuales, las cuales, and the neuter lo cual. It can be used as a formal, emphatic replacement for que in non-defining clauses, for both subjects and direct objects, and it can also be used as a formal, emphatic replacement for el que as the object of some prepositions. Moreover, it is often preferred to el que entirely in certain contexts. In non-defining clauses, the fact that it agrees for gender and number can make it clearer to what it refers. The fact that it cannot be used as the subject or direct object in defining clauses also makes it clear that a defining clause is not intended:

- Los niños y sus madres, las cuales eran de Valencia, me impresionaron = "The children and their mothers, who were from Valencia, impressed me" (los cuales would have referred to the children as well and not just their mothers)

When used as a personal direct object, personal a must be used:

- Esa persona, a la cual conozco yo muy bien, no es de fiar = "That person, whom I know very well, is not to be trusted"

In such situations as well as with the object of monosyllabic prepositions, the use of el cual is generally purely a matter of high style. This is used sparingly in Spanish, and foreigners should thus avoid over-using it:

- Es el asunto al cual se refería usted = "It is the matter to which you were referring"

In more everyday style, this might be phrased as:

- Es el asunto al que te referías = "It is the matter to which you were referring"

After multisyllabic prepositions and prepositional phrases (a pesar de, debajo de, a causa de, etc.), however, el cual is often preferred entirely:

- Un régimen bajo el cual es imposible vivir = "A régime under which it is impossible to live"
- Estas cláusulas, sin perjuicio de las cuales... = "These clauses, notwithstanding which..."

El cual is further generally preferred entirely when, as the object of a preposition, it is separated from its antecedent by intervening words. The more words that intervene, the more the use of el cual is practically obligatory:

- Es un billete con el que se puede viajar [...] pero por el cual se paga sólo dos euros = "It is a ticket with which you can travel [...] but for which you pay just two euros"

==== Cual ====
The bare form cual is used as the relative adjective ("in which sense", "with which people", etc.), which only inflects for number:

- en cual caso = "in which case"
- a cual tiempo = "at which time"
- cuales cosas = "which things"

=== Quien ===
The pronoun quien comes from the Latin qvem, "whom", the accusative of qvis, "who".

It too can replace [el] que in certain circumstances. Like the English pronouns "who" and "whom", it can only be used to refer to people.

It is invariable for gender, and was originally invariable for number. However, by analogy with other words, the form quienes was invented. Quien as a plural form survives as an archaism that is now considered non-standard.

==== For subjects ====
It can represent a subject. In this case, it is rather formal and is largely restricted to non-defining clauses.

Unlike el cual, it does not inflect for gender, but it does inflect for number, and it also specifies that it does refer to a person:

- Los niños con sus mochilas, quienes eran de Valencia, me impresionaron = "The children with their rucksacks, who were from Valencia, impressed me" (the use of quienes makes it clear that los niños is referred to; que could refer to the rucksacks, the children, or both, los cuales would refer to either the children or both, and las cuales would refer only to the rucksacks)

==== As the object of a preposition ====
Quien is particularly common as the object of a preposition when the clause is non-defining, but is also possible in defining clauses:

- Ella es la persona a quien le di el dinero = "She is the person to whom I gave the money"
- José, gracias a quien tengo el dinero, es muy generoso = "José, thanks to whom I have the money, is very generous"

=== Donde, a donde, como and cuando ===
Donde is ultimately from a combination of the obsolete adverb onde ("whence" or "from where") and the preposition de. Onde is from Latin unde, which also meant "whence" or "from where", and over the centuries it lost the "from" meaning and came to mean just "where". This meant that, to say "whence" or "where from", the preposition de had to be added, and this gave d'onde. The meaning of d'onde once again eroded over time until it came to mean just "where", and prepositions therefore had to be added once more. This gave rise to the modern usage of donde for "where" and a donde for "to where", among others. Note that all this means that, etymologically speaking, de donde is the rather redundant "from from from where", and a donde is the rather contradictory "to from from where". This tendency goes even further with the vulgar form ande (from adonde), which is often used to mean "where" as well. In the Ladino dialect of Spanish, the pronoun onde is still used, where donde still means "whence" or "where from", and in Latin America, isolated communities and rural areas retain this as well.

Como is from quomodo, "how", the ablative of qui modus, "what way".

Cuando is from quando, "when".

==== Location and movement ====
Donde can be used instead of other relative pronouns when location is referred to. Adonde is a variant that can be used when motion to the location is intended:

- El lugar en que/en el que/en el cual/donde estoy = "The place where I am"/"The place in which I am"
- Voy a[l lugar] donde está él = Voy al lugar en el que está él = "I am going [to the place] where he is"
- Iré [al lugar] adonde me lleven = Iré al lugar al que me lleven = "I will go wherever they take me"/"I will go to whatever place to which they take me"

==== Manner ====
Como can be used instead of other relative pronouns when manner is referred to:

- La forma/manera en que/en la que/como reaccionasteis = "The way that/in which/how you reacted" (en que is the most common and natural, like "that" or the null pronoun in English; but como is possible, as "how" is in English)

Note that mismo tends to require que:

- Lo dijo del mismo modo que lo dije yo = "She said it the same way [that] I did"

==== Time ====
Cuando tends to replace the use of other relative pronouns when time is referred to, usually in non-defining clauses.

Non-defining

- En agosto, cuando la gente tiene vacaciones, la ciudad estará vacía = "In August, when people have their holidays, the town will be empty"

Defining

- Sólo salgo los días [en] que no trabajo = "I only go out the days that I am not working"

Note that just que, or at the most en que, is normal with defining clauses referring to time. En el que and cuando are rarer.

=== Cuyo ===
"Cuyo" is the formal Spanish equivalent for the English pronoun "whose". However, "cuyo" inflects for gender and number (cuyos m. pl., cuya f. sg., or cuyas f. pl.) according to the word it precedes. For example:

- Alejandro es un estudiante cuyas calificaciones son siempre buenas = "Alejandro is a student whose grades are always good"

"cuyo" in this example has changed to "cuyas" in order to match the condition of the following word, "calificaciones" f. pl.

In Old Spanish there were interrogative forms, cúyo, cúya, cúyos, and cúyas, which are no longer used. ¿De quién...? is used instead.

In practice, cuyo is reserved to formal language. A periphrasis like Alejandro es un estudiante que tiene unas calificaciones siempre buenas is more common. Alejandro es un estudiante que sus calificaciones son siempre buenas (example of quesuismo) can also be found even if disapproved by prescriptivists.

Cuyo is from cvivs, the genitive (possessive) form of qvi.

=== Notes on relative and interrogative pronouns ===
Relative pronouns often have corresponding interrogative pronouns. For example:

- ¿Qué es esto? = "What is this?"

Ese es el libro que me diste = "That's the book that you gave me"

In the second line, que helps to answer what qué was asking for, a definition of "this".

Below is a list of interrogative pronouns and phrases with the relative pronouns that go with them:

- qué – what, que – that, which
- quién – who, whom (after prepositions), quien – who, whom (after prepositions)

- a quién – whom (direct object), to whom, a quien – whom (direct object), to whom
- de quién – whose, of whom, cuyo – whose, of whom
