= Spanish determiners =

Grammatical determiners in the Spanish language

The Spanish language uses determiners in a similar way to English. The main differences are that Spanish determiners inflect for gender (masculine/feminine, with some instances of vestigial neuter) and always inflect for number as well.

== Demonstrative determiners ==
Spanish has three kinds of demonstrative, whose use typically depends on the distance (physical or metaphorical) between the speaker and the described entity, or sometimes depends on the proximity to the three grammatical persons.

Demonstratives	Proximal	Medial	Distal
Masculine singular	este	ese	aquel
Masculine plural	estos	esos	aquellos
Feminine singular	esta	esa	aquella
Feminine plural	estas	esas	aquellas

Old English also used to have a three-way system: "this hill (here)", "that hill (there)" or "yon hill (yonder)" — in Spanish, "esta colina", "esa colina", "aquella colina". Standard English lost the third level, so that the "that, there" series covers the ground of "yon, yonder".

Este usually refers to something near the speaker (the first person). Ese usually refers to something nearer the listener (the second person). Aquel usually refers to something away from both the speaker and the listener.

The demonstrative determiners can also be used as pronouns, with the addition of the neutral singular forms esto, eso, aquello.

A similar three-way system of demonstratives is found in Portuguese, in Slavic languages, in Japanese and in Turkish.

== Articles ==
=== Definite article ===
The definite article in Spanish, corresponding to "the", is el. It inflects for gender and number as follows:

Articles
	Definite	
	Singular	Plural
Masculine	el	los
Feminine	la	las
Neuter	lo	—

Thus:

- el hombre = "[the] man"
- los hombres = "[the] men"
- la mujer = "[the] woman"
- las mujeres = "[the] women"

The usually-masculine form el is used instead of la before feminine nouns that begin with a stressed a (or rarely, au) sound (as well as, in principle, ai although such words are almost never found in practice):

- el águila (pequeña) = "the (small) eagle"
- el agua (fresca) = "the (fresh) water"
- el hacha (afilada) = "the (sharp) axe"
- el aula (vieja) = "the (old) classroom"

La is used, however, when el would imply a masculine noun:

- la ácrata (because el ácrata would be a male anarchist)
- la árabe (because el árabe would be a male Arab, or the Arabic language)

Feminine el is never used, however, before feminine adjectives that begin with a stressed a:

- la alta montaña = "the high mountain"
- la ancha calle = "the wide street"

Azúcar is a very special case. Its a- is unstressed, but it usually takes el even when feminine. In addition, azúcar can be of both genders in Spanish (other words with double gender are sal (salt), mar (sea) and sartén (frying pan)):

- el azúcar refinada (el azúcar refinado and la azúcar refinada are also acceptable)

Feminine el does not have the same origin as the masculine el. The latter is from the Old Castilian ele, but the former is from ela, just like la.

There is also a neuter article that is used before adjectives and makes them act like nouns:

- lo bueno = "the good, what is good"
- lo importante = "the important thing"
- lo indefinible = "the indefinable"
- lo desconocido = "the unknown"
- lo oscuro = "the dark"

=== Indefinite article ===
The indefinite article in Spanish, corresponding to "a/an", is un and inflects for gender and number as follows:

Articles
	Indefinite	
	Singular	Plural
Masculine	un	unos
Feminine	una	unas
Neuter	uno (Archaic)	—

Thus:

- un hombre = "a man"
- unos hombres = "some men"
- una mujer = "a woman"
- unas mujeres = "some women"

Near-synonyms of unos include unos cuantos, algunos and unos pocos.

The same rules that apply to feminine el apply to una and un:

- un ala = "a wing"
- una árabe = "a female Arab"
- una alta montaña = "a high mountain"

As in English, the plural indefinite article is not always required:

- Hay [unas] cosas en la mesa = "There are [some] things on the table"

The use of uno/una/unos/unas before adjectives can be analyzed as a pronoun, followed by an adjective, rather than as an indefinite article, followed by a nominalized adjective:

- Uno bueno = "A good [one]": "Hay uno bueno en esa calle, en la Plaza Corbetta." = "There's a good one on that street, on Corbetta Square."
- Uno importante = "An important [one]": "Hay uno importante en el centro del Océano Pacífico." = "There is a major one in the center of the Pacific Ocean."

== Possessive determiners ==
These are often known as possessive or genitive determiners. They are used before the noun referring to what is possessed (and before the rest of the whole noun phrase, for example when an adjective precedes the noun). They inflect for number and in some cases gender as well.

Possessive determiners
Possessor		Possessed			
Possessor		Singular		Plural	
Possessor		Masculine	Feminine	Masculine	Feminine
Singular	1st-person	mi		mis	
Singular	2nd-person	tu		tus	
Singular	3rd-person	su		sus	
Plural	1st-person	nuestro	nuestra	nuestros	nuestras
Plural	2nd-person	vuestro	vuestra	vuestros	vuestras
Plural	3rd-person	su		sus	

For example:

- Este es mi perro = "This is my dog"
- Esta es tu camisa = "This is your shirt"
- Estos son nuestros libros = "These are our books"
- Estas son sus casas = "These are his/her/your/their houses"

Given the ambiguous meaning of "su/s", this is often avoided, and replaced by other forms that clearly state who owns the thing in question. So sentences like the following can be heard:

- la casa de él = "his house" (lit. "the house of him")
- la casa de ella = "her house" (lit. "the house of her")
- la casa de ellos = "their house" (lit. "the house of them" i.e.: the house has more than one owner, and at least one of them is a man)
- la casa de usted = "your house" (lit. "the house of you" (one possessor))

Or even:

- su casa de usted = "your house" (lit. "your house of you" (one possessor))
- su casa de ustedes = "your house" (lit. "your house of you" (more than one possessor))

Note the following:

- There is no distinction according to the number (or gender) of possessors for the third person possessives (i.e. between "his/her/its" and "their").
- The possessive for usted and ustedes is su(s) as for other third-person pronouns. The ambiguity that this causes (especially considering that su(s) already covers "his", "her", "its" and "their") can be alleviated by treating usted(es) as a noun and thereby saying la casa de ustedes instead of su casa. It is also possible to disambiguate by saying la casa de él or la casa de ella, etc.

Dialectal variation:

- The archaic pronoun vos has the possessive form vuestro, just like vosotros does. However, in modern dialectal voseo, tu is the possessive corresponding to vos. Therefore, an Argentinian would say Che, decime tu dirección and never decime vuestra dirección or dime tu dirección.
- Dialectally, usted/ustedes may replace tú/vosotros without any intention to be formal. The corresponding possessive determiner su(s) is used. Therefore, a Colombian may say Hijo, enséñeme sus deberes instead of Hijo, enséñame tus deberes ("Son, show me your homework").

=== Combining demonstratives and possessives ===
Demonstrative pronouns can be combined with possessives as follows:

- Esta nuestra tierra = "This Earth of ours"
- Este mi amor = "This love of mine"

Strictly speaking, the presence of the first determiner means that the possessive must be interpreted as an adjective rather than a determiner. Note however that the long adjectival form (mío, tuyo, suyo, etc.), which is identical to the corresponding possessive pronoun, is not used in this construction, which is rather uncommon.

It is also possible to use the long adjectival form. In this case, it goes after the noun:

- Esta tierra nuestra = "This Earth of ours"
- Este amor mío = "This love of mine"

== Miscellaneous determiners ==
There are many more words that can be used as determiners in Spanish. They mostly end in -o and have the usual four forms (-o, -a, -os, -as) to agree with the noun.

- ¡Otra cerveza, por favor! = "Another beer, please!"
- Mucha gente pasa por aquí = "Many people pass through here"
- No hay tanta gente como en verano = "There are not as many people as in summer"
- Ciertos vinos son muy dulces = "Certain wines are very sweet"
- He salido con varias chicas = "I have gone out with several girls"
- Hay demasiados platos = “There are too many dishes”
