= Spain =

Country in Southern and Western Europe

Kingdom of Spain Reino de España (Spanish)
- Flag Coat of arms
- Motto: Plus ultra (Latin) (English: 'Further Beyond')
- Anthem: Marcha Real (Spanish) (English: 'Royal March')
- Location of Spain (dark green) – in Europe (green & dark grey) – in the European Union (green)
- Capital and largest city: Madrid; 40°26′N 3°42′W
- Official languages: Spanish
- Recognised regional languages: Aranese; Basque; Catalan or Valencian (Note: Valencian is the official name used in the Valencian Community for the Romance language also known as Catalan.); Galician; (Note: Spain shares co-official regional languages with Spanish (Castilian) in several autonomous communities. These unique linguistic rights are protected under the Spanish Constitution and regional statutes of autonomy.)
- Ethnic groups (2026): 85.2% Spaniards; 14.8% other
- Religion (2026): 54.5% Roman Catholicism; 36.3% non-practicing Catholic; 18.2% practicing Catholic; 15.3% atheist; 13.4% agnostic; 12% indifferent or irreligious; 3% other religion; 1.7% unanswered
- Demonyms: Spaniard; Spanish
- Government: Unitary parliamentary constitutional monarchy
  - Monarch: Felipe VI
  - Prime Minister: Pedro Sánchez
  - President of the Congress of Deputies: Francina Armengol
  - President of the Senate: Pedro Rollán
- Legislature: Cortes Generales
  - Upper house: Senate
  - Lower house: Congress of Deputies

Formation
  - Dynastic union: 20 January 1479
  - Sole sovereign: 14 March 1516
  - Centralised state: 9 June 1715
  - First constitution: 19 March 1812
  - Current constitution: 29 December 1978

Area
  - Total: 506,030 km^{2} (195,380 sq mi) (50th)
  - Water (%): 0.89

Population
  - October 2026 census: ▲49,935,642
  - Density: 98/km^{2} (253.8/sq mi) (116th)
- GDP (PPP): 2026 estimate
  - Total: ▲$2.978 trillion (15th)
  - Per capita: ▲$59,187 (35th)
- GDP (nominal): 2026 estimate
  - Total: ▲$2.091 trillion (14th)
  - Per capita: ▲$41,563 (32nd)
- Gini (2024): ▼31.2 medium inequality
- HDI (2023): ▲0.918 very high (28th)
- Currency: Euro (Note: The Peseta before 2002) (€) (EUR)
- Time zone: UTC±0 to +1 (WET and CET)
  - Summer (DST): UTC+1 to +2 (WEST and CEST)
- Note: most of Spain observes CET/CEST, except the Canary Islands which observe WET/WEST.
- Date format: DD/MM/YYYY
- Calling code: +34
- ISO 3166 code: ES
- Internet TLD: .es (Note: The .eu domain is also used, as it is shared with other European Union member states. Also, the .cat domain is used in Catalonia, .gal in Galicia and .eus in the Basque-Country autonomous regions.)

Spain, (Note: Spanish: España, [esˈpaɲa]) officially the Kingdom of Spain, (Note: Spanish: Reino de España) is a country in Southern and Western Europe with territories in North Africa. (Note: See List of transcontinental countries.) Featuring the southernmost point of continental Europe, it is the largest country in Southern Europe and the fourth-most populous European Union (EU) member state. Spanning the majority of the Iberian Peninsula, its territory also includes the Canary Islands, in the Eastern Atlantic Ocean; the Balearic Islands, in the Western Mediterranean Sea; and the autonomous cities of Ceuta and Melilla, in mainland Africa. Spain is bordered to the north by France, Andorra, and the Bay of Biscay; to the east and south by the Mediterranean Sea, Gibraltar and Morocco (the latter being through its exclaves of Ceuta, Melilla and Peñón de Vélez de la Gomera in North Africa); and to the west by Portugal and the Atlantic Ocean. Spain's capital and largest city is Madrid; other major urban areas include Barcelona, Valencia, Zaragoza, Seville, Bilbao, Málaga, Murcia, Palma de Mallorca and Las Palmas.

In early antiquity, the Iberian Peninsula was inhabited by Iberians, Celts, and other pre-Roman peoples. The Roman conquest of the Iberian Peninsula created the province of Hispania, which became deeply Romanised and later Christianised. After the fall of the Western Roman Empire, the peninsula was conquered by tribes from Central Europe, among them the Visigoths, who established the Visigothic Kingdom centred on Toledo. In the early 8th century, most of the peninsula was conquered by the Umayyad Caliphate, with Al-Andalus centred on Córdoba. The northern Christian kingdoms of Iberia launched the so-called Reconquista, gradually repelling and ultimately expelling Islamic rule from the peninsula, culminating with the fall of the Nasrid Kingdom of Granada. The dynastic union of the Crown of Castile and the Crown of Aragon in 1479 under the Catholic Monarchs is often seen as the de facto unification of Spain as a nation state.

During the Age of Discovery, Spain led the exploration and conquest of the New World, completed the first circumnavigation of the globe, and established one of the largest empires in history, which fostered a global trade system driven by precious metals. The Spanish Empire was ruled by the Habsburg and Bourbon dynasties, from 1516 to 1700 and from 1700 onward, respectively. In the 18th century, the Nueva Planta decrees centralised Spain under the Bourbons, strengthening royal authority. The 19th century witnessed the victorious Peninsular War (1808–1814) against Napoleonic forces and the loss of most American colonies amid liberal–absolutist conflicts. These struggles culminated in the Spanish Civil War (1936–1939) and the Francoist dictatorship (1939–1975). With the restoration of democracy and entry into the EU, Spain experienced a major economic boom and social transformation.

Spain is a secular parliamentary democracy and a constitutional monarchy, with King Felipe VI as head of state. A developed country, it has a high nominal GDP per capita globally and an advanced economy that ranks among the largest in the world and the fourth-largest in the EU. Spain is the second country by tourism destination and hosts 50 UNESCO World Heritage Sites, the fifth-largest number per country. The official language at the national level is Spanish, the world's second-most spoken native language, although other regional languages also have official status in their respective autonomous communities.

== Etymology ==
The name of Spain (España) comes from Hispania, the name used by the Ancient Romans for the Iberian Peninsula during the Roman Republic and the Roman Empire. The etymology of the term Hispania remains uncertain.

The Phoenicians referred to the region as i-shphan-im, possibly meaning 'land of rabbits or hyraxes', 'land of metals', or 'northern island'. Roman coins struck in the region from the reign of Hadrian show a female figure with a rabbit at her feet, and Strabo called it the 'land of the rabbits'.

== History ==
=== Prehistory and Iberian peoples ===
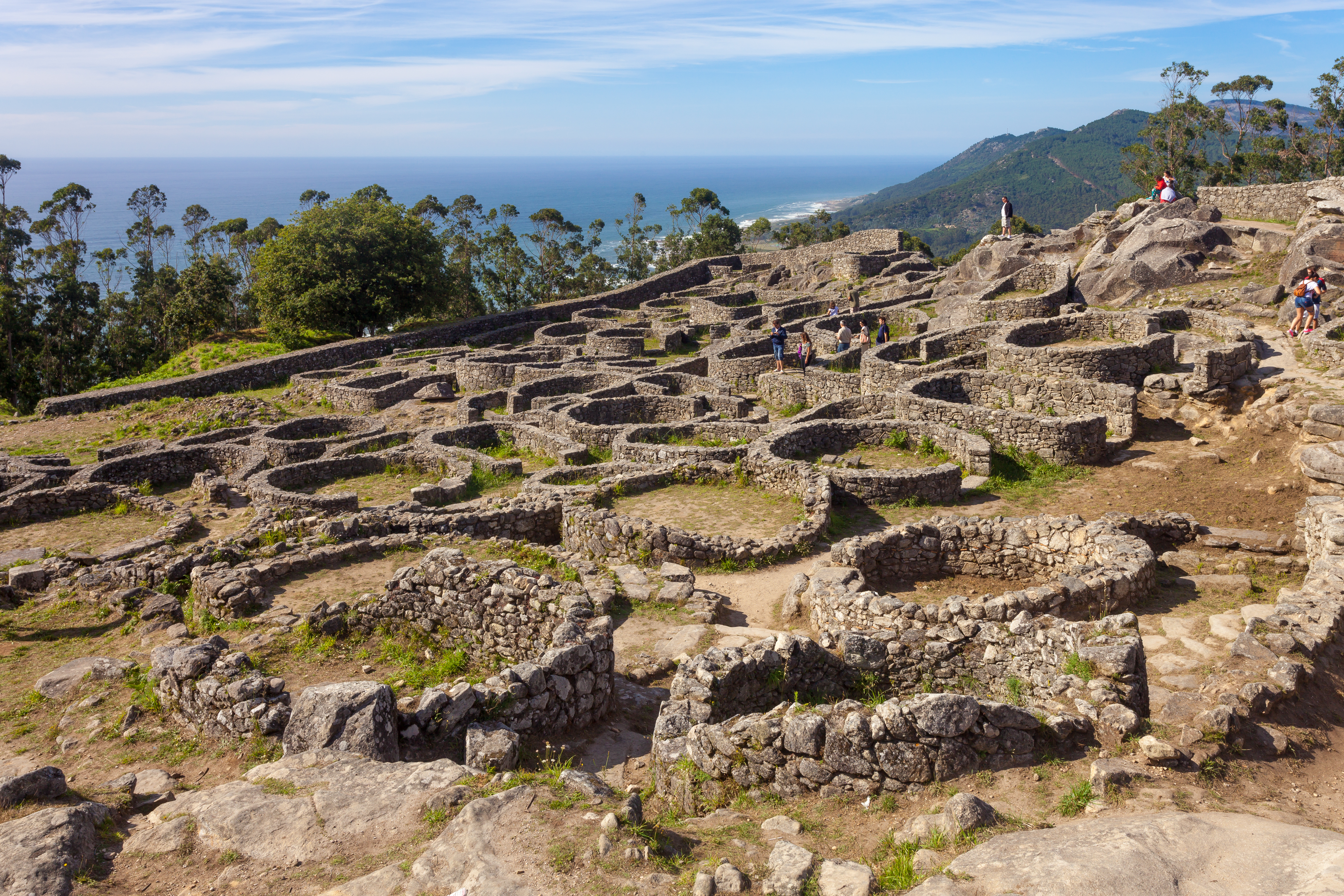
Celtic castro in Galicia

Archaeological research at Atapuerca indicates the Iberian Peninsula was populated by hominids 1.3 million years ago. The Iberian Peninsula was one of the last regions of Europe where Neanderthals persisted during the expansion of modern humans, with Neanderthal populations surviving in parts of Iberia until around 40,000 years ago.

Modern humans had reached northern Iberia by around 42,000 years ago, as indicated by the appearance of the Aurignacian in the region. The best-known artefacts of these prehistoric human settlements are the paintings in the Altamira cave of Cantabria in northern Iberia, which were created from 35,600 to 13,500 BC by Cro-Magnon. Archaeological and genetic evidence suggests that the Iberian Peninsula acted as one of several major refugia from which northern Europe was repopulated following the end of the last ice age. Around 2500–2000 BC, the immigration of Bell Beaker-associated populations led to a major genetic replacement of earlier Neolithic populations in the Iberian Peninsula.

Before the Roman conquest the major cultures along the Mediterranean coast were the Iberians, the Celts in the interior and north-west, the Lusitanians in the west, and the Tartessians in the southwest. The seafaring Phoenicians, Carthaginians, and Greeks successively established trading settlements along the eastern and southern coast. The development of writing in the peninsula took place after the arrival of early Phoenician settlers and traders, tentatively dated 9th century BC or later.

The south of the peninsula was rich in archaic Phoenician colonies, unmatched by any other region in the central-western Mediterranean. They were small and densely packed settlements. The colony of Gadir—which sustained strong links with its metropolis of Tyre—stood out from the rest of the network of colonies, also featuring a more complex sociopolitical organization. Archaic Greeks arrived on the Peninsula by the late 7th century BC. They founded Greek colonies such as Emporion (570 BC).

After the defeat of Carthage in the First Punic War, the Carthaginian general Hamilcar Barca led an expedition to Iberia, where he hoped to gain a new empire for Carthage to compensate for territorial losses. In eight years, by force of arms and diplomacy, Hamilcar secured an extensive territory, covering around half of the Iberian Peninsula. Hamilcar's premature death in battle (228 BC) prevented him from completing the conquest of the Iberian Peninsula.

=== Roman Hispania and the Visigothic Kingdom ===
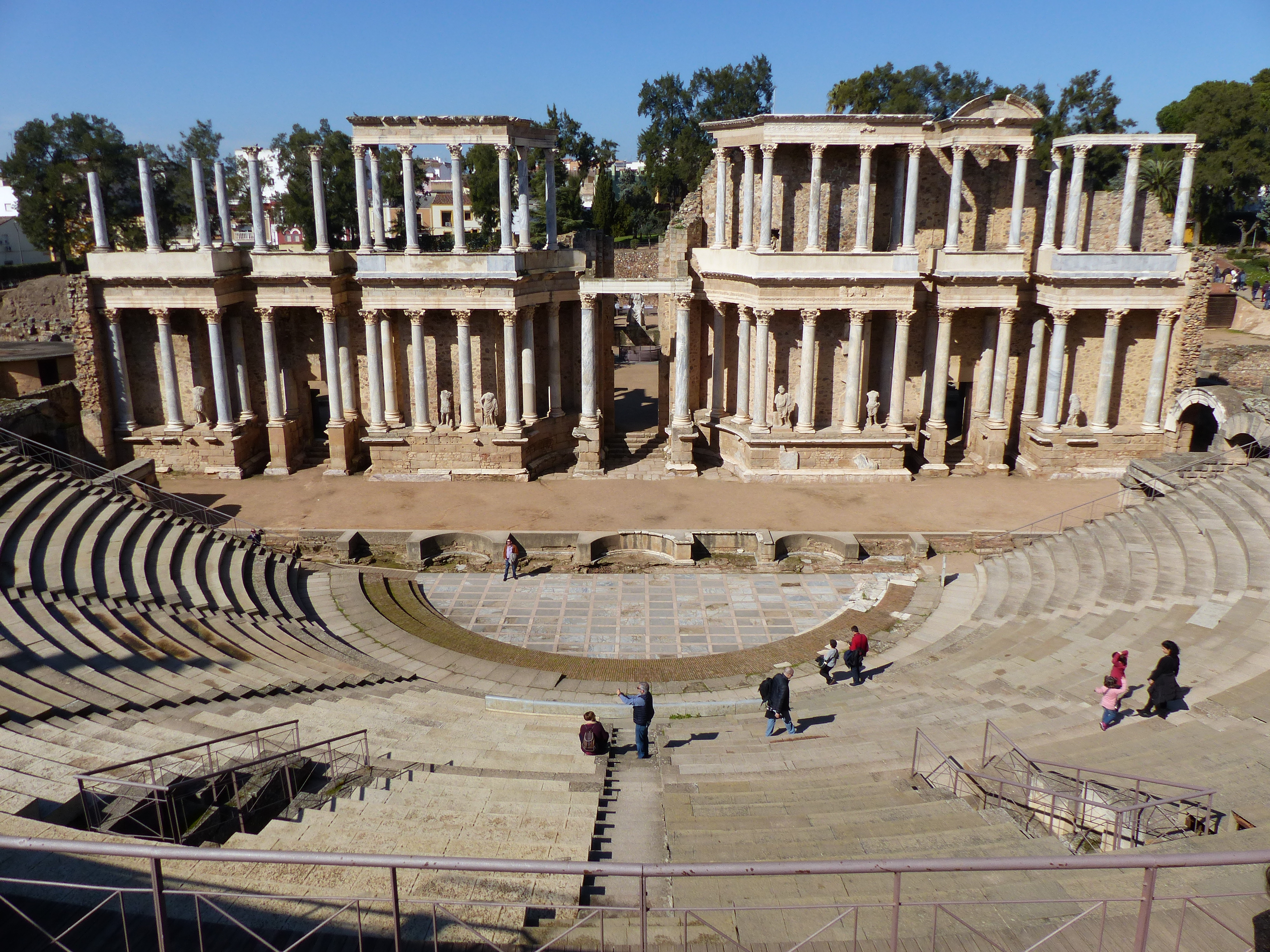
The Roman Theatre in Mérida

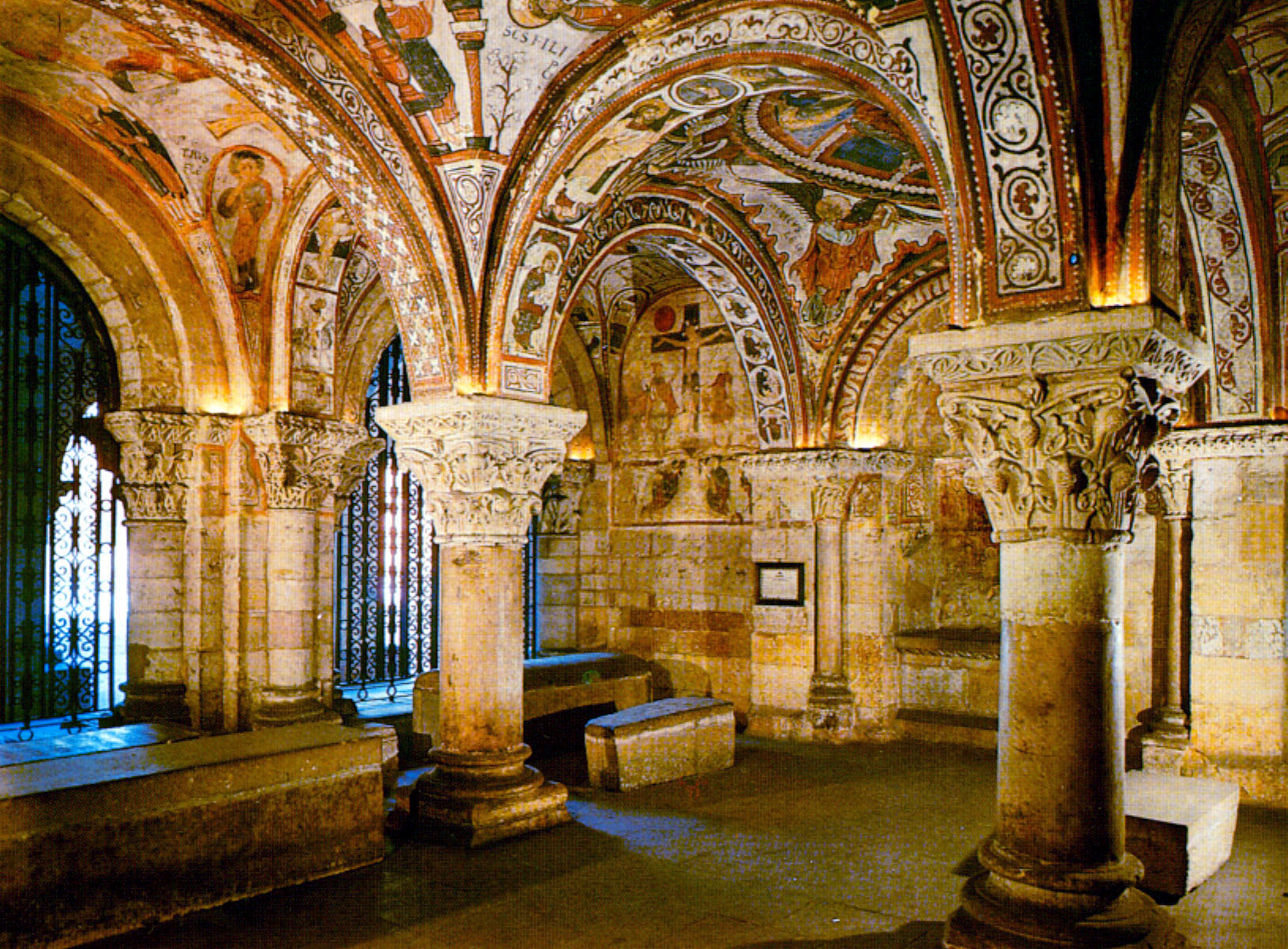
Royal Pantheon of San Isidoro, Kingdom of León

During the Second Punic War, roughly between 210 and 205 BC, the expanding Roman Republic captured Carthaginian trading colonies along the Mediterranean coast. It took the Romans nearly two centuries to complete the conquest of the Iberian Peninsula. They retained control of it for over six centuries. Roman rule was bound together by law, language, and the Roman road. The cultures of the pre-Roman populations were gradually Romanised (Latinised) at different rates depending on what part of the peninsula they lived in, with local leaders being admitted into the Roman aristocratic class. (Note: The latifundia (sing., latifundium), large estates controlled by the aristocracy, were superimposed on the existing Iberian landholding system.)

Hispania, the Roman name for the Iberian Peninsula, served as a granary for the Roman market, and its harbours exported gold, wool, olive oil, and wine. Agricultural production increased with the introduction of irrigation projects, some of which remain in use. Emperors Hadrian, Trajan, Theodosius I, and the philosopher Seneca were born in Hispania. (Note: The poets Martial, Quintilian and Lucan were also born in Hispania.) Christianity was introduced into Hispania in the 1st century AD, and it became popular in the cities in the 2nd century. Most of Spain's present languages and religions, as well as the basis of its laws, originate from this period. Starting in 170 AD, incursions of North-African Mauri in the province of Baetica took place.

The Germanic Suebi and Vandals, together with the Sarmatian Alans, entered the peninsula after 409, weakening the Western Roman Empire's jurisdiction over Hispania. The Suebi established a kingdom in north-western Iberia. The Vandals established themselves in the south of the peninsula by 420, before crossing over to North Africa in 429. As the western Roman Empire disintegrated, the social and economic base became greatly simplified. The successor regimes maintained many of the institutions and laws of the late empire, including Christianity and assimilation into the evolving Roman culture. The Byzantines established an occidental province, Spania, in the south, with the intention of reviving Roman rule throughout Iberia. Eventually Hispania was reunited under Visigothic rule.

=== Muslim era and Reconquista ===
From 711 to 718, as part of the expansion of the Umayyad Caliphate which had conquered North Africa from the Byzantine Empire, nearly all of the Iberian Peninsula was conquered by Muslims from across the Strait of Gibraltar, resulting in the collapse of the Visigothic Kingdom. Only a small area in the mountainous north of the peninsula stood out of the territory seized during the initial invasion. The Kingdom of Asturias-León consolidated upon this territory. Other Christian kingdoms, such as Navarre and Aragon in the mountainous north, eventually surged upon the consolidation of counties of the Carolingian Marca Hispanica. For several centuries, the fluctuating frontier between the Muslim and Christian-controlled areas of the peninsula was along the Ebro and Douro valleys.

Conversion to Islam proceeded at an increasing pace. The muladíes (Muslims of ethnic Iberian origin) are believed to have formed the majority of the population of Al-Andalus by the end of the 10th century. A series of Viking incursions raided the coasts of the Iberian Peninsula in the 9th and 10th centuries. In the 11th century, the Caliphate of Córdoba collapsed, fracturing into a series of petty kingdoms (Taifas), often subject to the payment of a form of protection money (Parias) to the Northern Christian kingdoms, which otherwise undertook a southward territorial expansion. The capture of Toledo in 1085 marked a significant shift in the balance of power in favour of the Christian kingdoms. The arrival from North Africa of the Islamic ruling sects of the Almoravids and the Almohads achieved temporary unity upon the Muslim-ruled territory, with a stricter, less tolerant application of Islam, and partially reversed some Christian territorial gains.

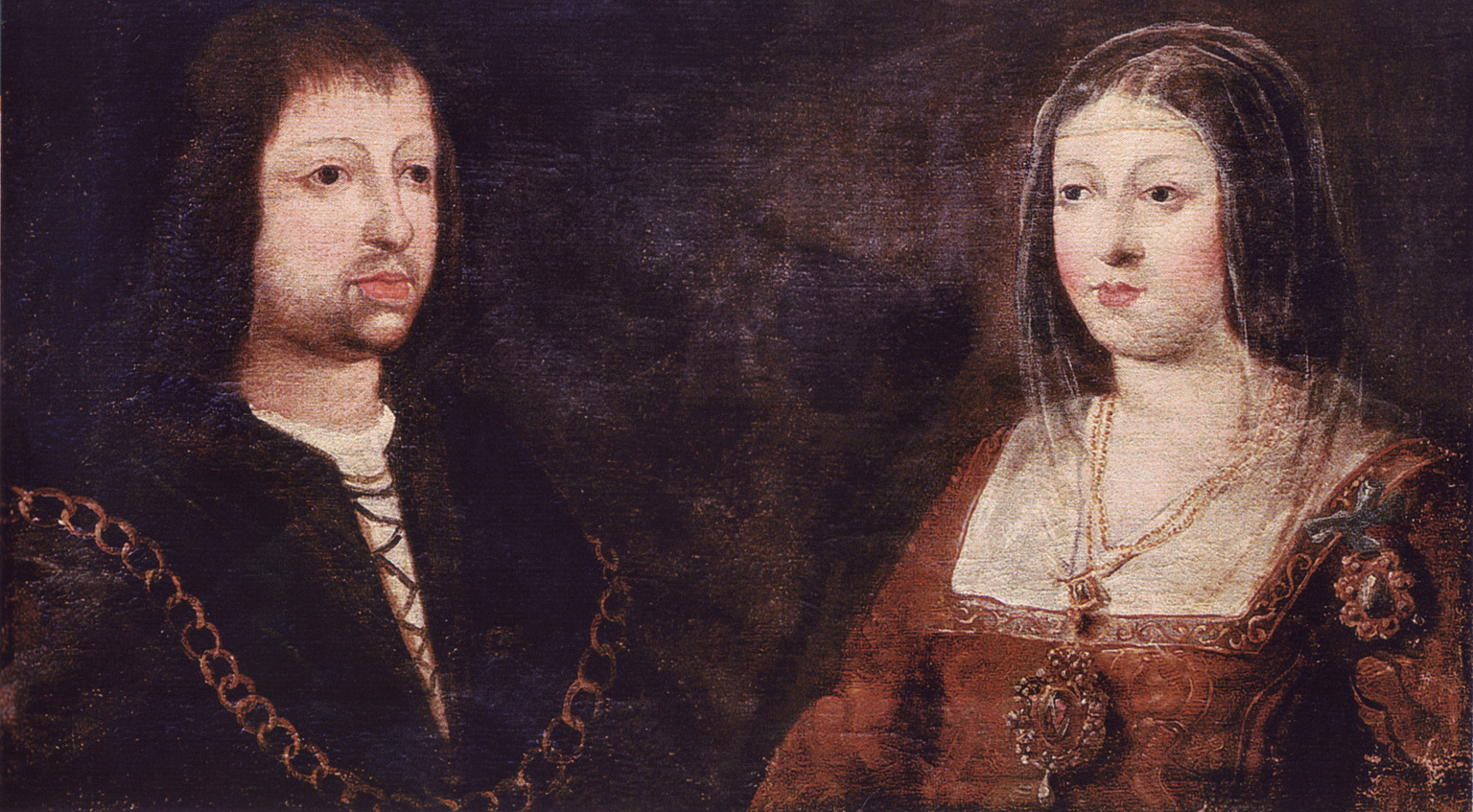
Catholic Monarchs of Spain

The Kingdom of León was the strongest Christian kingdom for centuries. In 1188, a form of modern parliamentary session was held in León (Cortes of León), restricted to the bishops, the magnates, and 'the elected citizens of each city'. The Kingdom of Castile, formed from Leonese territory, was its successor as the strongest kingdom. The kings and the nobility fought for power and influence in this period. The example of the Roman emperors influenced the political objective of the Crown, while the nobles benefited from feudalism.

Muslim strongholds in the Guadalquivir Valley such as Córdoba (1236) and Seville (1248) fell to Castile in the 13th century. The County of Barcelona and the Kingdom of Aragon entered into a dynastic union and gained territory and power in the Mediterranean. In 1229, Mallorca was conquered, as was Valencia in 1238. In the 13th and 14th centuries, the North-African Marinids established some enclaves around the Strait of Gibraltar. Upon the conclusion of the Granada War, the Nasrid Sultanate of Granada (the remaining Muslim-ruled polity in the Iberian Peninsula after 1246) capitulated in 1492 to the military strength of the Catholic Monarchs, and it was integrated from then on in the Crown of Castile.

=== Spanish Empire ===
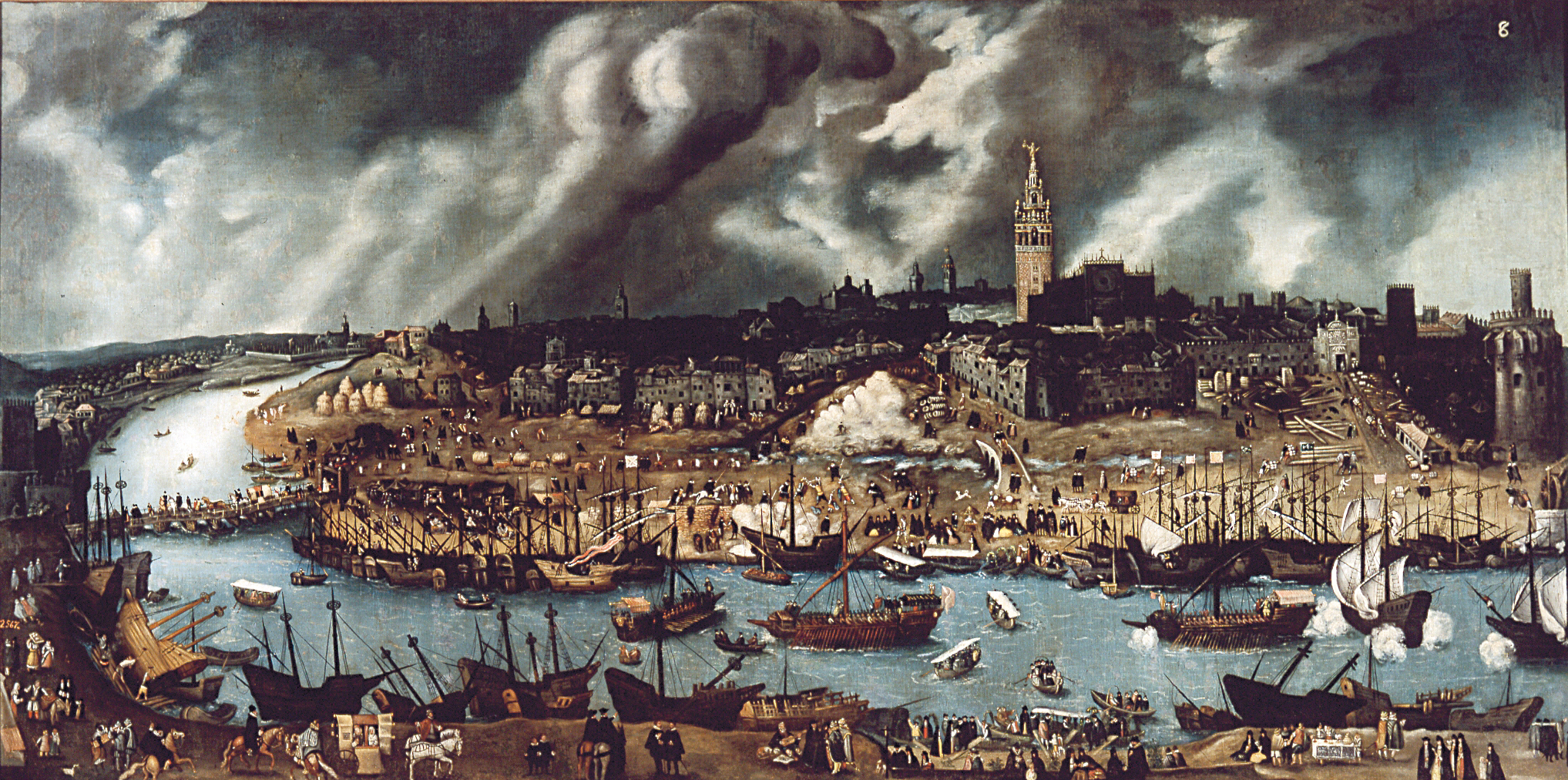
Late 16th-century Seville, the harbour enjoying the exclusive right to trade with the New World

In 1469, the crowns of the Christian kingdoms of Castile and Aragon were united by the marriage of their monarchs, Isabella I and Ferdinand II, respectively. In 1492, as part of the Spanish Inquisition, Jews were forced to choose between conversion to Catholicism or expulsion; as many as 200,000 Jews were expelled from Castile and Aragon. The year 1492 also marked the arrival of Christopher Columbus in the New World, during a voyage funded by Isabella. Columbus's first voyage crossed the Atlantic and reached the Caribbean Islands, beginning the European exploration and conquest of the Americas.

The Treaty of Granada guaranteed religious tolerance towards Muslims, for a few years before Islam was outlawed in 1502 in Castile and 1527 in Aragon, leading the remaining Muslim population to become nominally Christian Moriscos. About four decades after the War of the Alpujarras (1568–1571), over 300,000 moriscos were expelled, settling primarily in North Africa.

A diachronic map of the Spanish Empire

The unification of the crowns of Aragon and Castile by the marriage of their sovereigns laid the basis for modern Spain and the Spanish Empire, although each kingdom of Spain remained a separate country socially, politically, legally, and in currency and language.

Habsburg Spain was one of the leading world powers throughout the 16th century and most of the 17th century, a position reinforced by trade and wealth from colonial possessions and became the world's leading maritime power. It reached its apogee during the reigns of the first two Spanish Habsburgs—Charles V/I (1516–1556) and Philip II (1556–1598). This period saw the Spanish conquest of the Aztec and Inca empires, the Italian Wars, the Schmalkaldic War, the Dutch Revolt, the War of the Portuguese Succession, clashes with the Ottomans, intervention in the French Wars of Religion, and the Anglo-Spanish War.

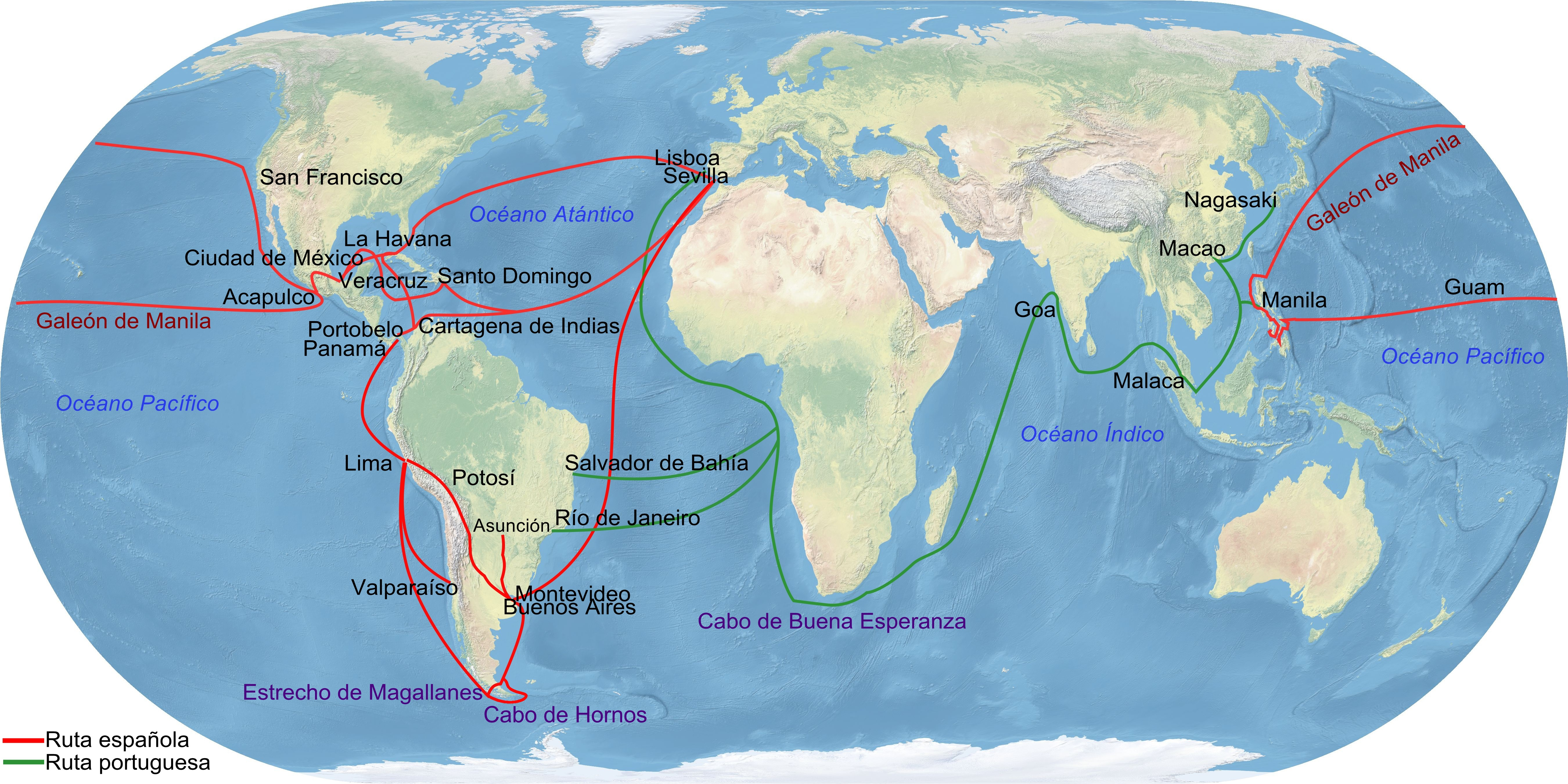
The main trade routes of the Spanish Empire

Through exploration and conquest or royal marriage alliances and inheritance, the Spanish Empire expanded across vast areas in the Americas, the Indo-Pacific, Africa as well as the European continent, including holdings in the Italian Peninsula, the Low Countries and the Franche-Comté. The so-called Age of Discovery featured explorations by sea and by land, the opening-up of new trade routes across oceans, conquests and the beginnings of European colonialism. Precious metals, spices, luxuries, and previously unknown plants brought to the metropole played a leading part in transforming the European understanding of the globe.

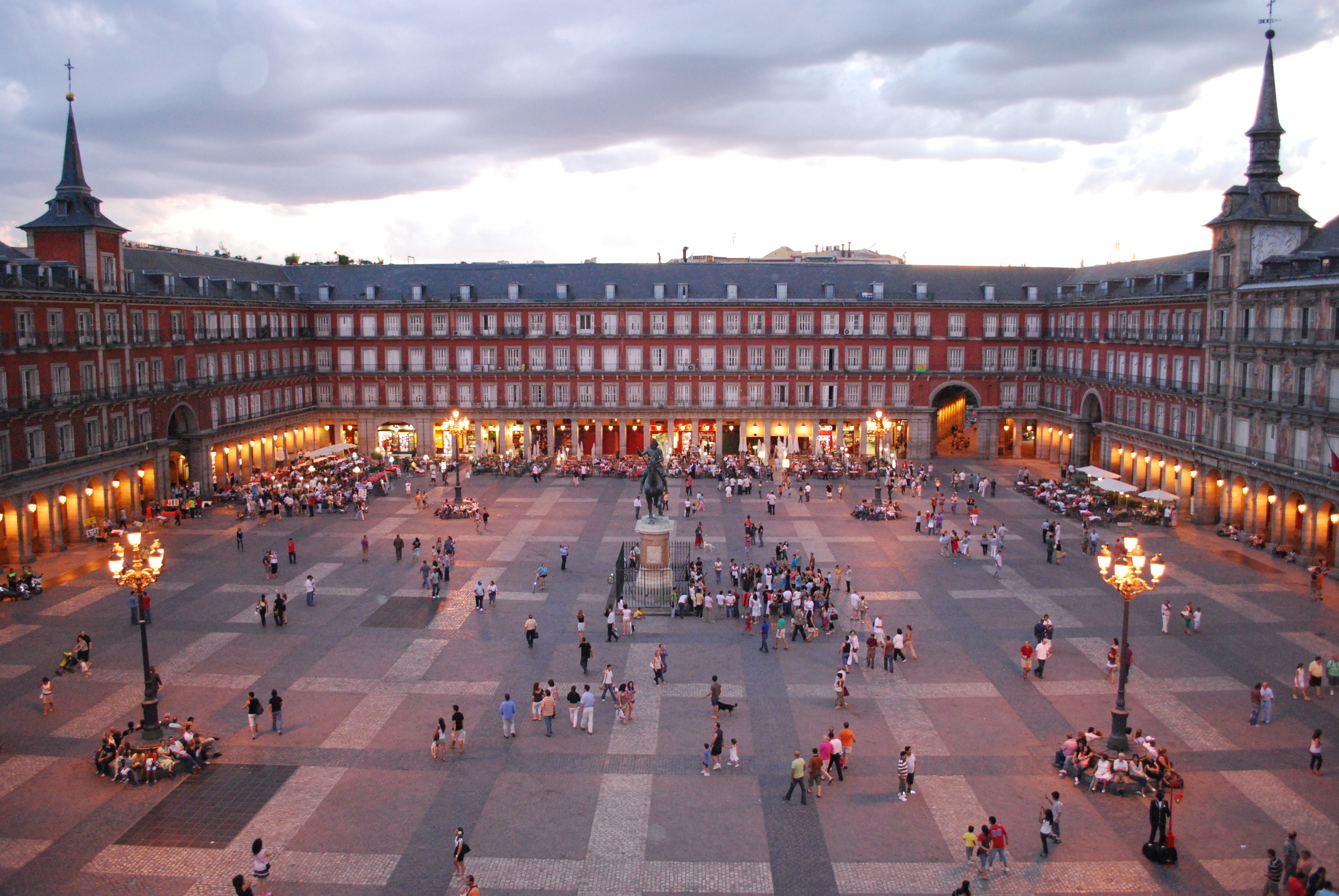
The Plaza Mayor of Madrid, built in 1619 during the reign of Philip III.

The cultural efflorescence witnessed during this period is now referred to as the Spanish Golden Age. The expansion of the empire caused immense upheaval in the Americas as the collapse of societies and empires and new diseases from Europe devastated American indigenous populations. The rise of humanism, the Counter-Reformation and new geographical discoveries and conquests raised issues that were addressed by the intellectual movement now known as the School of Salamanca, which developed the first modern theories of what are now known as international law and human rights.

Spain's 16th-century maritime supremacy was demonstrated by the victory over the Ottoman Empire at the Battle of Lepanto in 1571 and over Portugal at the Battle of Ponta Delgada in 1582, and then after the setback of the Spanish Armada in 1588, in a series of victories against England in the Anglo-Spanish War of 1585–1604. In the middle decades of the 17th century, Spain's maritime power went into a long decline with mounting defeats against the Dutch Republic (Battle of the Downs) and then England in the Anglo-Spanish War of 1654–1660. By the 1660s, Spain was struggling to defend its overseas possessions from pirates and privateers.

The Protestant Reformation increased Spain's involvement in religiously charged wars, forcing ever-expanding military efforts across Europe and in the Mediterranean. By the middle decades of a war- and plague-ridden 17th-century Europe, the Spanish Habsburgs had enmeshed Spain in continent-wide religious-political conflicts. These conflicts drained Spain of resources and undermined the economy generally. Spain managed to hold on to most of the scattered Habsburg empire, and help the imperial forces of the Holy Roman Empire reverse a large part of the advances made by Protestant forces.

Spain was finally forced to recognise the separation of Portugal and the United Provinces (Dutch Republic), and eventually suffered some serious military reverses to France in the latter stages of the immensely destructive, Europe-wide Thirty Years' War. In the latter half of the 17th century, Spain went into a gradual decline, during which it surrendered several small territories to France and England; however, it maintained and enlarged its vast overseas empire, which remained intact until the beginning of the 19th century.

==== 18th century ====
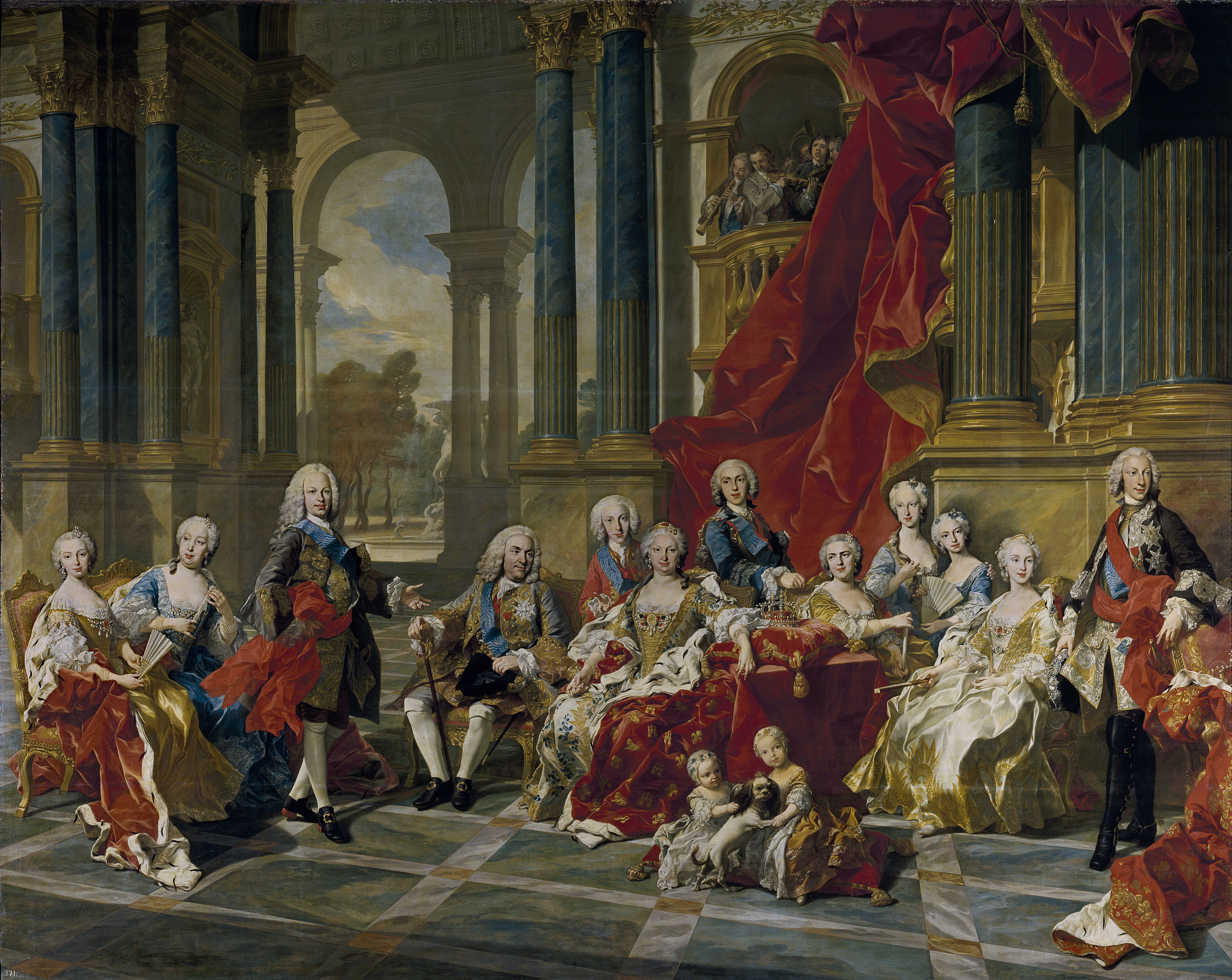
The family of Philip V. During the Enlightenment in Spain a new royal family reigned, the House of Bourbon.

The decline culminated in a controversy over succession to the throne, which consumed the first years of the 18th century. The War of the Spanish Succession was a wide-ranging international conflict combined with a civil war, and cost the kingdom its European possessions and its position as a leading European power.

During this war, a new dynasty originating in France, the Bourbons, was installed. The Crowns of Castile and Aragon had been long united only by the Monarchy and the common institution of the Inquisition's Holy Office. A number of reform policies, the so-called Bourbon Reforms, were pursued by the Monarchy with the overarching goal of centralised authority and administrative uniformity. They included the abolishment of many of the old regional privileges and laws, as well as the customs barrier between the Crowns of Aragon and Castile in 1717, followed by the introduction of new property taxes in the Aragonese kingdoms.

The 18th century saw a gradual recovery and an increase in prosperity through much of the Spanish empire. The predominant economic policy was interventionist, with the State driving infrastructure development, abolishing internal customs, and reducing export tariffs. Projects of agricultural colonisation with new settlements took place in the south of mainland Spain. Enlightenment ideas began to gain ground among some of the kingdom's elite and monarchy.

=== Liberalism and nation state ===
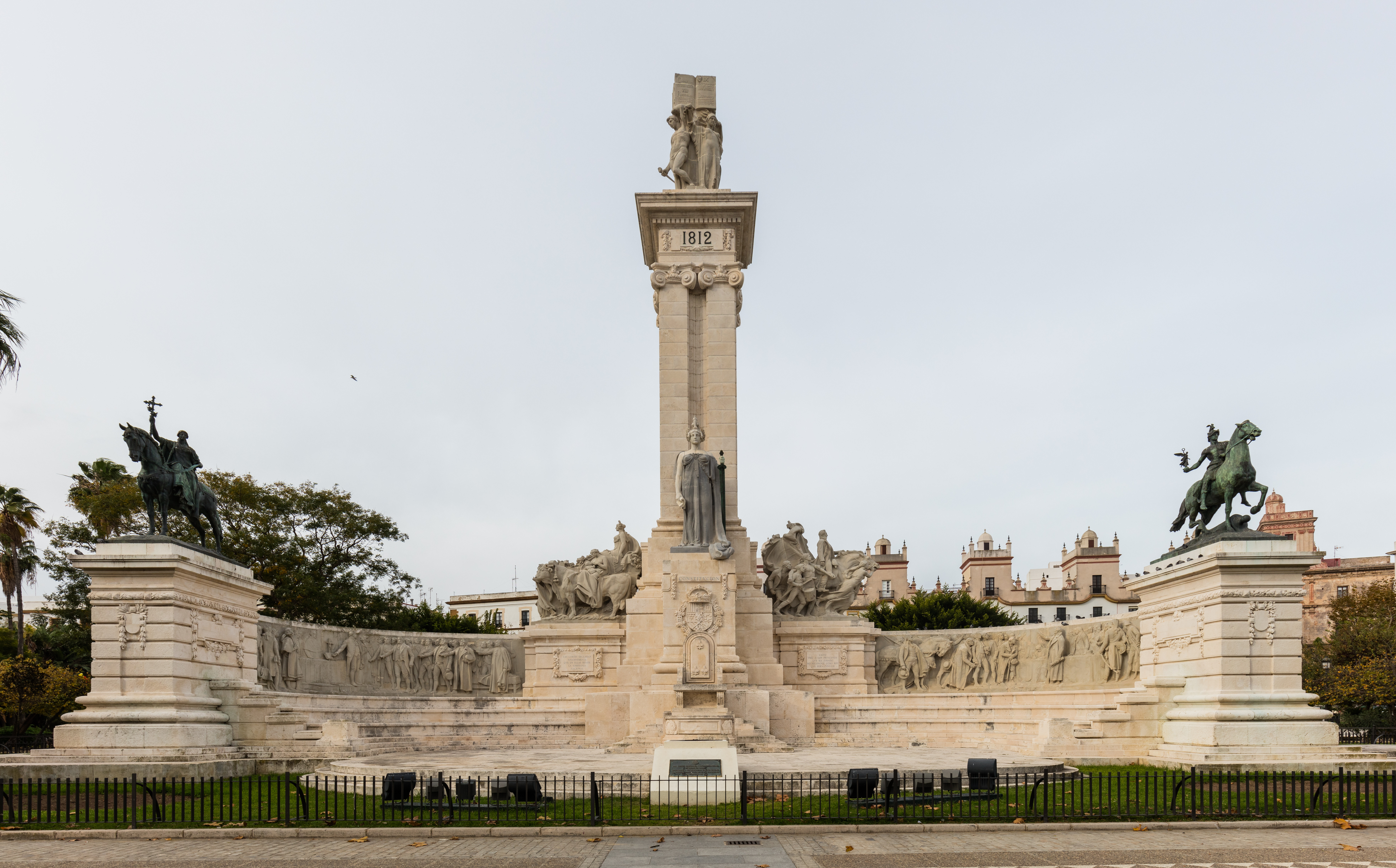
Monument to the Constitution of 1812 in Cádiz

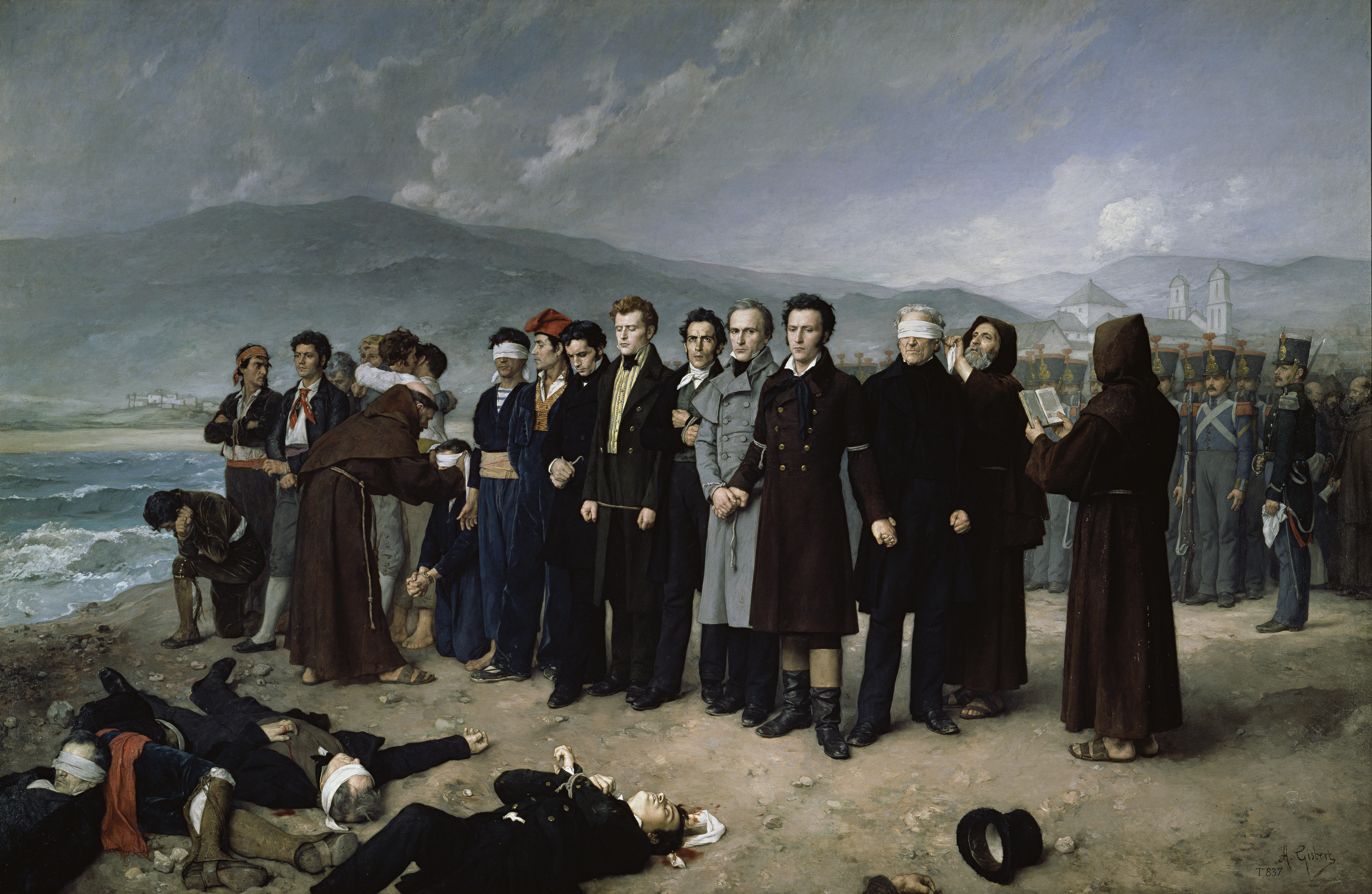
Execution of Torrijos and his men in 1831, Málaga. Ferdinand VII took repressive measures against the liberal forces in his country.

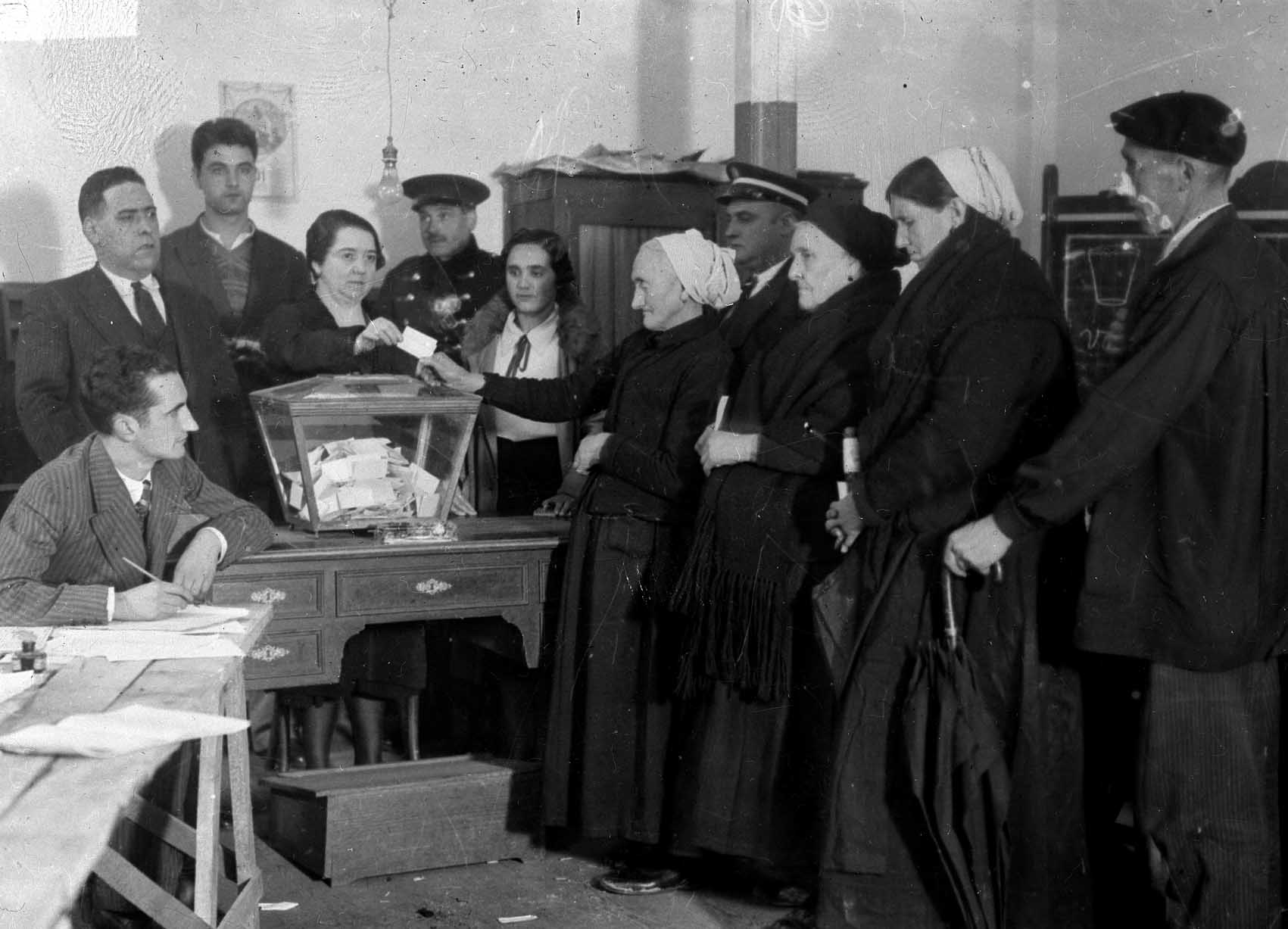
Women voting in Éibar in 1933, after women's suffrage was approved. Deputy Clara Campoamor was a key figure for the right to be granted.

In 1793, Spain went to war against the revolutionary French Republic as a member of the first Coalition. The subsequent War of the Pyrenees polarised the country in a reaction against the gallicised elites and following defeat in the field, peace was made with France in 1795 at the Peace of Basel in which Spain lost control over two-thirds of the island of Hispaniola. In 1807, a secret treaty between Napoleon and the unpopular prime minister led to a new declaration of war against Britain and Portugal. French troops entered the country to invade Portugal but instead occupied Spain's major fortresses. The Spanish king abdicated and a puppet kingdom satellite to the French Empire was installed with Joseph Bonaparte as king.

The 2 May 1808 revolt was one of many uprisings across the country against the French occupation. These revolts marked the beginning of a devastating war of independence against the Napoleonic regime, which resulted in an estimated 300,000 to 500,000 Spanish dead. Further military action by Spanish armies, guerrilla warfare and an Anglo-Portuguese allied army, combined with Napoleon's failure on the Russian front, led to the retreat of French imperial armies from the Iberian Peninsula in 1814, and the return of King Ferdinand VII.

During the war, in 1810, a revolutionary body, the Cortes of Cádiz, was assembled to coordinate the effort against the Bonapartist regime and to prepare a constitution. It met as one body, and its members represented the entire Spanish empire. In 1812, a constitution for universal representation under a constitutional monarchy was declared, but after the fall of the Bonapartist regime, the Spanish king dismissed the Cortes Generales, set on ruling as an absolute monarch.

The French occupation of mainland Spain created an opportunity for overseas criollo elites who resented the privilege towards Peninsular elites and demanded retroversion of the sovereignty to the people. Starting in 1809 the American colonies began a series of revolutions and declared independence, leading to the Spanish American wars of independence that put an end to the metropole's grip over the Spanish Main. Attempts to re-assert control proved futile with opposition not only in the colonies but also in the Iberian peninsula and army revolts followed. By the end of 1826, the only American colonies Spain held were Cuba and Puerto Rico.

The Napoleonic War left Spain economically ruined, deeply divided and politically unstable. In the 1830s and 1840s, Carlism, a reactionary legitimist movement supportive of an alternative Bourbon branch, fought against the government forces supportive of Queen Isabella II's dynastic rights in the Carlist Wars. Government forces prevailed, but the conflict between progressives and moderates ended in a weak early constitutional period. The 1868 Glorious Revolution was followed by the 1868–1874 progressive Sexenio Democrático (including the short-lived First Spanish Republic), which yielded to a stable monarchic period, the Restoration (1875–1931).

In the late 19th century, nationalist movements arose in the Philippines and Cuba. In 1895 and 1896, the Cuban War of Independence and the Philippine Revolution broke out, both were conflicts that eventually involved the United States. The Spanish–American War was fought from April to August 1898 and resulted in Spain losing the last of its once vast colonial empire outside of North Africa. El Desastre (the Disaster), as the war became known in Spain, gave added impetus to the Generation of '98.

Although the period around the turn of the century was one of increasing prosperity, the 20th century brought little social peace. Spain played a minor part in the scramble for Africa. It remained neutral during World War I. The heavy losses suffered by the colonial troops in conflicts in northern Morocco against Riffian tribes brought discredit to the government and undermined the monarchy.

Industrialisation, the development of railways, and incipient capitalism took place in several areas of the country, particularly in Barcelona, alongside the growth of the labour movement and the spread of socialist and anarchist ideas. The 1870 Barcelona Workers' Congress and the 1888 Barcelona Universal Exposition are good examples of this. In 1879, the Spanish Socialist Workers' Party was founded. A trade union linked to this party, Unión General de Trabajadores, was founded in 1888. In the anarcho-syndicalist trend of the labour movement in Spain, Confederación Nacional del Trabajo was founded in 1910 and Federación Anarquista Ibérica in 1927.

Catalanism and Vasquism, alongside other nationalisms and regionalisms, arose during this period; the Basque Nationalist Party formed in 1895 and Regionalist League of Catalonia in 1901. Political corruption and repression weakened the democratic system of the constitutional monarchy of a two-parties system. The July 1909 Tragic Week events and repression exemplified the social instability of the time. The La Canadiense strike in 1919 led to the first law limiting the working day to eight hours.

After a period of Crown-supported dictatorship from 1923 to 1931, the first elections since 1923, largely understood as a plebiscite on monarchy, took place: the 12 April 1931 municipal elections. These gave victory to the Republican-Socialist candidacies in large cities and provincial capitals, with a majority of monarchist councilors in rural areas. The king left Spain and the proclamation of the Republic on 14 April ensued, with the formation of a provisional government. In October 1931, Spain's 1931 Constitution was passe following the June 1931 Constituent general election. A series of cabinets presided by Manuel Azaña supported by republican parties and the PSOE followed.

In the 1933 election, the right won, and in 1936, the left. During the Second Republic there was a great political and social upheaval, marked by a sharp radicalisation of the left and the right. Instances of political violence during this period included the burning of churches, the 1932 failed coup d'état led by José Sanjurjo, the Revolution of 1934 and numerous attacks against rival political leaders. It is also during the Second Republic when important reforms to modernise Spain were initiated: a democratic constitution, agrarian reform, restructuring of the army, political decentralisation and women's right to vote.

=== Civil War and Francoist dictatorship ===
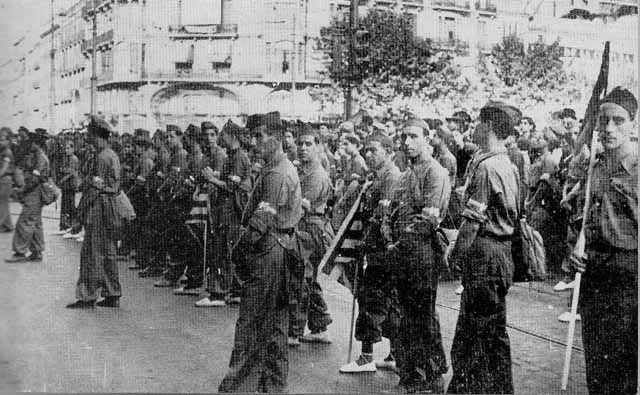
Republican volunteers at Teruel, 1936

Spanish leader Francisco Franco and Adolf Hitler at the Meeting at Hendaye, 1940

The Spanish Civil War broke out in 1936. On 17 and 18 July, part of the military carried out a coup d'état took control of parts of Spain. Spain was divided into two zones: one under the authority of the Republican government, that counted on outside support from the Soviet Union and Mexico (and from International Brigades), and the other controlled by the putschists (the Nationalist or rebel faction), most critically supported by Nazi Germany and Fascist Italy. The Republic was not supported by the Western powers due to the British-led policy of non-intervention. General Francisco Franco was sworn in as the supreme leader of the rebels in October 1936. An uneasy relationship between the Republican government and the grassroots anarchists who had initiated a partial social revolution also ensued.

The civil war was viciously fought and there were many atrocities committed by all sides. The war claimed the lives of over 500,000 people and caused the flight of up to a half-million citizens from Spain. On 1 April 1939, five months before the beginning of World War II, the rebel side led by Franco emerged victorious, imposing a dictatorship over the whole country. Thousands were imprisoned after the civil war in Francoist concentration camps. Between 1939 and 1943, approximately 200,000 people in Spain died from famine.

The regime remained nominally "neutral" for much of the Second World War, although it was sympathetic to the Axis and provided the Nazi Wehrmacht with Spanish volunteers in the Eastern Front. The only legal party under Franco's dictatorship was the Falange Española Tradicionalista y de las JONS (FET y de las JONS), formed in 1937 upon the merging of the Fascist Falange Española de las JONS and the Carlist traditionalists and to which the rest of right-wing groups supporting the rebels also added. The name of "Movimiento Nacional" was largely imposed over official documents in the 1950s.

After the war, Spain was politically and economically isolated, and was kept out of the United Nations. This changed in 1955, during the Cold War period, when it became strategically important for the US to establish a military presence on the Iberian Peninsula to counter possible moves by the Soviet Union. US Cold War strategic priorities included the dissemination of American educational ideas to foster modernisation and expansion. In the 1960s, Spain had an unprecedented rate of economic growth, propelled by industrialisation, a mass internal migration from rural areas to Madrid, Barcelona and the Basque Country and tourism.

=== Restoration of democracy ===
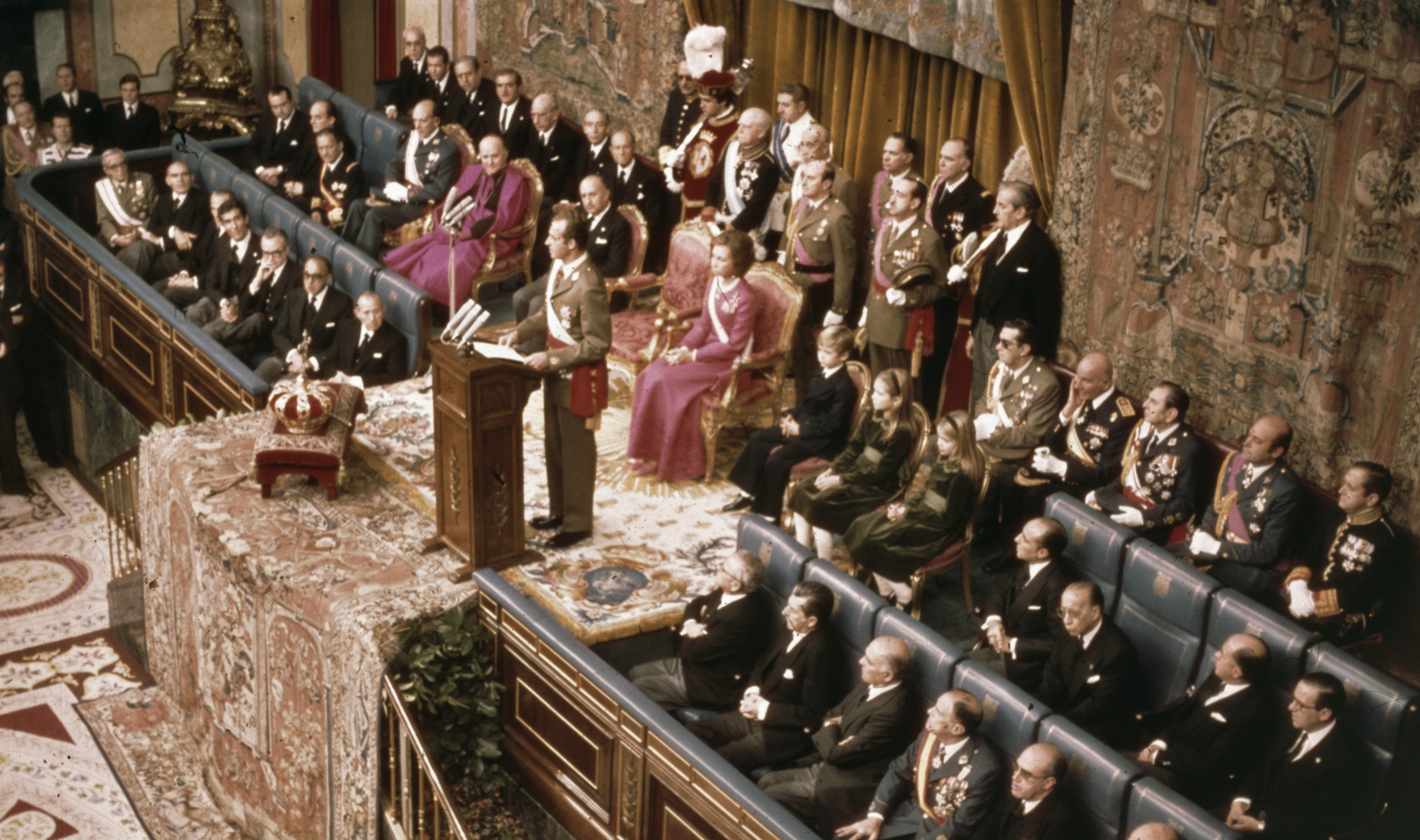
Juan Carlos I before the Cortes Españolas, during his proclamation as King on 22 November 1975

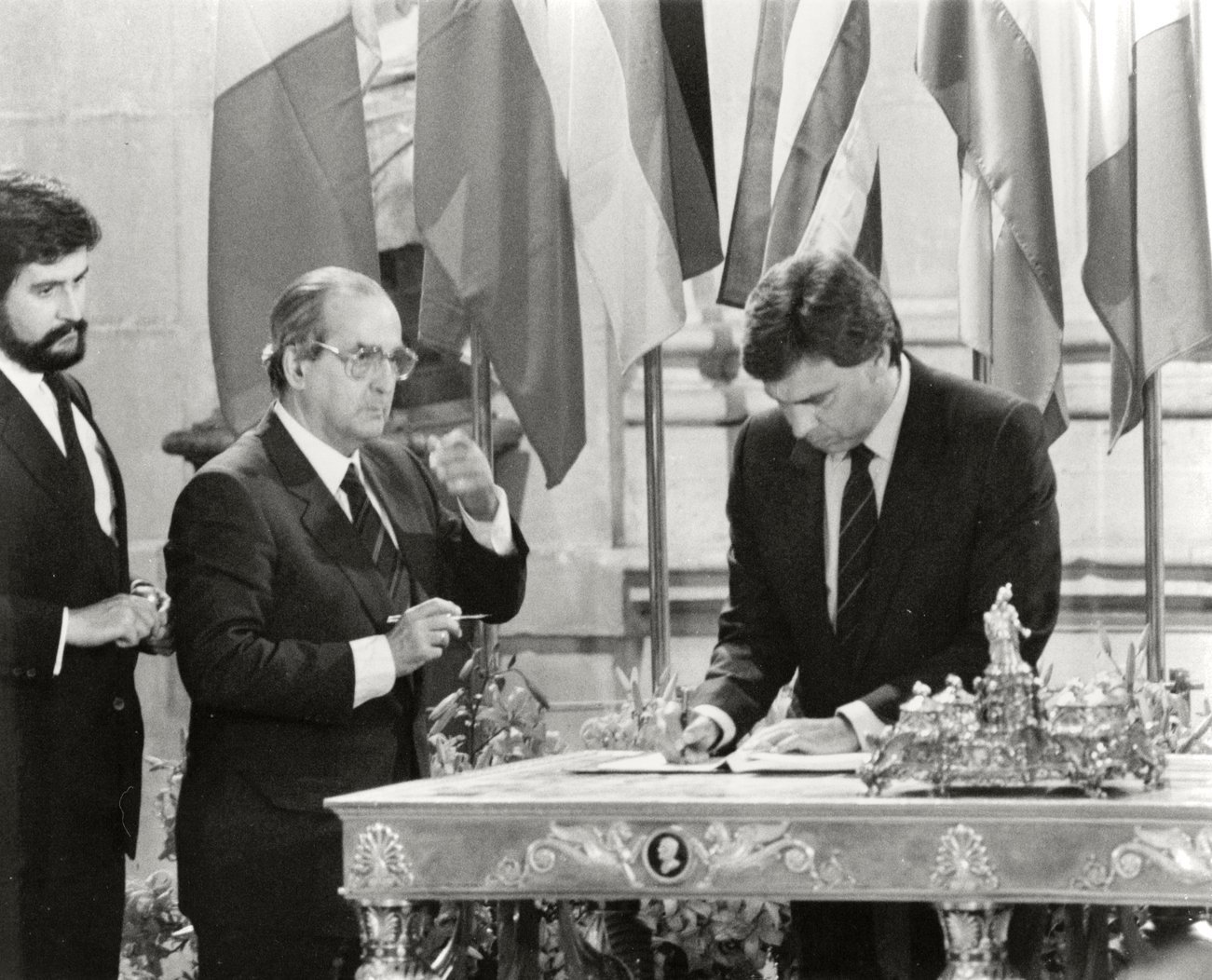
Felipe González signing the treaty of accession to the European Economic Community on 12 June 1985

In 1962, a group of politicians involved in the opposition to Franco's regime inside Spain and in exile met in the congress of the European Movement in Munich, where they made a resolution in favour of democracy. With Franco's death in November 1975, Juan Carlos succeeded to the position of King of Spain and head of state in accordance with the Francoist law. With the approval of the new Spanish Constitution of 1978 and the restoration of democracy, the State devolved much authority to the regions and created an internal organisation based on autonomous communities. The Spanish 1977 Amnesty Law let people of Franco's regime continue inside institutions without consequences, even perpetrators of some crimes during transition to democracy like the Massacre of 3 March 1976 in Vitoria or 1977 Massacre of Atocha.

In the Basque Country, moderate Basque nationalism coexisted with a radical nationalist movement led by the armed organisation ETA until ETA's dissolution in May 2018. ETA was formed in 1959 during Franco's rule, but continued to wage its violent campaign even after the restoration of democracy and the return of a large measure of regional autonomy.

On 23 February 1981, rebel elements among the security forces seized the Cortes in an attempt to impose a military-backed government. King Juan Carlos took personal command of the military and successfully ordered the coup plotters, via national television, to surrender.

In the 1980s the democratic restoration made possible a growing open society. New cultural movements based on freedom appeared, like La Movida Madrileña. In May 1982, Spain joined NATO, followed by a 1986 referendum after a strong social opposition. In 1986, the Spanish Socialist Workers Party (PSOE) came to power, the first left-wing government in 43 years. In 1986, Spain joined the European Economic Community, which later became the European Union. In 1996, the PSOE was replaced in government by the Partido Popular (PP) after scandals around participation of the government of Felipe González in the Dirty war against ETA.

=== Economic prosperity and crash ===
On 1 January 2002, Spain fully adopted the euro, and Spain experienced strong economic growth, well above the EU average during the early 2000s. However, well-publicised concerns issued by many economic commentators at the height of the boom warned that extraordinary property prices and a high foreign trade deficit were likely to lead to a painful economic collapse.

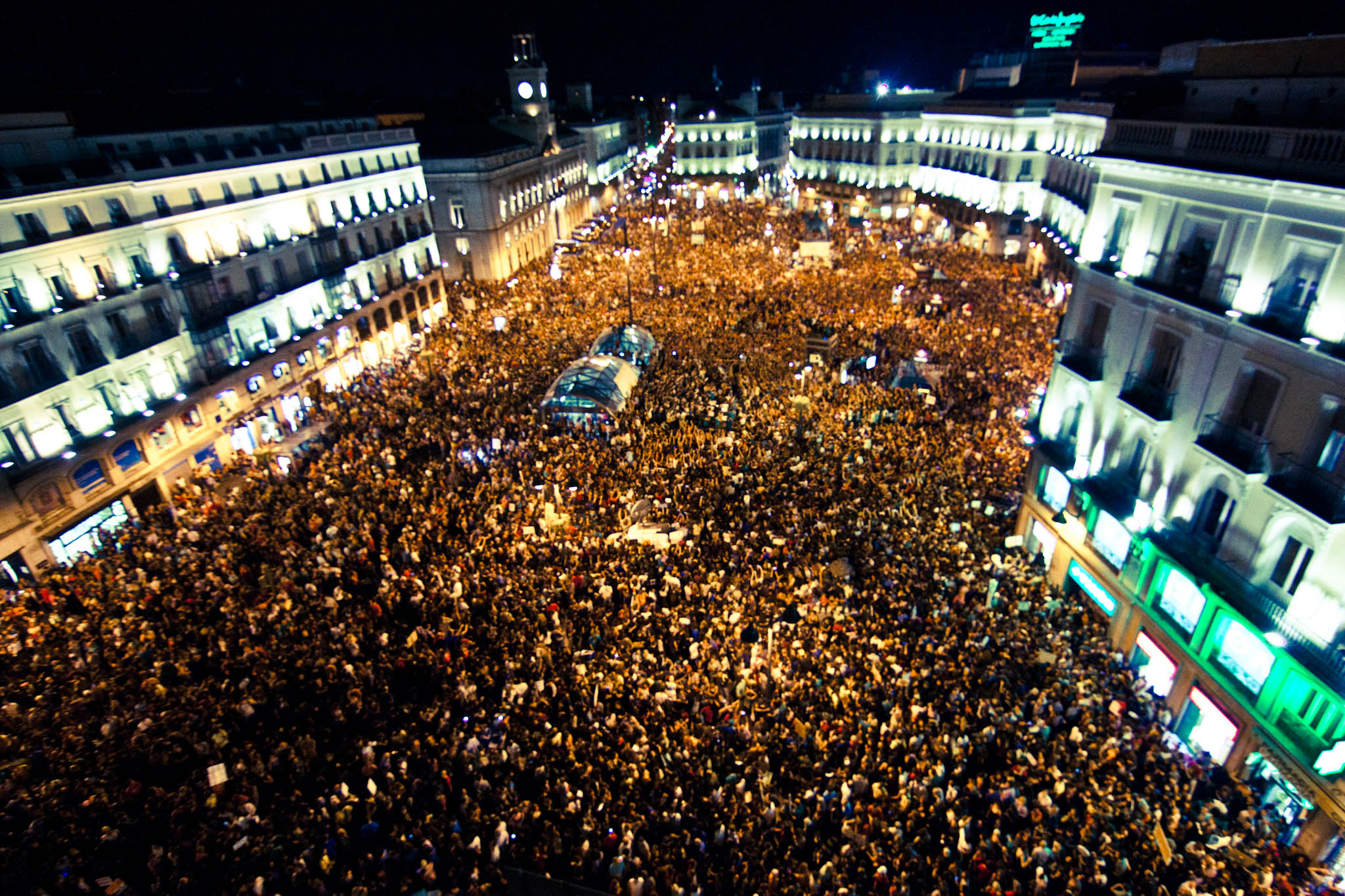
A demonstration against the crisis and high youth unemployment in Madrid, 15 October 2011

In 2002, the Prestige oil spill occurred with big ecological consequences along Spain's Atlantic coastline. In 2003 José María Aznar supported US president George W. Bush in the Iraq War, and a strong movement against war rose in Spanish society. In March 2004 a local Islamist terrorist group inspired by Al-Qaeda carried out the largest terrorist attack in Western European history when they killed 191 people and wounded more than 1,800 others by bombing commuter trains in Madrid. Though initial suspicions focused on the Basque terrorist group ETA, evidence of Islamist involvement soon emerged. Because of the proximity of the 2004 Spanish general election, the issue of responsibility quickly became a political controversy, with the main competing parties, the PP (People's Party) and PSOE (Spanish Socialist Workers' party) exchanging accusations over the handling of the incident. The PSOE won the election, led by José Luis Rodríguez Zapatero.

In the early 2000s, the proportion of Spain's foreign born population increased rapidly during its economic boom but then declined due to the 2008 financial crisis. In 2005, the Spanish government legalised same sex marriage, becoming the third country worldwide to do so. Decentralisation was supported with much resistance of Constitutional Court and conservative opposition, so did gender politics like quotas or the law against gender violence. Government talks with ETA happened, and the group announced its permanent cease of violence in 2010.

The bursting of the Spanish property bubble in 2008 led to the 2008–2014 Spanish financial crisis. High levels of unemployment, cuts in government spending and corruption within the Royal family and the People's Party served as a backdrop to the 2011–12 Spanish protests. The Catalan independence movement also gained traction. In 2011, Mariano Rajoy's conservative People's Party won the election with 44.6% of votes. As prime minister, he implemented austerity measures for the EU bailout, the EU Stability and Growth Pact. On 19 June 2014, the monarch, Juan Carlos, abdicated in favour of his son, who became Felipe VI.

=== Constitutional issues ===
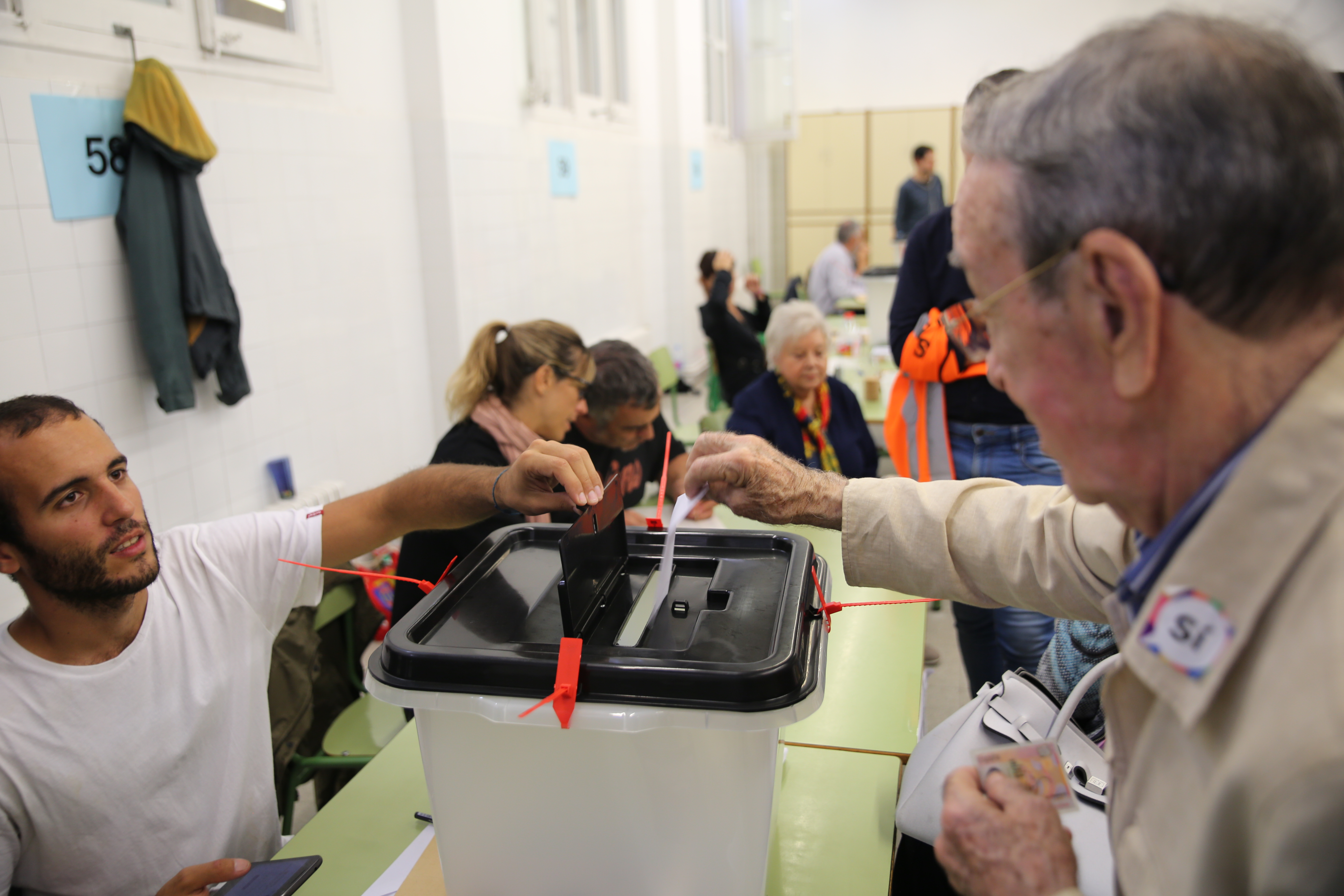
Catalans casting their votes in Barcelona during the 2017 Catalan independence referendum

In October 2017 a Catalan independence referendum was held and the Parliament of Catalonia voted to unilaterally declare independence from Spain to form a Catalan Republic on the day the Spanish Senate was discussing approving direct rule over Catalonia as called for by the Spanish Prime Minister. On the same day the Senate granted the power to impose direct rule and Mariano Rajoy dissolved the Catalan parliament and called a new election. No country recognised Catalonia as a separate state.

In June 2018, the Congress of Deputies passed a motion of no-confidence against Rajoy and replaced him with the PSOE leader Pedro Sánchez. In 2019, the first ever coalition government in Spain was formed, between PSOE and Unidas Podemos (now Sumar). Between 2018 and 2024, Spain faced an institutional crisis surrounding the mandate of the General Council of the Judiciary (CGPJ), until the mandate got renovated. In January 2020, the COVID-19 virus was confirmed to have spread to Spain, causing life expectancy to drop by more than a year. The European Commission economic recovery package Next Generation EU was created to support the EU member states to recover from the COVID-19 pandemic, and will be in use in the period 2021–2026. In March 2021, Spain became the sixth nation in the world to make active euthanasia legal.

Following the general election on 23 July 2023, Prime Minister Pedro Sánchez again formed a coalition government, this time with Sumar, the successor of Unidas Podemos. In 2024, the first non-independentist Catalan regional president in over a decade, Salvador Illa, was elected, normalising the constitutional and institutional relations between the national and the regional administrations. In 2024, only 17.3% of Catalans feel themselves as "only Catalan". 46% of Catalans would answer "as Spanish as Catalan", while 21.8% "more Catalan than Spanish". In 2024 polling, over 50% of Catalans would vote against independence, while less than 40% would vote in favour.

== Geography ==
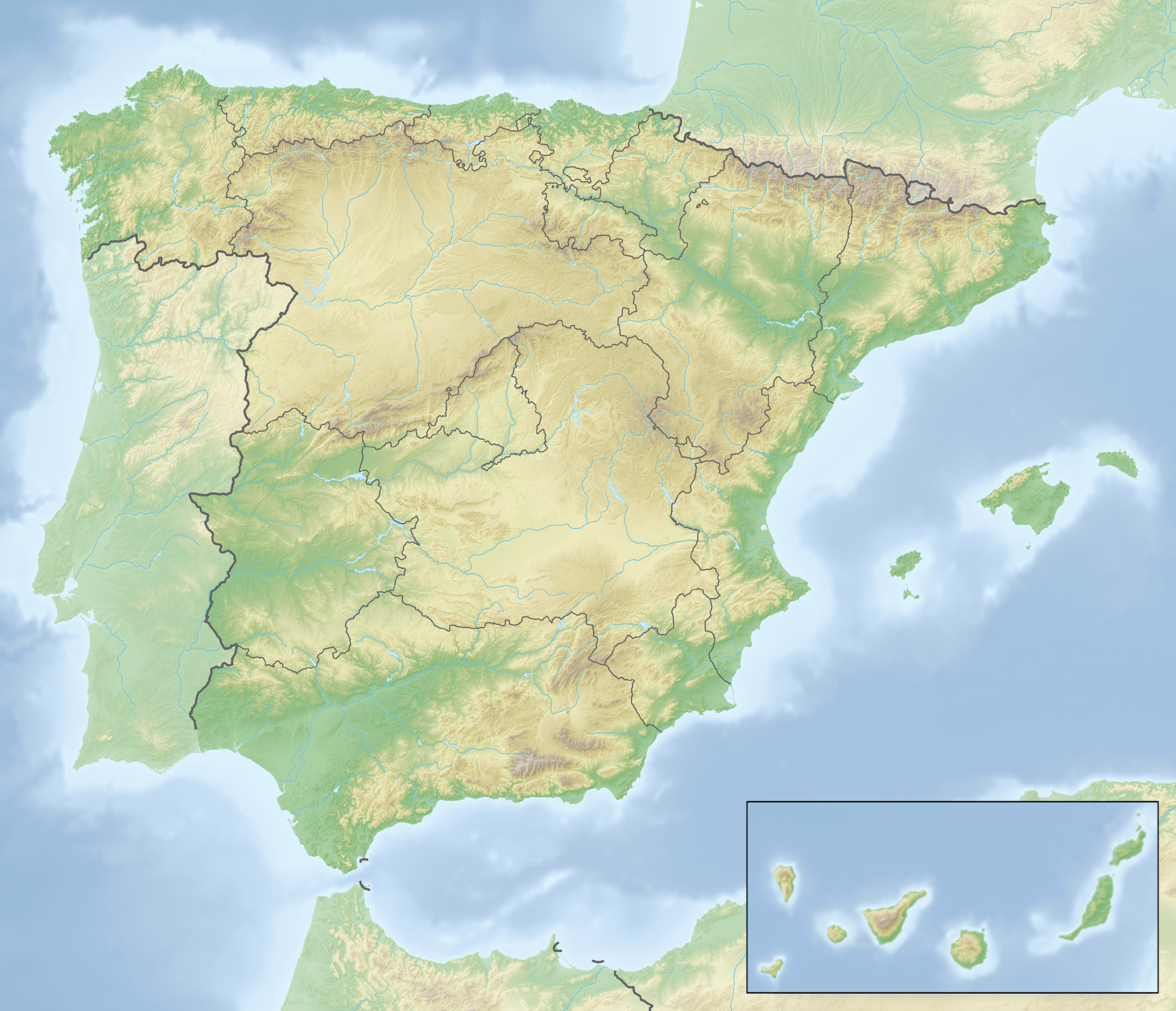
A topographic map of Spain

At 505,992 km^{2} (195,365 sq mi), Spain is the world's fiftieth largest country and Europe's fourth largest country. At 3,715 m (12,188 ft), Mount Teide (Tenerife) is the highest mountain peak in Spain and is the third largest volcano in the world from its base. Spain is a transcontinental country, having territory in both Europe and Africa.

Spain lies between latitudes 27° and 44° N, and longitudes 19° W and 5° E.

On the west, Spain is bordered by Portugal; on the south, it is bordered by Gibraltar and Morocco, through its exclaves in North Africa (Ceuta and Melilla, and the peninsula of de Vélez de la Gomera). On the northeast, along the Pyrenees mountain range, it is bordered by France and Andorra. Along the Pyrenees in Girona, a small exclave town called Llívia is surrounded by France.

Extending to 1,214 km (754 mi), the Portugal–Spain border is the longest uninterrupted border within the European Union.

=== Islands ===
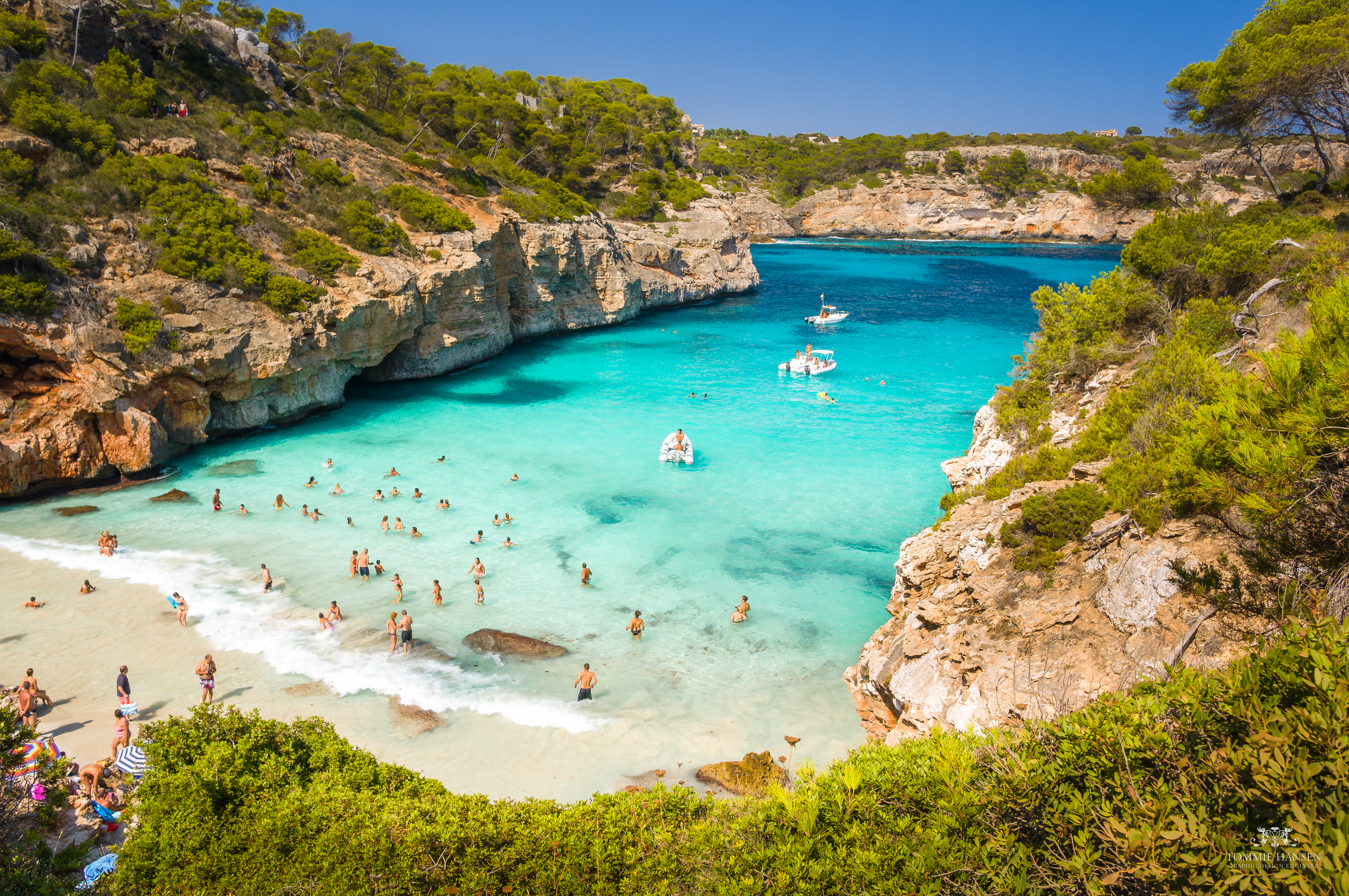
Caló d'es Moro, Mallorca island

Spain also includes the Balearic Islands in the Mediterranean Sea, the Canary Islands in the Atlantic Ocean and a number of uninhabited islands on the Mediterranean side of the Strait of Gibraltar, known as plazas de soberanía ("places of sovereignty", or territories under Spanish sovereignty), such as the Chafarinas Islands and Alhucemas. The peninsula of de Vélez de la Gomera is also regarded as a plaza de soberanía. The isle of Alborán, located in the Mediterranean between Spain and North Africa, is also administered by Spain, specifically by the municipality of Almería, Andalusia. The little Pheasant Island in the River Bidasoa is a Spanish-French condominium.

There are eleven major islands in Spain, all of which have their own governing bodies (Cabildos insulares in the Canaries, Consells insulars in Baleares). These islands are specifically mentioned by the Spanish Constitution, when fixing its Senatorial representation (Ibiza and Formentera are grouped, as they together form the Pityusic islands, part of the Balearic archipelago). These islands include Tenerife, Gran Canaria, Lanzarote, Fuerteventura, La Palma, La Gomera and El Hierro in the Canarian archipelago and Mallorca, Ibiza, Menorca and Formentera in the Balearic archipelago.

=== Mountains and rivers ===
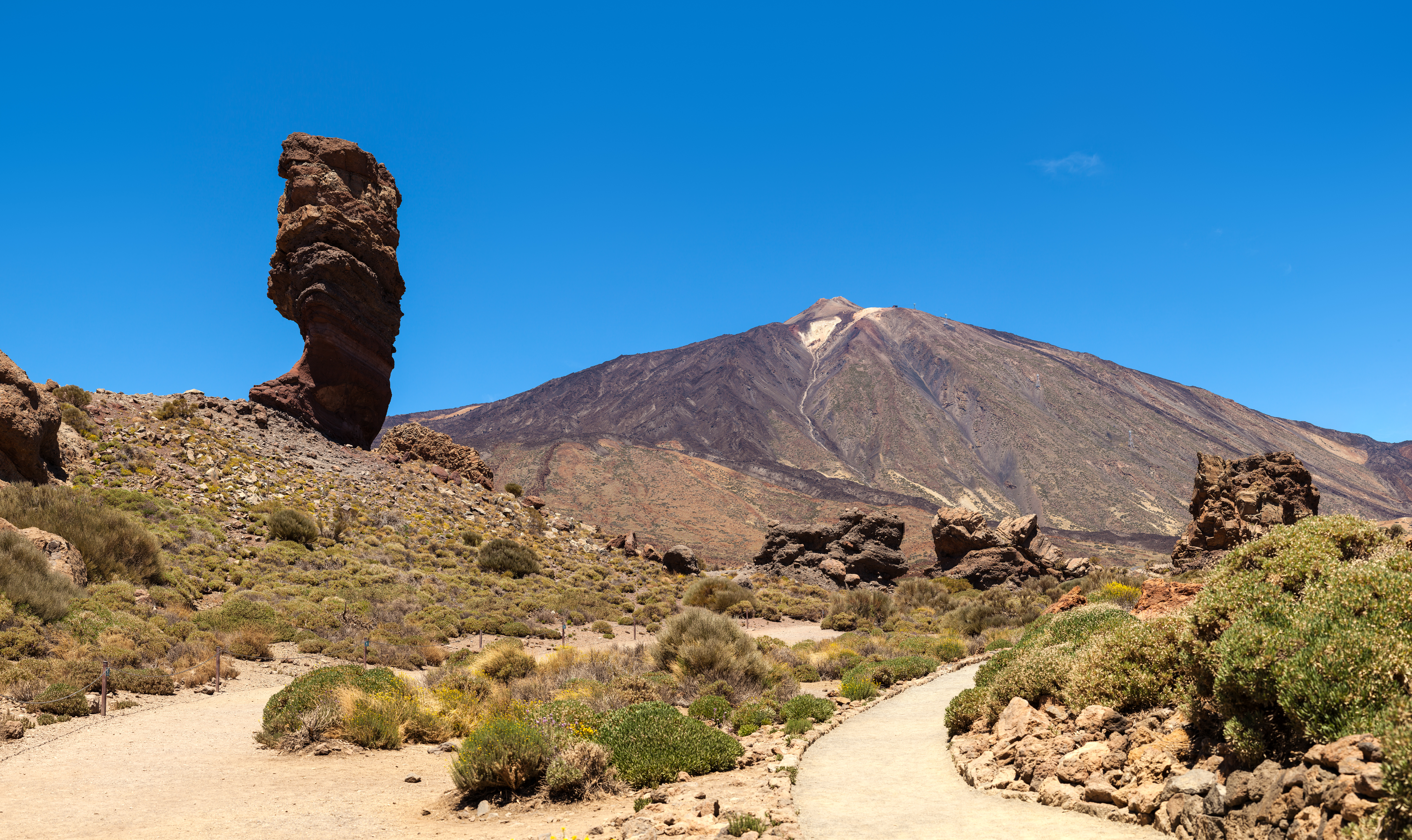
Teide, an active volcano in Tenerife, Canary Islands, is the tallest peak in Spain.

Mainland Spain is a rather mountainous landmass, dominated by high plateaus and mountain chains. After the Pyrenees, the main mountain ranges are the Cordillera Cantábrica (Cantabrian Range), Sistema Ibérico (Iberian System), Sistema Central (Central System), Montes de Toledo, Sierra Morena and the Sistema Bético (Baetic System) whose highest peak, the 3,478-metre-high (11,411-foot) Mulhacén, located in Sierra Nevada, is the highest elevation in the Iberian Peninsula. The highest point in Spain is the Teide, a 3,718-metre (12,198 ft) active volcano in the Canary Islands. The Meseta Central (often translated as 'Inner Plateau') is a vast plateau in the heart of peninsular Spain split in two by the Sistema Central.

There are several major rivers in Spain such as the Tagus (Tajo), Ebro, Guadiana, Douro (Duero), Guadalquivir, Júcar, Segura, Turia and Minho (Miño). Alluvial plains are found along the coast, the largest of which is that of the Guadalquivir in Andalusia.

=== Climate ===
Köppen climate types of Spain

Three main climatic zones can be separated, according to geographical situation and orographic conditions:

- The Mediterranean climate is characterised by warm or hot and dry summers and is the predominant climate in the country. It has two varieties: Csa and Csb, according to the Köppen climate classification.
  - The Csa zone is associated with areas with hot summers. It is predominant in the Southern Mediterranean (except southeastern) and Southern Atlantic coast and inland throughout Andalusia, Extremadura and much of the centre of the country. Some areas of Csa, mainly those inland, such as some areas of Castilla-La-Mancha, Extremadura, Madrid and some parts of Andalusia, have cool winters with some continental influences, while the regions with a Mediterranean climate close to the sea have mild winters.
  - The Csb zone has warm rather than hot summers, and extends to additional cool-winter areas not typically associated with a Mediterranean climate, such as much of central and northern-central of Spain (e.g. western Castile–León, northeastern Castilla-La Mancha and northern Madrid) and into much rainier areas (notably Galicia).
- The semi-arid climate (BSk, BSh) is predominant in the southeastern quarter of the country, but is also widespread in other areas of Spain. It covers most of the Region of Murcia, southern and central-eastern Valencia, eastern Andalusia, various areas of Castilla-La-Mancha, Madrid and some areas of Extremadura. Further to the north, it is predominant in the upper and mid reaches of the Ebro valley, which crosses southern Navarre, central Aragon and western Catalonia. It is also found in a small area in northern Andalusia and in a small area in central Castilla-León. Precipitation is limited with the dry season extending beyond the summer and average temperature depending on altitude and latitude.
- The oceanic climate (Cfb) is located in the northern quarter of the country, especially in the Atlantic region (Basque Country, Cantabria, Asturias, and partly Galicia and Castile–León). It is also found in northern Navarre, in most highlands areas along the Iberian System and in the Pyrenean valleys, where a humid subtropical variant (Cfa) also occurs. Winter and summer temperatures are influenced by the ocean, and have no seasonal drought.

Apart from these main types, other sub-types can be found, like the alpine climate in areas with very high altitude, the humid subtropical climate in areas of northeastern Spain and the continental climates (Dfc, Dfb / Dsc, Dsb) in the Pyrenees as well as parts of the Cantabrian Range, the Central System, Sierra Nevada and the Iberian System, and a typical desert climate (BWk, BWh) in the zone of Almería, Murcia and eastern Canary Islands. Low-lying areas of the Canary Islands average above 18.0 °C (64.4 °F) during their coolest month, thus having influences of tropical climate, although they cannot properly be classified as tropical climates, as according to AEMET, their aridity is high, thus belonging to an arid or semi-arid climate.

Spain is one of the countries that is most affected by climate change in Europe. In Spain, which already has a hot and dry climate, extreme events such as heatwaves are becoming increasingly frequent. The country is also experiencing more episodes of drought and increased severity of these episodes. Water resources will be severely affected in various climate change scenarios. To mitigate the effects of climate change, Spain is promoting an energy transition to renewable energies, such as solar and wind energy.

=== Fauna and flora ===
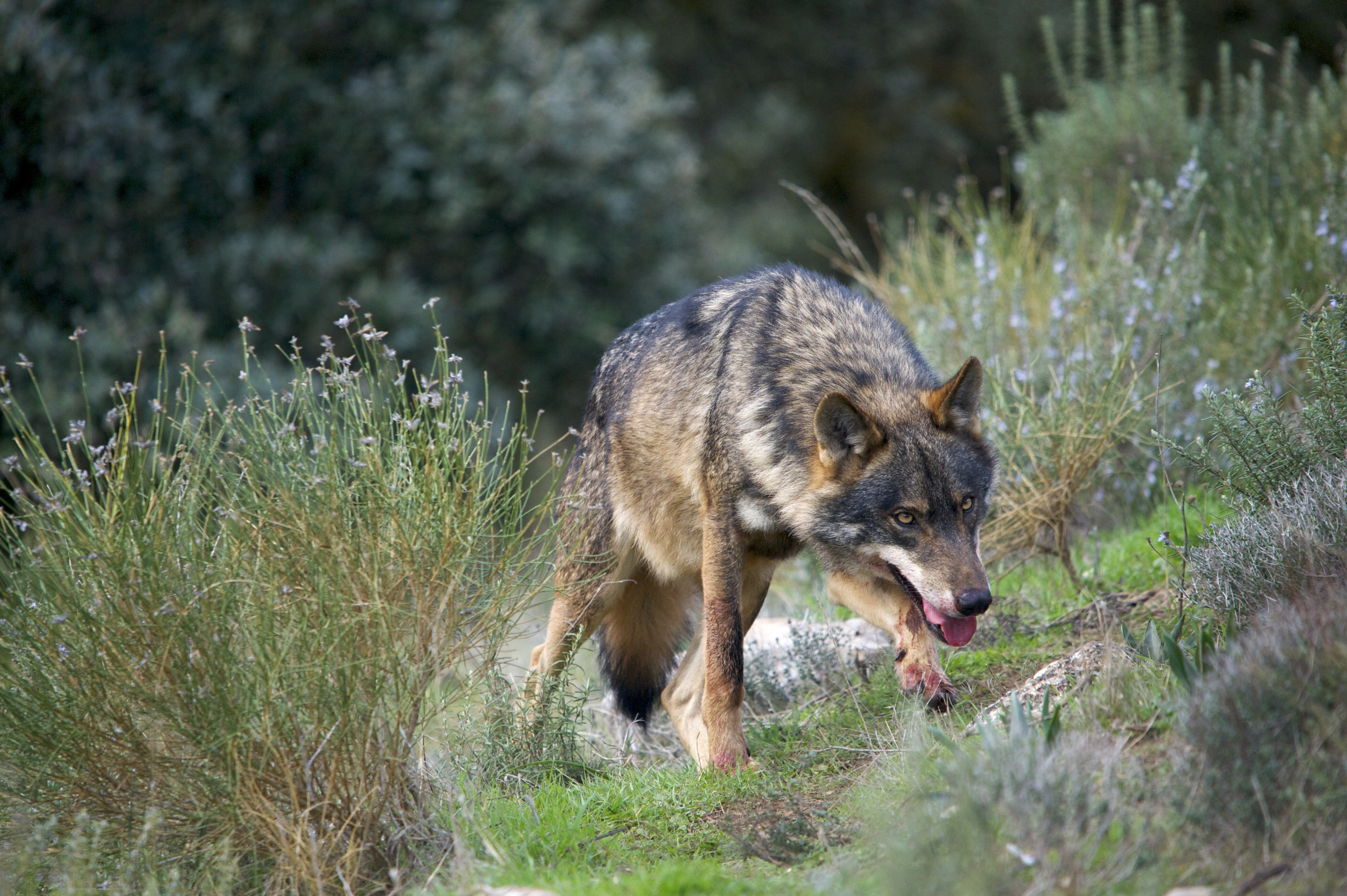
The Iberian wolf in Castile and León. The region has 25% of the land covered by Natura 2000 protected natural spaces.

The fauna presents a wide diversity that is due in large part to the geographical position of the Iberian peninsula between the Atlantic and the Mediterranean and between Africa and Eurasia, and the great diversity of habitats and biotopes, the result of a considerable variety of climates and well differentiated regions.

The vegetation of Spain is varied due to several factors including the diversity of the terrain, the climate and latitude. Spain includes different phytogeographic regions, each with its own floral characteristics resulting largely from the interaction of climate, topography, soil type and fire, and biotic factors. The country had a 2019 Forest Landscape Integrity Index mean score of 4.23/10, ranking it 130th globally out of 172 countries.

Within the European territory, Spain has the largest number of plant species (7,600 vascular plants) of all European countries.

In Spain there are over 17 billion trees, and an average of 284 million new trees grow each year.

== Politics ==
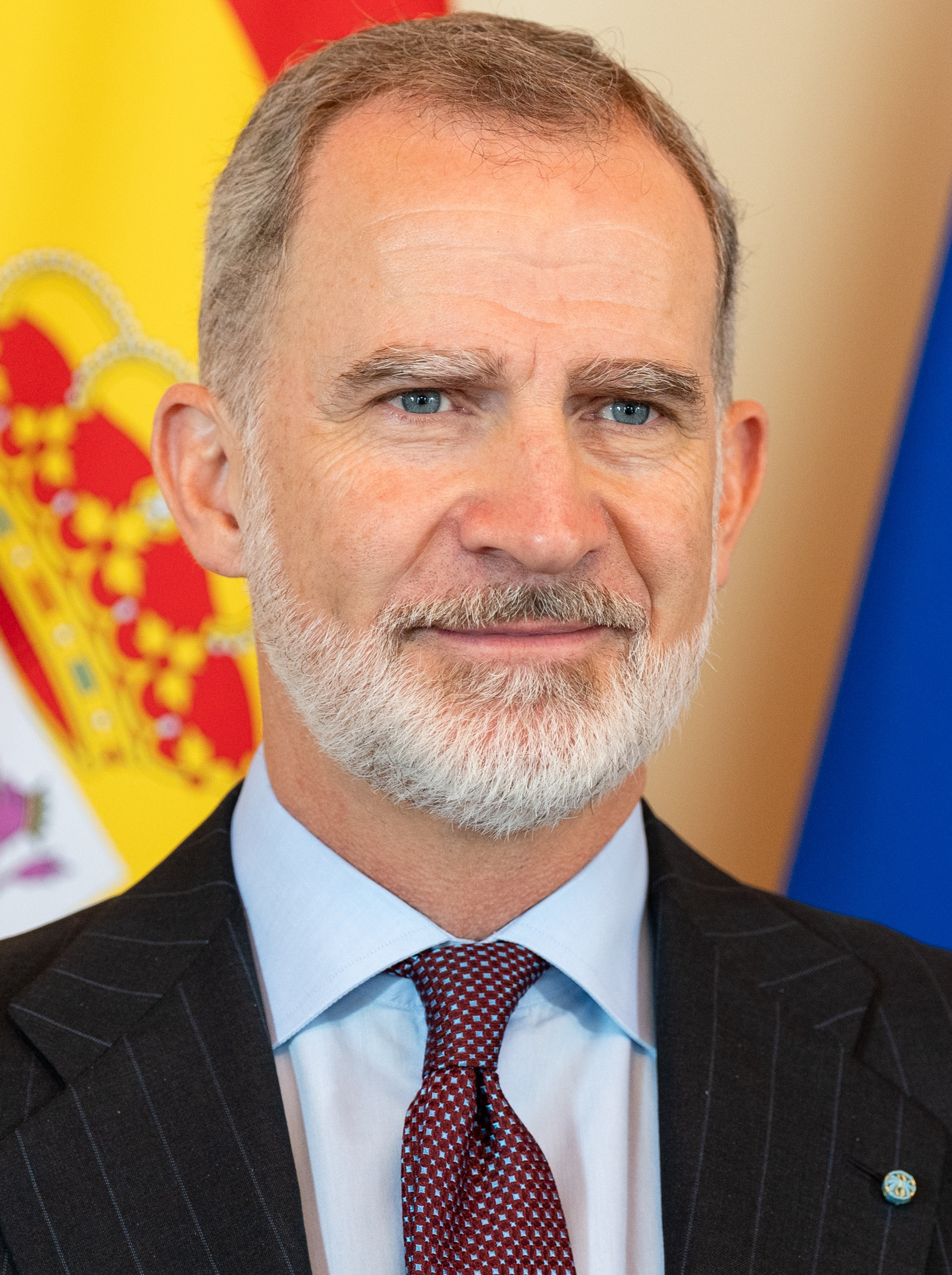
Felipe VI
King

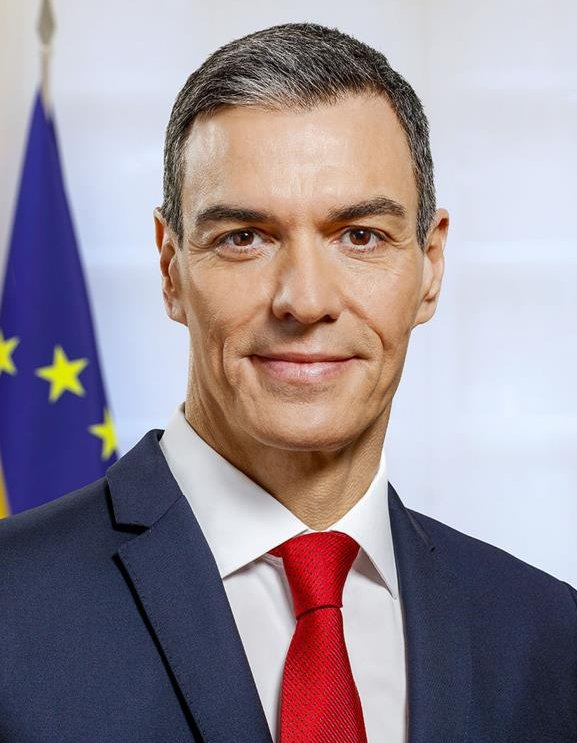
Pedro Sánchez
Prime Minister

The constitutional history of Spain dates back to the constitution of 1812. In June 1976, Spain's new King Juan Carlos dismissed Carlos Arias Navarro and appointed the reformer Adolfo Suárez as Prime Minister. The resulting general election in 1977 convened the Constituent Cortes (the Spanish Parliament, in its capacity as a constitutional assembly) for the purpose of drafting and approving the constitution of 1978. After a national referendum on 6 December 1978, 88% of voters approved of the new constitution. As a result, Spain successfully transitioned from a one-party personalist dictatorship to a multiparty parliamentary democracy composed of seventeen autonomous communities and two autonomous cities. These regions enjoy varying degrees of autonomy thanks to the Spanish Constitution, which nevertheless explicitly states the indivisible unity of the Spanish nation.

According to International IDEA's Global State of Democracy (GSoD) Indices and Democracy Tracker, Spain performs in the high range on overall democratic measures, with particular strengths in inclusive suffrage and access to justice.

=== Governance ===
==== The Crown ====
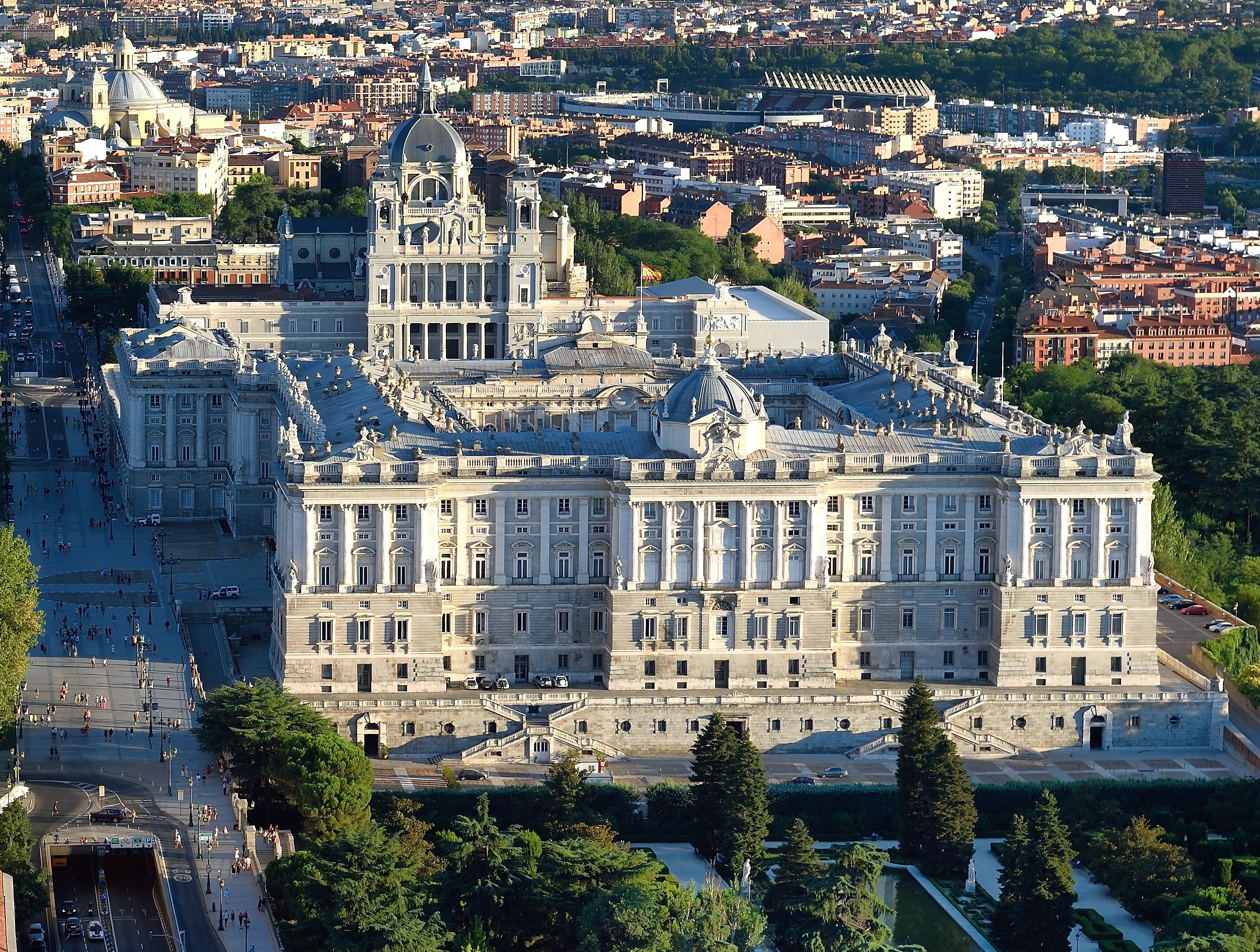
Royal Palace of Madrid

The Spanish Constitution provides for a separation of powers between five branches of government, which it refers to as "basic State institutions". (Note: Those nationwide institutions are the Crown, the Cortes Generales, the Government, the Judiciary, and the Constitutional Tribunal.) Foremost amongst these institutions is the Crown (La Corona), the symbol of the Spanish state and its permanence. Spain's "parliamentary monarchy" is a constitutional one whereby the reigning king or queen is the living embodiment of the Crown and thus head of state. (Note: Most Spanish monarchs have been kings. However, a queen regnant – while uncommon – is possible due to Spain's adherence to male-preference primogeniture. Leonor, Princess of Asturias, would be Spain's first queen regnant since Isabella II, who reigned from 1833 to 1868, should she someday succeed her father Felipe VI as expected.)

Unlike in some other constitutional monarchies, namely the likes of Belgium, Denmark, Luxembourg, The Netherlands, Norway, or the United Kingdom, the monarch is not the fount of national sovereignty or even the nominal chief executive. Rather, the Crown, as an institution, "...arbitrates and moderates the regular functioning of the institutions..." of the Spanish state. As such, the monarch resolves disputes between the disparate branches, mediates constitutional crises, and prevents abuses of power.

In these respects, the Crown constitutes a fifth moderating branch that does not make public policy or administer public services, functions which rightfully rest with Spain's duly elected legislatures and governments at both the national and regional level. Instead, the Crown personifies the democratic Spanish state, sanctions legitimate authority, ensures the legality of means, and guarantees the execution of the public will.

The independence of the Crown, its political neutrality and its wish to embrace and reconcile the different ideological standpoints enable it to contribute to the stability of our political system, facilitating a balance with the other constitutional and territorial bodies, promoting the orderly functioning of the State and providing a channel for cohesion among Spaniards.

— King Felipe VI, 2014

Put another way, the monarch fosters national unity at home, represents Spaniards abroad (especially with regard to nations of their historical community), facilitates the orderly operation and continuity of the Spanish government, defends representative democracy, and upholds the rule of law. In other words, the Crown is the guardian of the Spanish constitution and of the rights and freedoms of all Spaniards. (Note: Former king Juan Carlos I's intervention and foiling of the 1981 Spanish coup attempt is but one example of the Crown exercising its influence as the moderating branch to defend democracy and uphold the rule of law.) This stabilising role is in keeping with the monarch's solemn oath upon accession "...to faithfully carry out [my] duties, to obey the Constitution and the laws and ensure that they are obeyed, and to respect the rights of citizens and the Self-governing Communities."

A number of constitutional powers, duties, rights, responsibilities, and functions are assigned to the monarch in their capacity as head of state. However, the Crown enjoys inviolability in the performance of these prerogatives and cannot be prosecuted in the very courts which administer justice in its name. For this reason, every official act done by the monarch requires the countersignature of the prime minister or, when appropriate, the president of the Congress of Deputies to have the force of law. The countersigning procedure or refrendo in turn transfers political and legal liability for the royal prerogative to the attesting parties. This provision does not apply to the Royal Household, over which the monarch enjoys absolute control and supervision, or to membership in the Order of the Golden Fleece, which is a dynastic order in the personal gift of the House of Bourbon-Anjou.

The royal prerogatives may be classified by whether they are ministerial functions or reserve powers. Ministerial functions are those royal prerogatives that are, pursuant to the convention established by Juan Carlos I, performed by the monarch after soliciting the advice of the Government, the Congress of Deputies, the Senate, the General Council of the Judiciary, or the Constitutional Tribunal, as the case may be. On the other hand, the reserve powers of the Crown are those royal prerogatives which are exercised in the monarch's personal discretion. Most of the Crown's royal prerogatives are ministerial in practice, meaning the monarch has no discretion in their execution and primarily performs them as a matter of state ceremonial. Nevertheless, when performing said ministerial functions, the monarch has the right to be consulted before acting on advice, the right to encourage a particular course of policy or action, and the right to warn the responsible constitutional authorities against the same. Those ministerial functions are as follows:

1. Sanction and promulgate bills duly passed by the Cortes Generales, making them laws. The Spanish Constitution mandates the monarch grant royal assent to each bill within fifteen days of its passage. The monarch does not have a right to veto legislation.
2. Summon the Cortes Generales into session following a general election, dissolve the same upon the expiration of its four-year term, and proclaim the election of the next Cortes. These functions are performed in accordance with the strictures of the Spanish Constitution.
3. Appoint and dismiss ministers of state on the advice of the prime minister.
4. Appoint the president of the Supreme Court on the advice of the General Council of the Judiciary.
5. Appoint the president of the Constitutional Tribunal from among its members, on the advice of the full bench, for a term of three years.
6. Appoint the Fiscal General, who leads the Prosecution Ministry, on the advice of the Government. Before tendering advice, the Government is required to consult the General Council of the Judiciary.
7. Appoint the presidents of the autonomous communities as elected by their respective parliaments.
8. Issue decrees approved in the Council of Ministers, confer civil service and military appointments, and award honours and distinctions in the gift of the state. These functions are performed on the advice of the prime minister or another minister designated thereby. (Note: The Spanish state honours system comprises the Order of Charles III, the Order of Isabella the Catholic, the Order of Civil Merit, the Civil Order of Alfonso X, the Wise, the Order of Saint Raymond of Peñafort, and the Order of Constitutional Merit, among other orders, decorations and medals. The prime minister is ex officio chancellor of the Order of Charles III. On the other hand, the ministers of foreign affairs, education, and justice are the corresponding chancellors for the orders of Isabella the Catholic and of Civil Merit, the Civil Order of Alfonso X, the Wise, and the orders of Saint Raymond of Peñafort and of Constitutional Merit, respectively.)
9. Exercise supreme command and control over the Armed Forces, on the advice of the prime minister.
10. Declare war and make peace on the advice of the prime minister and with the prior authorization of the Cortes Generales.
11. Ratify treaties, on the advice of the prime minister.
12. Accredit Spanish ambassadors and ministers to foreign states and receive the credentials of foreign diplomats to Spain, on the advice of the prime minister.
13. Exercise the right of clemency, but without the authority to grant general pardons, on the advice of the prime minister.
14. Patronise the Royal Academies. (Note: These being the Real Academia de Bellas Artes de San Fernando, the Real Academia de Ciencias Morales y Políticas, the Royal Academy of Engineering of Spain, the Real Academia de la Historia, the Royal Academy of Jurisprudence and Legislation, the Royal Academy of Pharmacy, the Royal Spanish Academy, and the Spanish Royal Academy of Sciences)

The aforesaid limitations do not apply to the exercise of the Crown's reserve powers, which may be invoked by the monarch when necessary to maintain the continuity and stability of state institutions. For example, the monarch has the right to be kept informed on affairs of state through regular audiences with the Government. For this purpose, the monarch may preside at any time over meetings of the Council of Ministers, but only when requested by the prime minister. The monarch may prematurely dissolve the Congress of Deputies, the Senate, or both houses of the Cortes in their entirety before the expiration of their four-year term and, in consequence thereof, concurrently call for snap elections. The monarch exercises this prerogative on the request of the prime minister, after the matter has been discussed by the Council of Ministers. The monarch may choose to accept or refuse the request. The monarch may also order national referendums on the request of the prime minister, but only with the prior authorisation of the Cortes Generales. Again, the monarch may choose to accept or refuse the prime minister's request.

The Crown's reserve powers further extend into constitutional interpretation and the administration of justice. The monarch appoints the twenty members of the General Council of the Judiciary. Of these counselors, twelve are nominated by the supreme, appellate and trial courts, four are nominated by the Congress of Deputies by a majority of three-fifths of its members, and four are nominated by the Senate with the same majority. The monarch may choose to accept or refuse any nomination. In a similar vein, the monarch appoints the twelve magistrates of the Constitutional Tribunal. Of these magistrates, four magistrates are nominated by the Congress of Deputies by a majority of three-fifths of its members, four magistrates are nominated by the Senate with the same majority, two magistrates are nominated by the Government, and two magistrates are nominated by the General Council of the Judiciary. The monarch may choose to accept or refuse any nomination.

It is the monarch's reserve powers concerning Government formation that are perhaps the most frequently exercised. The monarch nominates a candidate for prime minister and, as the case may be, appoints or removes them from office based on the prime minister's ability to maintain the confidence of the Congress of Deputies. If the Congress of Deputies fails to give its confidence to a new Government within two months, and is incapable of governing as a result of parliamentary gridlock, the monarch may dissolve the Cortes Generales and call for fresh elections. The monarch makes use of these reserve powers in their own deliberative judgment after consulting the president of the Congress of Deputies.

==== Cortes Generales ====
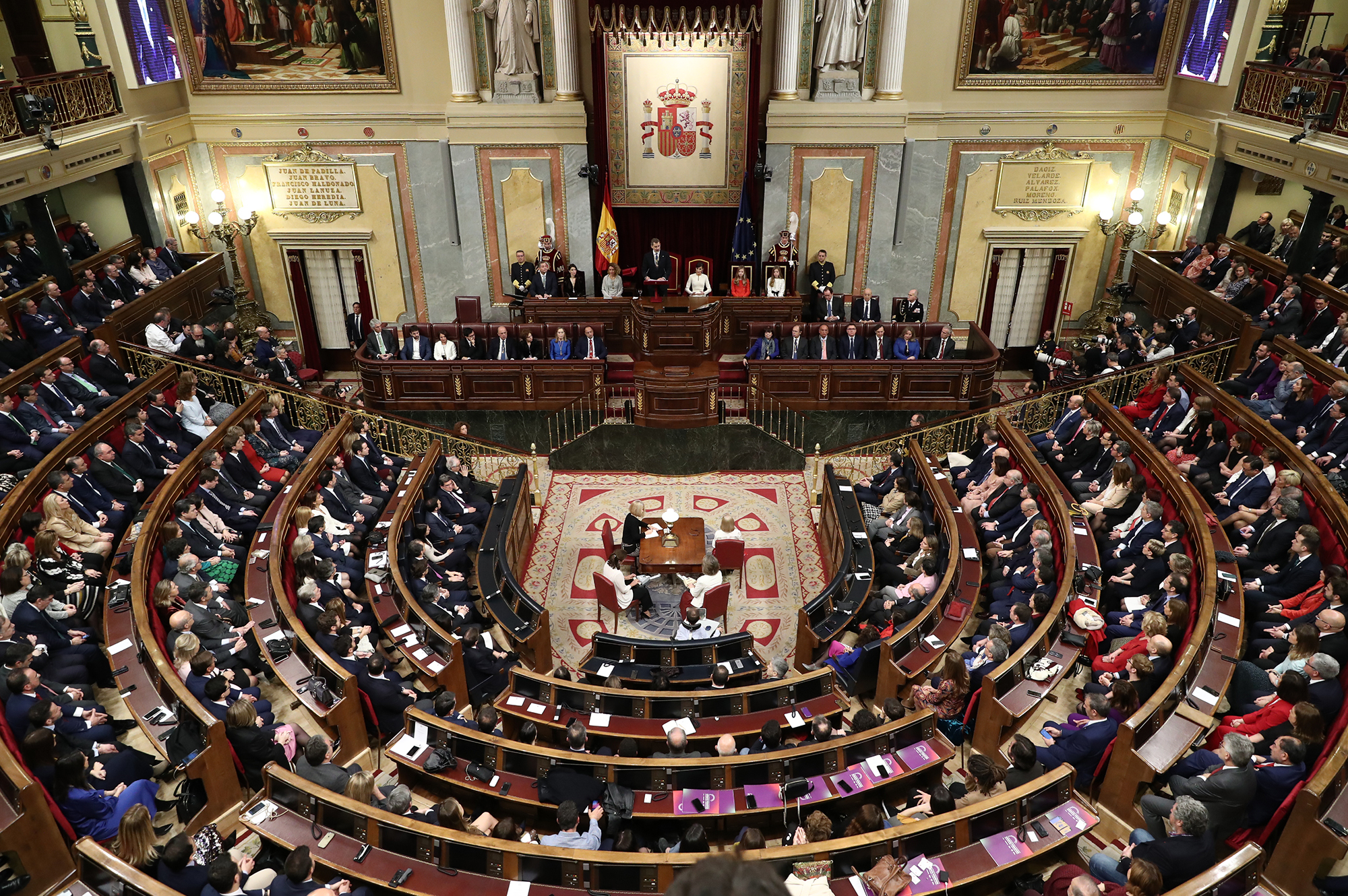
The hemicycle of the Congress of Deputies

Legislative authority vests in the Cortes Generales (English: Spanish Parliament, lit. 'General Courts'), a democratically elected bicameral parliament that serves as the supreme representative body of the Spanish people. Aside from the Crown, it is the only basic State institution that enjoys inviolability. It comprises the Congress of Deputies (Congreso de los Diputados), a lower house with 350 deputies, and the Senate (Senado), an upper house with 266 senators.

Deputies are elected by popular vote on closed lists via proportional representation to serve four-year terms. 208 senators are directly elected by popular vote using a limited voting method, with the remaining 58 senators appointed by the regional legislatures to also serve four-year terms.

==== Government ====
Executive authority rests with the Government (Gobierno de España), which is collectively responsible to the Congress of Deputies. It consists of the prime minister, one or more deputy prime ministers, and the ministers of state. These characters together constitute the Council of Ministers which, as Spain's central executive authority, conducts the business of the Government and administers the civil service. The Government remains in office so long as it can maintain the confidence of the Congress of Deputies.

The prime minister, as head of government, has primacy over the other ministers by virtue of their ability to advise the monarch as to their appointment and dismissal. The prime minister has plenary authority conferred by the Spanish Constitution to direct and coordinate the Government's policies and administrative actions. The Spanish monarch nominates the prime minister after consulting representatives from the different parliamentary groups and appoints them to office upon a vote of investiture in the Congress of Deputies.

Some political corruption in Spain has been found.

=== Administrative divisions ===
==== Autonomous communities ====
Autonomous communities of Spain

Spain's autonomous communities are the first level administrative divisions of the country. They were created after the 1978 constitution came into effect in recognition of the right to self-government of the "nationalities and regions of Spain". The autonomous communities were to comprise adjacent provinces with common historical, cultural, and economic traits. This territorial organisation, based on devolution, is known in Spain as the "State of Autonomies" (Estado de las Autonomías).

The basic institutional law of each autonomous community is the Statute of Autonomy. The Statutes of Autonomy establish the name of the community according to its historical and contemporary identity, the limits of its territories, the name and organisation of the institutions of government and the rights they enjoy according to the constitution. This ongoing process of devolution means that, while officially a unitary state, Spain is nevertheless one of the most decentralised countries in Europe, along with federations like Belgium, Germany, and Switzerland.

Catalonia, Galicia and the Basque Country, which identified themselves as nationalities, were granted self-government through a rapid process. Andalusia also identified itself as a nationality in its first Statute of Autonomy, even though it followed the longer process stipulated in the constitution for the rest of the country. Progressively, other communities in revisions to their Statutes of Autonomy have also taken that denomination in accordance with their historical and modern identities, such as the Valencian Community, the Canary Islands, the Balearic Islands, and Aragon.

The autonomous communities have wide legislative and executive autonomy, with their own elected parliaments and governments as well as their own dedicated public administrations. The distribution of powers may be different for every community, as laid out in their Statutes of Autonomy, since devolution was intended to be asymmetrical. For instance, only two communities—the Basque Country and Navarre—have full fiscal autonomy based on ancient foral provisions. Each autonomous community is responsible for healthcare and education, among other public services.

Beyond these competencies, the nationalities—Andalusia, the Basque Country, Catalonia, and Galicia—were also devolved more powers than the other communities, among them the ability of the regional president to dissolve the parliament and call for elections at any time. In addition, the Basque Country, the Canary Islands, Catalonia, and Navarre each have autonomous police corps of their own: Ertzaintza, Policía Canaria, Mossos d'Esquadra, and Policía Foral respectively. Other communities have shared units with the National Police Corps or no regional police forces at all. (Note: See Law enforcement in Spain.)

==== Provinces and municipalities ====
Autonomous communities are divided into provinces, which serve as their territorial building blocks. Provinces are divided into municipalities. The existence of both the provinces and the municipalities is guaranteed and protected by the constitution, not necessarily by the Statutes of Autonomy themselves. Municipalities are granted autonomy to manage their internal affairs. Provinces are the territorial divisions designed to carry out the activities of the State.

The current provincial division structure is based—with minor changes—on the 1833 territorial division by Javier de Burgos. The Spanish territory is divided into 50 provinces. The communities of Asturias, Cantabria, La Rioja, the Balearic Islands, Madrid, Murcia and Navarre are the only communities that comprise a single province, which is coextensive with the community itself. In these cases, the administrative institutions of the province are replaced by the governmental institutions of the community.

=== Foreign relations ===
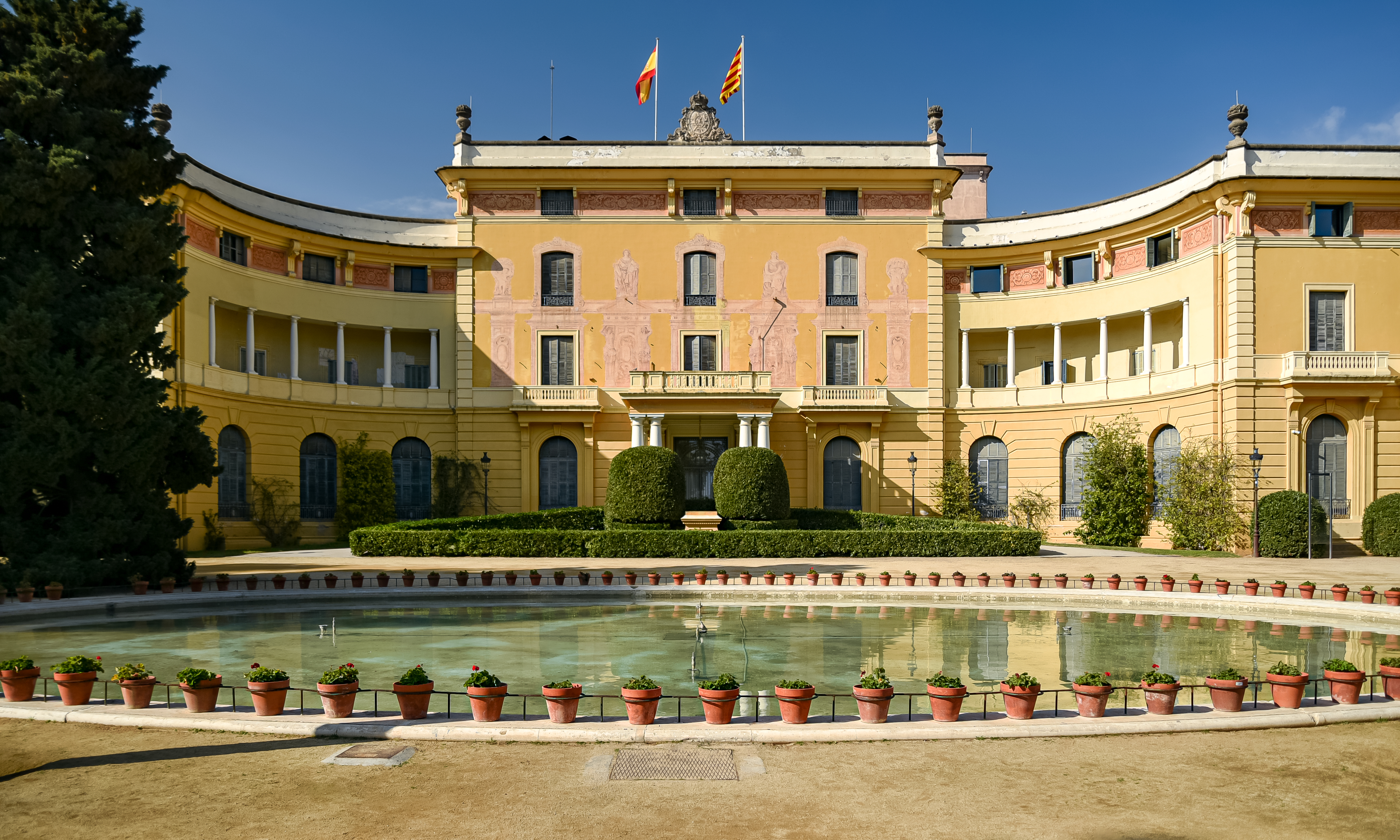
The Royal Palace of Pedralbes in Barcelona, headquarters of the Union for the Mediterranean

After the return of democracy following the death of Franco in 1975, Spain's foreign policy priorities were to break out of the diplomatic isolation of the Franco years and expand diplomatic relations, enter the European Community, and define security relations with the West.

As a member of NATO since 1982, Spain has established itself as a participant in multilateral international security activities. Spain's EU membership represents an important part of its foreign policy. On a wide range of issues, Spain often prefers to coordinate its efforts with its EU partners through the European political cooperation mechanisms. In addition to being represented via EU membership, Spain is a permanently invited guest to all G20 summits.

Spain has maintained its special relations with Hispanic America and the Philippines. Its policy emphasises the concept of an Ibero-American community, essentially the renewal of the concept of "Hispanidad" or "Hispanismo", as it is often referred to in English, which has sought to link the Iberian Peninsula with Hispanic America through language, commerce, history and culture. It is fundamentally "based on shared values and the recovery of democracy."

Spain is involved in a number of territorial disputes. Spain claims Gibraltar, an Overseas Territory of the United Kingdom, in the southernmost part of the Iberian Peninsula. Another dispute surrounds the Savage Islands; Spain claims that they are rocks rather than islands, and therefore does not accept the Portuguese Exclusive Economic Zone (200 nautical miles) generated by the islands. Spain claims sovereignty over the Perejil Island, a small, uninhabited rocky islet located in the South shore of the Strait of Gibraltar. It was the subject of an armed incident between Spain and Morocco in 2002. Morocco claims the Spanish cities of Ceuta and Melilla and the plazas de soberanía islets off the northern coast of Africa. Portugal does not recognise Spain's sovereignty over the territory of Olivenza.

In 1976, Spain withdrew from Western Sahara and informed the Secretary-General of the United Nations that it no longer considers itself responsible for the territory. Nonetheless, the criminal division of the Audiencia Nacional ruled in 2014 that Spain remains as Western Sahara's de jure administering power. This position is shared by the United Nations, the African Union, and several jurists. Additionally, Spain continues to manage Western Saharan airspace.

=== Military ===
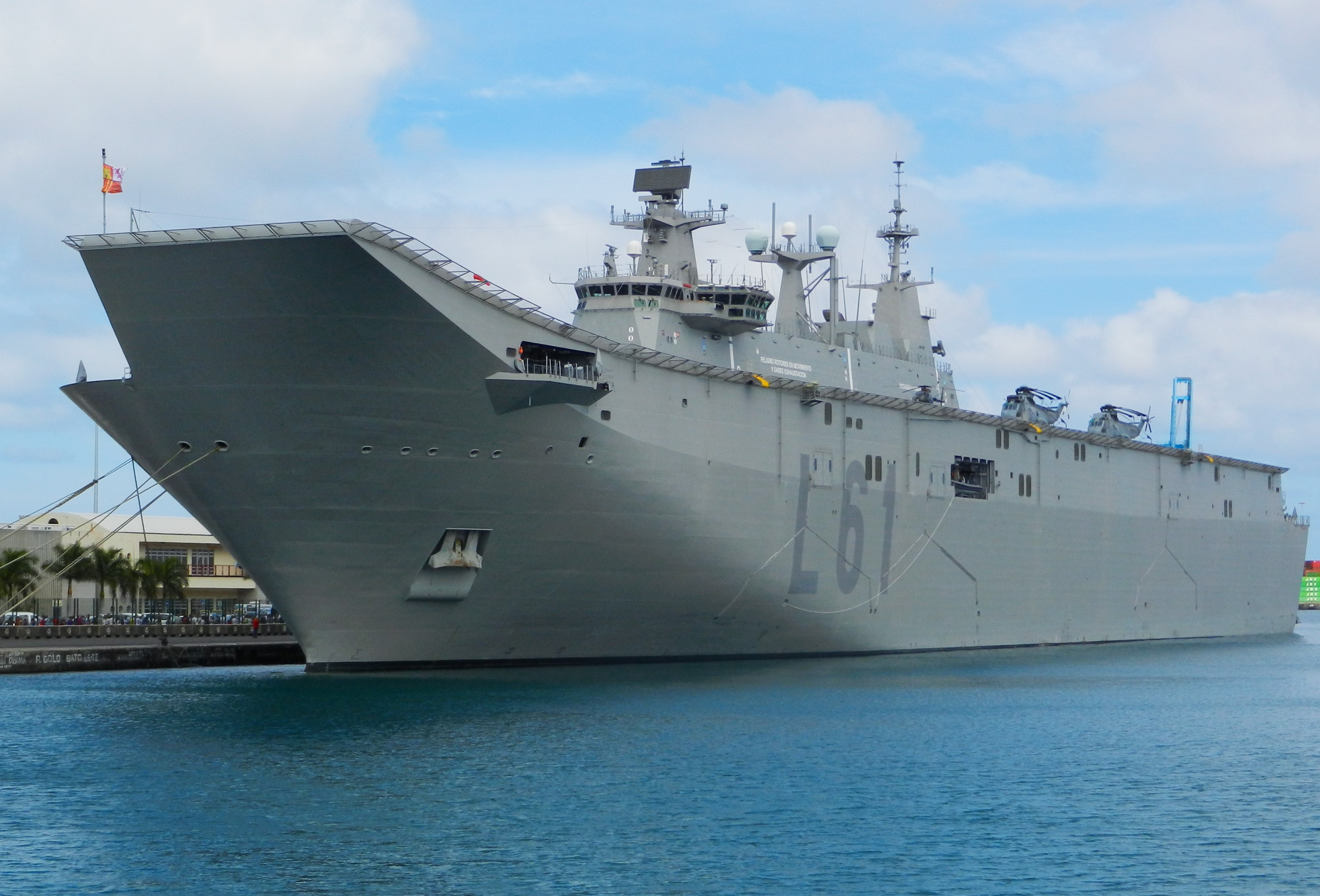
Amphibious assault ship-aircraft carrier Juan Carlos I

The Spanish Armed Forces are divided into three branches: Army (Ejército de Tierra); Navy (Armada); and Air and Space Force (Ejército del Aire y del Espacio). The armed forces of Spain are known as the Spanish Armed Forces (Fuerzas Armadas Españolas). Their commander-in-chief is the King of Spain, Felipe VI. The next military authorities in line are the Prime Minister and the Minister of Defence. The fourth military authority of the State is the Chief of the Defence Staff (JEMAD). The Defence Staff (Estado Mayor de la Defensa) assists the JEMAD as auxiliary body.

The Spanish armed forces are a professional force with a strength in 2017 of 121,900 active personnel and 4,770 reserve personnel. Spain also has the 77,000 strong Civil Guard which comes under the control of the Ministry of defence in times of a national emergency. In 2015, the Spanish defence budget was 5.71 billion euros (US$7.2 billion), with a 1% increase. The increase comes because of security concerns. Military conscription ended in 2001.

According to the 2024 Global Peace Index, Spain is the 23rd most peaceful country in the world.

=== Human rights ===
The Spanish Constitution of 1978 "protect all Spaniards and all the peoples of Spain in the exercise of human rights, their cultures and traditions, languages and institutions". According to Amnesty International (AI), government investigations of alleged police abuses are often lengthy and punishments were light. Violence against women was a problem, which the Government took steps to address. Spain provides one of the highest degrees of liberty in the world for its LGBT community. Among the countries studied by Pew Research in 2013, Spain is rated first in acceptance of homosexuality, with 88% of those surveyed saying that homosexuality should be accepted.

The Cortes Generales approved the Gender Equality Act in 2007 aimed at furthering equality between genders in Spanish political and economic life. According to Inter-Parliamentary Union data for September 2018, 137 of the 350 members of the Congress were women (39.1%), while in the Senate, there were 101 women out of 266 (39.9%), placing Spain 16th on their list of countries ranked by proportion of women in the lower (or single) House. In 2008, the Gender Empowerment Measure of Spain in the United Nations Human Development Report was 0.794, 12th in the world.

== Economy ==
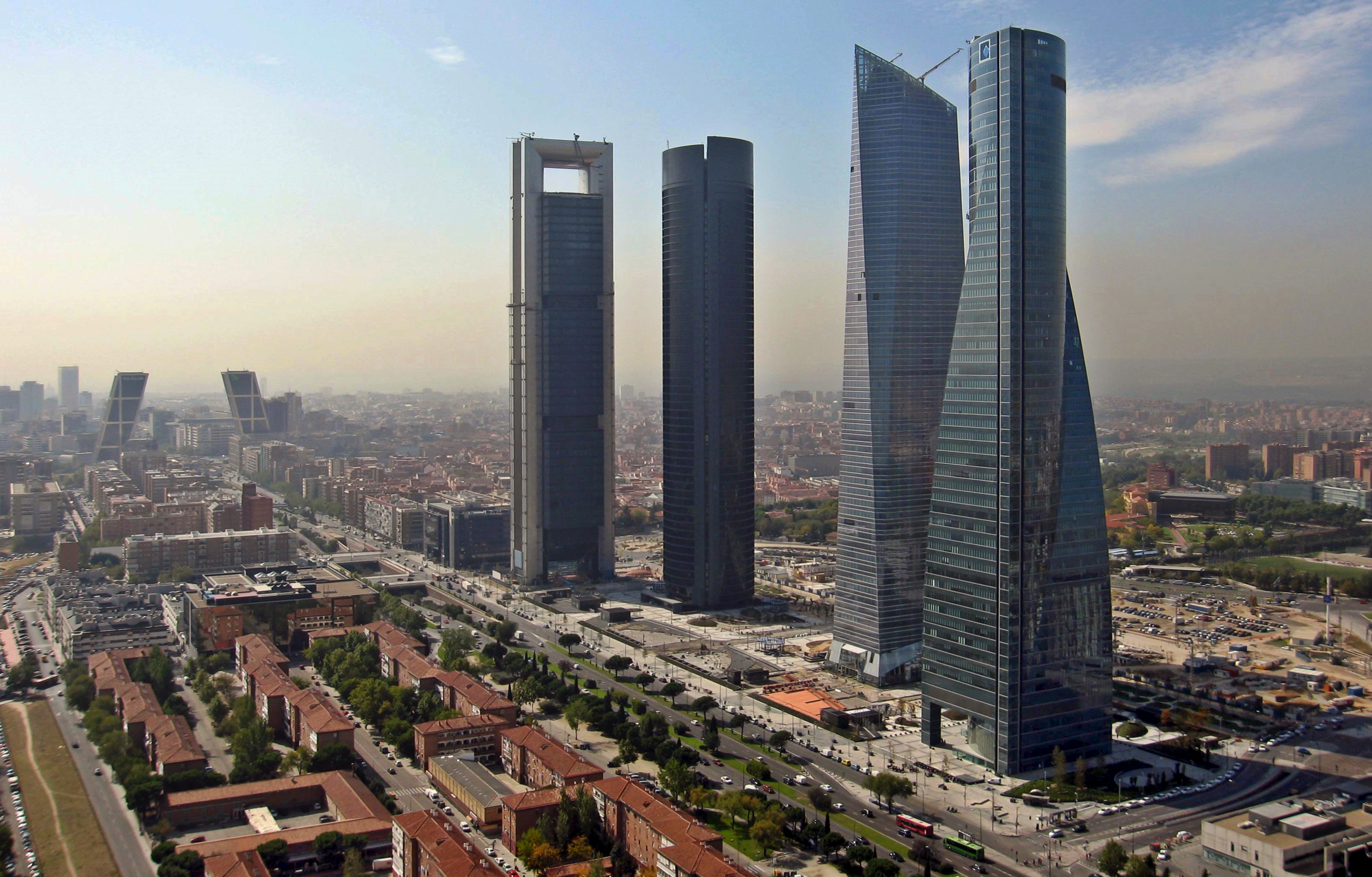
The Cuatro Torres Business Area in Madrid

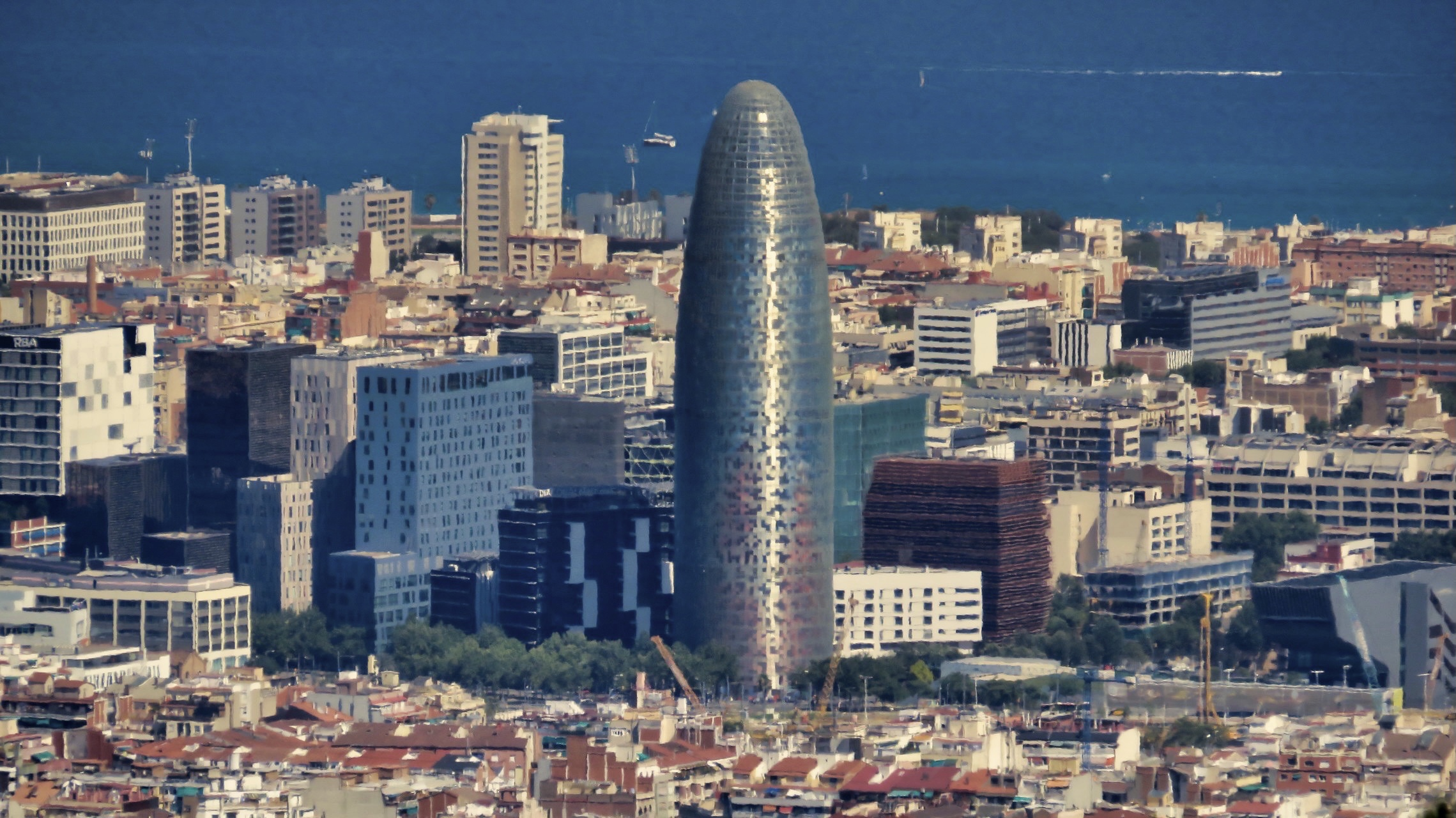
Torre Glòries and the 22@ business district in Barcelona

Spain has a mixed economy that combines elements of free-market capitalism with social welfare and state intervention. It is one of 21 countries with a nominal gross domestic product (GDP) exceeding $1 trillion per year, ranking 12th largest worldwide and fourth largest both in the European Union and within the eurozone. Spain is classified as a high-income economy by the World Bank and an advanced economy by the International Monetary Fund. As of 2024, it is the fastest growing major advanced economy in the world, growing nearly four times higher than the eurozone average.

Spain began industrialising in the late 18th century, albeit more gradually and unevenly than other European countries; industry was limited mostly to Catalonia (primarily textile manufacturing) and the Basque Country (iron and steel production). Overall economic growth was slower than in most major western European countries, and Spain remained relatively underdeveloped by the early 20th century.

The Spanish Civil War, followed by failed autarkic and interventionist policies that were worsened by international isolation, left the economy on the brink of collapse by the late 1950s. Technocratic reforms were enacted to avert the crisis, laying the groundwork for the Spanish economic miracle, a period of rapid growth from 1960 until 1974, during which Spain's economy grew an average of 6.6 percent per year, exceeding every country except Japan.

Since its transition to democracy in the late 1970s, Spain has generally sought to liberalise its economy and deepen regional and international integration. It joined the European Economic Community—now the European Union—in 1986 and implemented policies and reforms that allowed for its participation in the inaugural launch of the euro in 1999. Spain's largest trade and investment partners are within the EU and eurozone, including its four largest export markets; EU membership also coincided with a tripling of foreign direct investment from 1990 to 2000. Spain was among the countries affected most by the 2008 financial crisis and subsequent European debt crisis, leading to the 2008–2014 Spanish financial crisis.

Spain has long struggled with high unemployment, which has never fallen below 8% since the 1980s. In 2013, unemployment hit a peak of 27%. It stood at 9.93% in January 2026, the lowest since 2008. Youth unemployment is particularly severe by both global and regional standards; at 24.90% (as of January 2025), it is the highest among EU members and well above the EU average of 14.6%. Perennial weak points of Spain's economy include a large informal economy; an education system that performs poorly compared to most developed countries; and low rates of private sector investment. Median equivalised disposable income was $26,630 per year (2021, PPP).

Since the 1990s, which saw a wave of privatisations, several Spanish companies have reached multinational status; they maintain a strong and leading presence in Latin America—where Spain is the second largest foreign investor after the United States—but have also expanded into Asia, especially China and India. As of 2023, Spain was home to eight of the 500 largest companies in the world by annual revenue, according to the Fortune Global 500; these include Banco Santander, the 14th-largest banking institution in the world; electric utility Iberdrola, the world's largest renewable energy operator; and Telefónica, one of the largest telephone operators and mobile network providers. Twenty Spanish companies are listed in the 2023 Forbes Global 2000 ranking of the 2,000 largest public companies, reflecting diverse sectors such as construction (ACS Group), aviation (ENAIRE), pharmaceuticals (Grifols), and transportation (Ferrovial). Additionally, one of Spain's largest private sector entities is Mondragon Corporation, the world's largest worker-owned cooperative.

The automotive industry is one of the largest employers in the country and a major contributor to economic growth, accounting for one-tenth of gross domestic product and 18% of total exports (including vehicles and auto-parts). In 2023, Spain produced 2.45 million automobiles—of which over 2.1 million were exported abroad—ranking eighth in the world and second in Europe (after Germany) by total number. In total, 89% of vehicles and 60% of auto-parts manufactured in Spain were exported worldwide in 2023; the total external trade surplus of vehicles alone reached €18.8bn in 2023. Overall, the automotive industry supports nearly two million jobs, or nine percent of the labour force.

=== Tourism ===
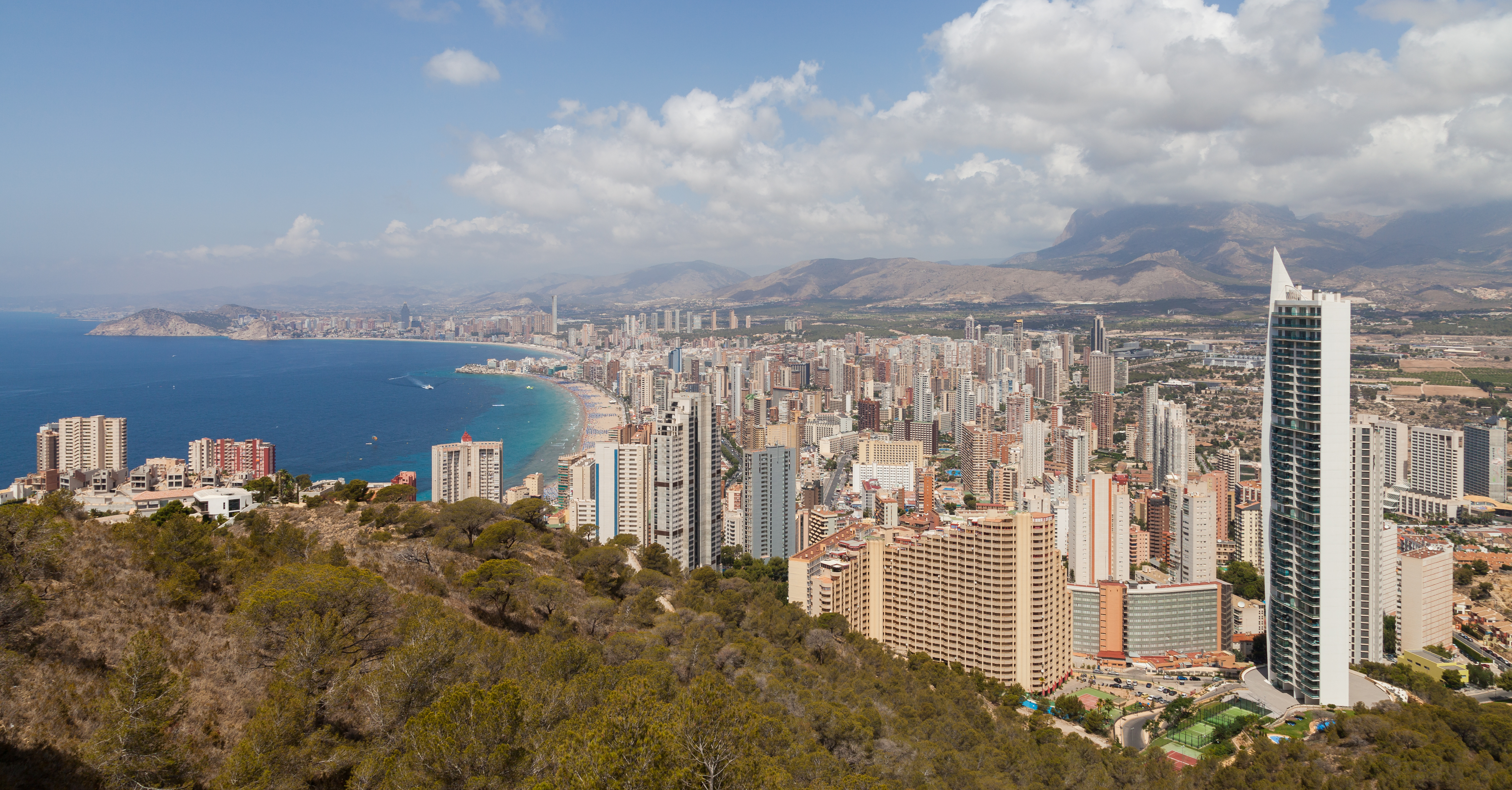
Benidorm, one of Europe's largest coastal tourist destinations

In 2024, Spain was the second most visited country in the world only behind France, recording 94 million tourists. The international tourist expenditure in 2024 was around 126 billion euros. The headquarters of the World Tourism Organization are located in Madrid. Tourism in Spain is a major contributor to national economic life, with foreign and domestic tourism contributing to 12.3% of Spain's GDP in 2023.

Castile and León is the Spanish leader in rural tourism linked to its environmental and architectural heritage which it has kept since 2020.

=== Energy ===
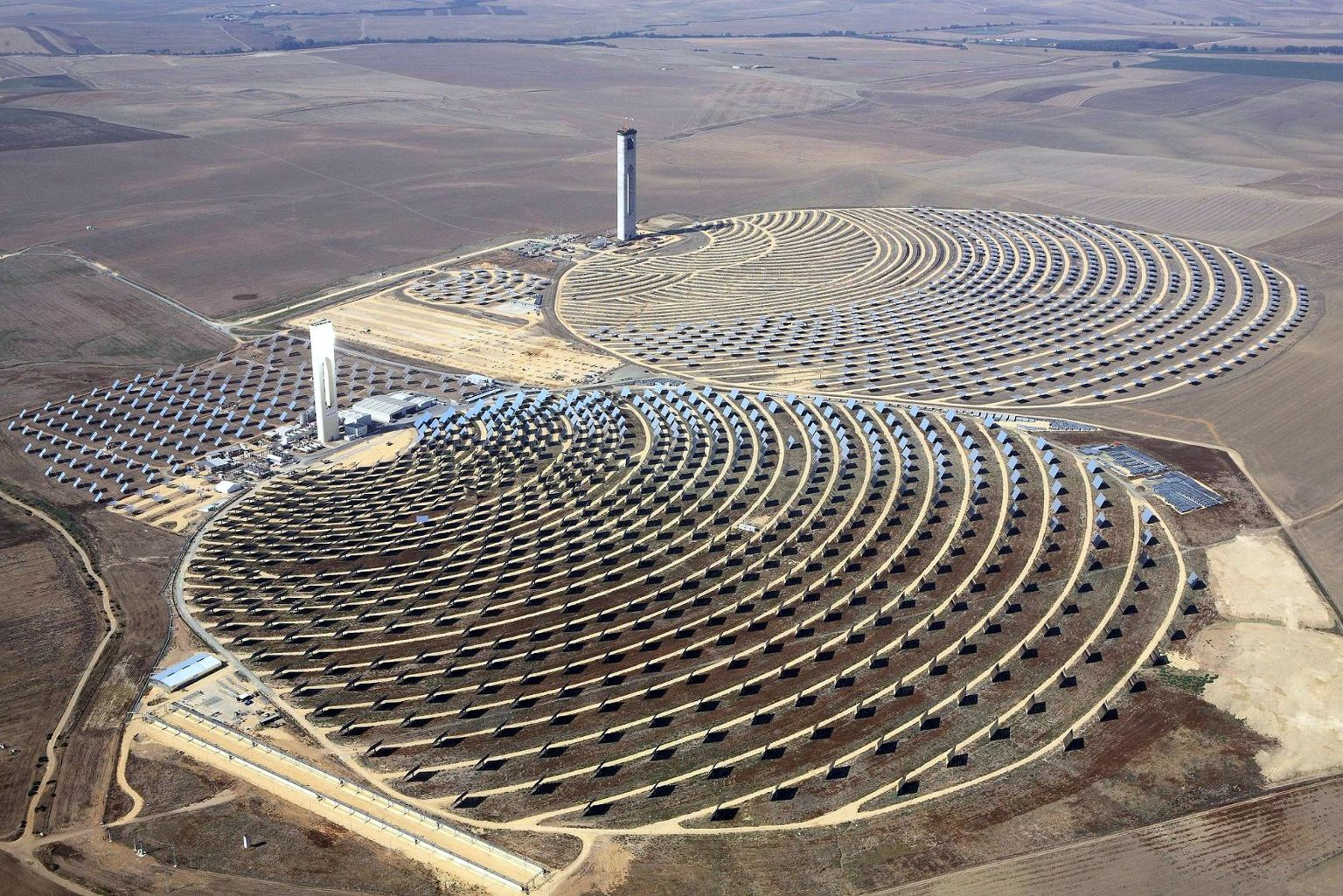
The Solucar Complex, with the PS10 Solar Power Plant in the foreground and the PS20 in the background

In 2010 Spain became the solar power world leader when it overtook the United States with a massive power station plant called La Florida, near Alvarado, Badajoz. Spain is also Europe's main producer of wind energy. In 2010 its wind turbines generated 16.4% of all electrical energy produced in Spain.

In November 2010, wind power reached a historic peak, covering 53% of mainland electricity demand and generating 14.2 GW of power, equivalent to that of fourteen nuclear reactors. Other renewable energies used in Spain are hydroelectric, biomass and marine.

Non-renewable energy sources used in Spain are nuclear (eight operative reactors), gas, coal, and oil. Fossil fuels together generated 58% of Spain's electricity in 2009, just below the OECD mean of 61%. Nuclear power generated another 19%, and wind and hydro about 12% each.

=== Science and technology ===
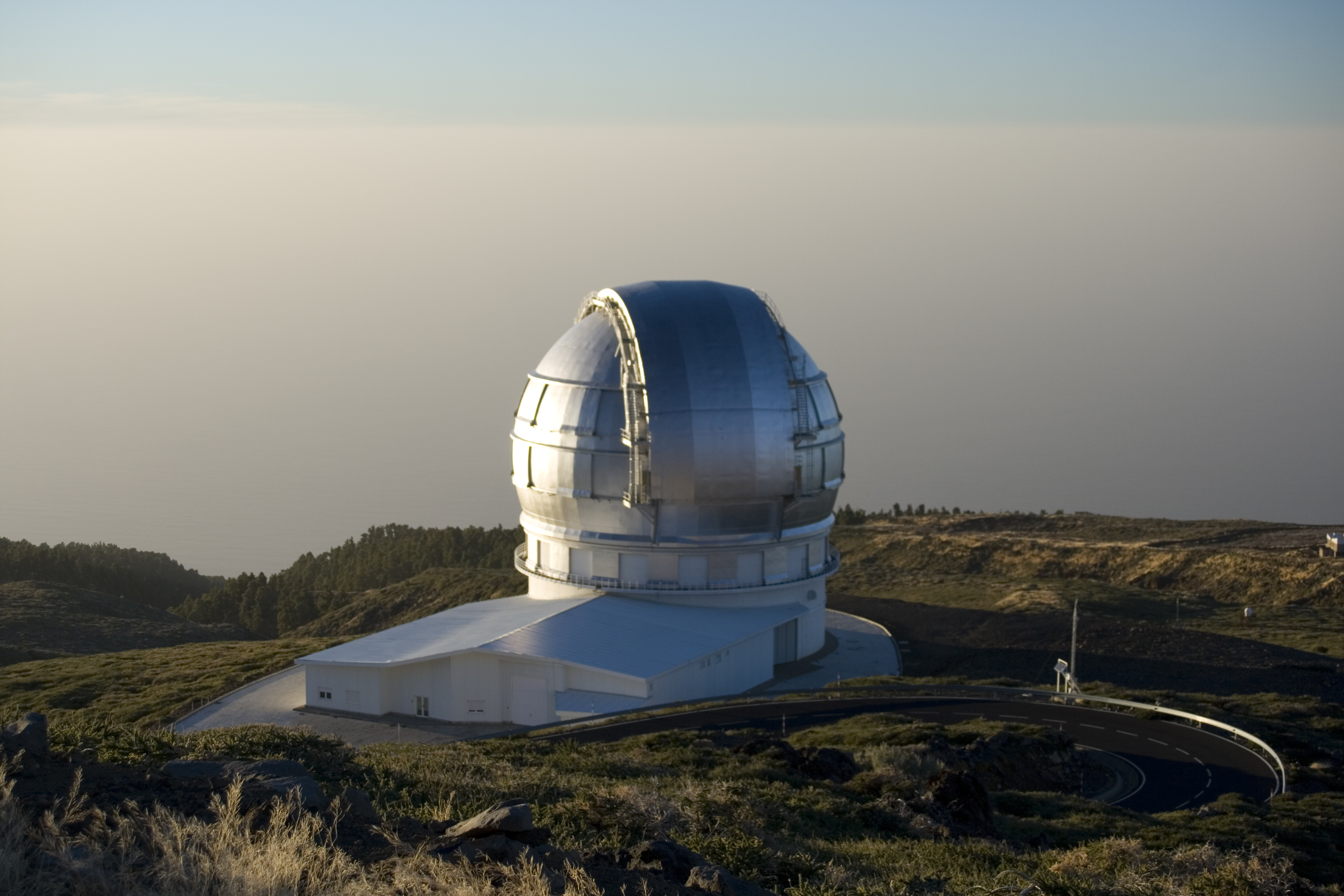
The Gran Telescopio Canarias at sunset

The Consejo Superior de Investigaciones Científicas (CSIC) is the leading public agency dedicated to scientific research in the country. It ranked as the 5th top governmental scientific institution worldwide (and 32nd overall) in the 2018 SCImago Institutions Rankings. Spain was ranked 29th in the Global Innovation Index in 2025.

Higher education institutions perform about a 60% of the basic research in the country. Likewise, the contribution of the private sector to R&D expenditures is much lower than in other EU and OECD countries.

=== Transport ===
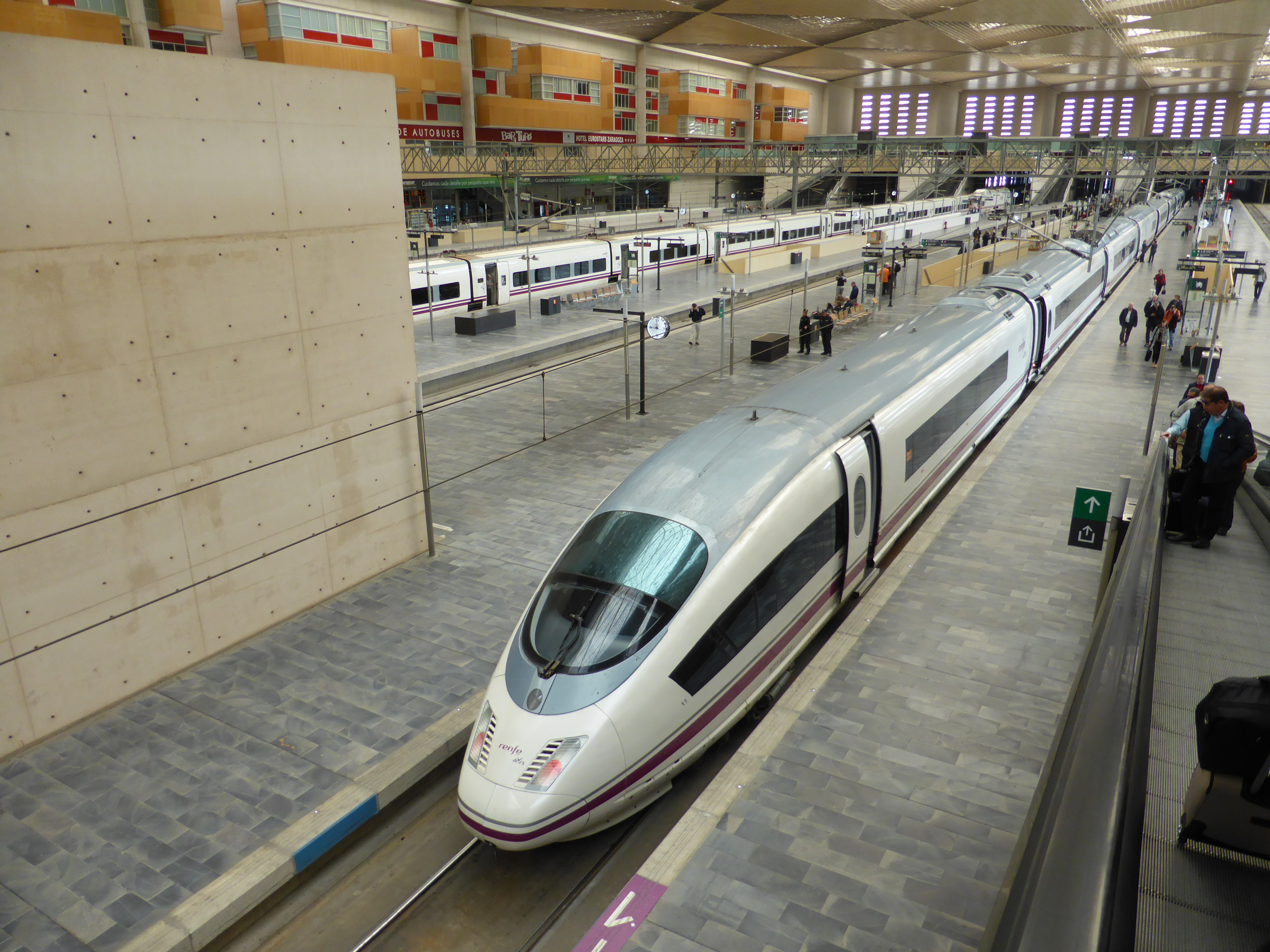
A high-speed AVE Class 103 train in Zaragoza station. Spain has the longest high-speed rail network in Europe.

The Spanish road system is mainly centralised, with six highways connecting Madrid to the Basque Country, Catalonia, Valencia, West Andalusia, Extremadura and Galicia. There are highways along the Atlantic (Ferrol to Vigo), Cantabrian (Oviedo to San Sebastián) and Mediterranean (Girona to Cádiz) coasts. Spain aims to put one million electric cars on the road by 2014 as part of the government's plan to save energy and boost energy efficiency. The former Minister of Industry Miguel Sebastián said that "the electric vehicle is the future and the engine of an industrial revolution."

As of February 2025, the Spanish high-speed rail network is the longest HSR network in Europe with 3,973 km (2,469 mi) and the second longest in the world, after China's. It is linking Málaga, Seville, Madrid, Barcelona, Valencia and Valladolid, with the trains operated at commercial speeds up to 330 km/h (210 mph). On average, the Spanish high-speed train is the fastest one in the world, followed by the Japanese bullet train and the French TGV. Regarding punctuality, it is second in the world (98.5% on-time arrival) after the Japanese Shinkansen (99%).

There are 49 public airports in Spain. The busiest one is the airport of Madrid (Barajas), with 60 million passengers in 2023, being the world's 15th busiest airport, as well as the European Union's third busiest. The airport of Barcelona (El Prat) is also important, with 50 million passengers in 2024, being the world's 30th-busiest airport. Other main airports are located in Mallorca, Málaga, Las Palmas (Gran Canaria), and Alicante.

== Demographics ==
The population density by municipality in Spain, 2018

Population pyramid of Spain, 2021

In January 2026, Spain had a population of 49,570,725 people. That same month, people born in Spain accounted for 80.7% of the total population and people born abroad accounted for 19.3% of the total population. Spain's population density, at 98/km^{2} (253.8/sq mi), is lower than that of most Western European countries, and its distribution across the territory is highly uneven. With the notable exception of the region surrounding the capital, Madrid, the most densely populated areas are located along the coast. The population of Spain has risen 2 1/2 times since 1900, when it stood at 18.6 million, principally due to the spectacular demographic boom in the 1960s and early 1970s.

In 2024, Spain's total fertility rate (TFR) stood at 1.10 children per woman, the second lowest in the European Union after Malta and among the lowest worldwide. This rate is well below the replacement level of 2.1 and contrasts sharply with the historical maximum of 5.11 children per woman recorded in 1865. As a result, Spain has one of the oldest populations globally, with a median age of 46.8 years.

After the birth rate plunged in the 1980s and Spain's population growth rate dropped, the population again trended upward initially upon the return of many Spaniards who had emigrated to other European countries during the 1970s, and more recently, fuelled by large numbers of immigrants who make up more than 19% of the population today: Among non-EU immigrants, they are mainly from Latin America (39%), North Africa (16%), Eastern Europe (15%), and Sub-Saharan Africa (4%).

In 2024, the number of foreign residents who acquired Spanish nationality increased by 5.1% to 252,476. The most frequent nationalities of origin were Morocco (42,910), Venezuela (30,403) and Colombia (26,224). Spain has a number of descendants of populations from former colonies, especially Latin America and North Africa. Smaller numbers of immigrants from several Sub-Saharan countries have recently been settling in Spain. There are also sizeable numbers of Asian immigrants, most of whom are of Middle Eastern, South Asian and Chinese origin. The single largest group of immigrants are European; represented by large numbers of Romanians, Britons, Germans, French and others.

=== Urbanisation ===
In 2023, approximately 81.6% of Spain's population lived in urban areas, reflecting a continuing trend of urbanisation that has characterised Spain's demographic landscape in recent decades. This concentration has contributed to the dominance of urban areas in economic, political, and cultural spheres.

Largest cities or towns in Spain National Statistics Institute (2025)
Rank	Name	Autonomous community	Pop.	Rank	Name	Autonomous community	Pop.
1	Madrid	Community of Madrid	3,477,497	11	Bilbao	Basque Country	350,975
2	Barcelona	Catalonia	1,713,247	12	Córdoba	Andalusia	324,159
3	Valencia	Valencian Community	841,558	13	Valladolid	Castile and León	301,798
4	Zaragoza	Aragon	699,007	14	Vigo	Galicia	295,735
5	Seville	Andalusia	688,714	15	L'Hospitalet	Catalonia	292,161
6	Málaga	Andalusia	597,173	16	Gijón	Principality of Asturias	271,259
7	Murcia	Region of Murcia	477,631	17	Vitoria-Gasteiz	Basque Country	260,402
8	Palma	Balearic Islands	443,196	18	A Coruña	Galicia	251,277
9	Las Palmas	Canary Islands	384,023	19	Elche	Valencian Community	245,575
10	Alicante	Valencian Community	365,586	20	Granada	Andalusia	235,294

=== Migration ===
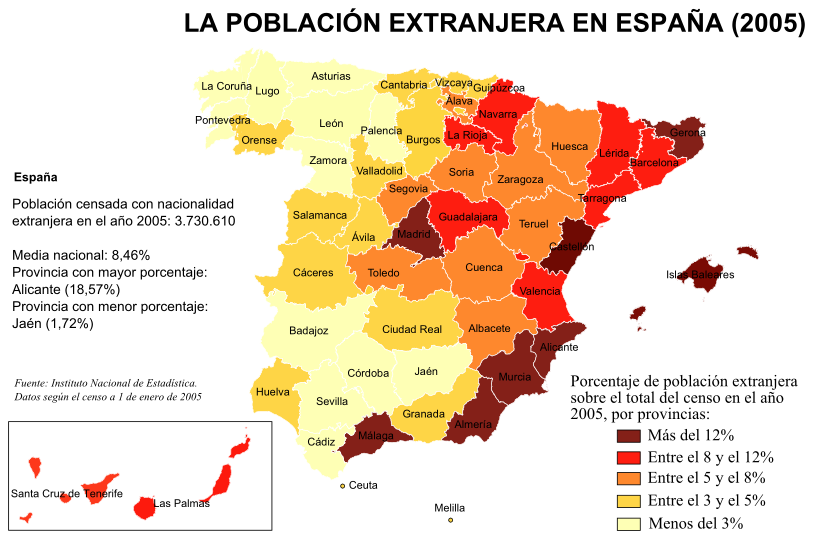
Distribution of the foreign population in Spain in 2005 by percentage

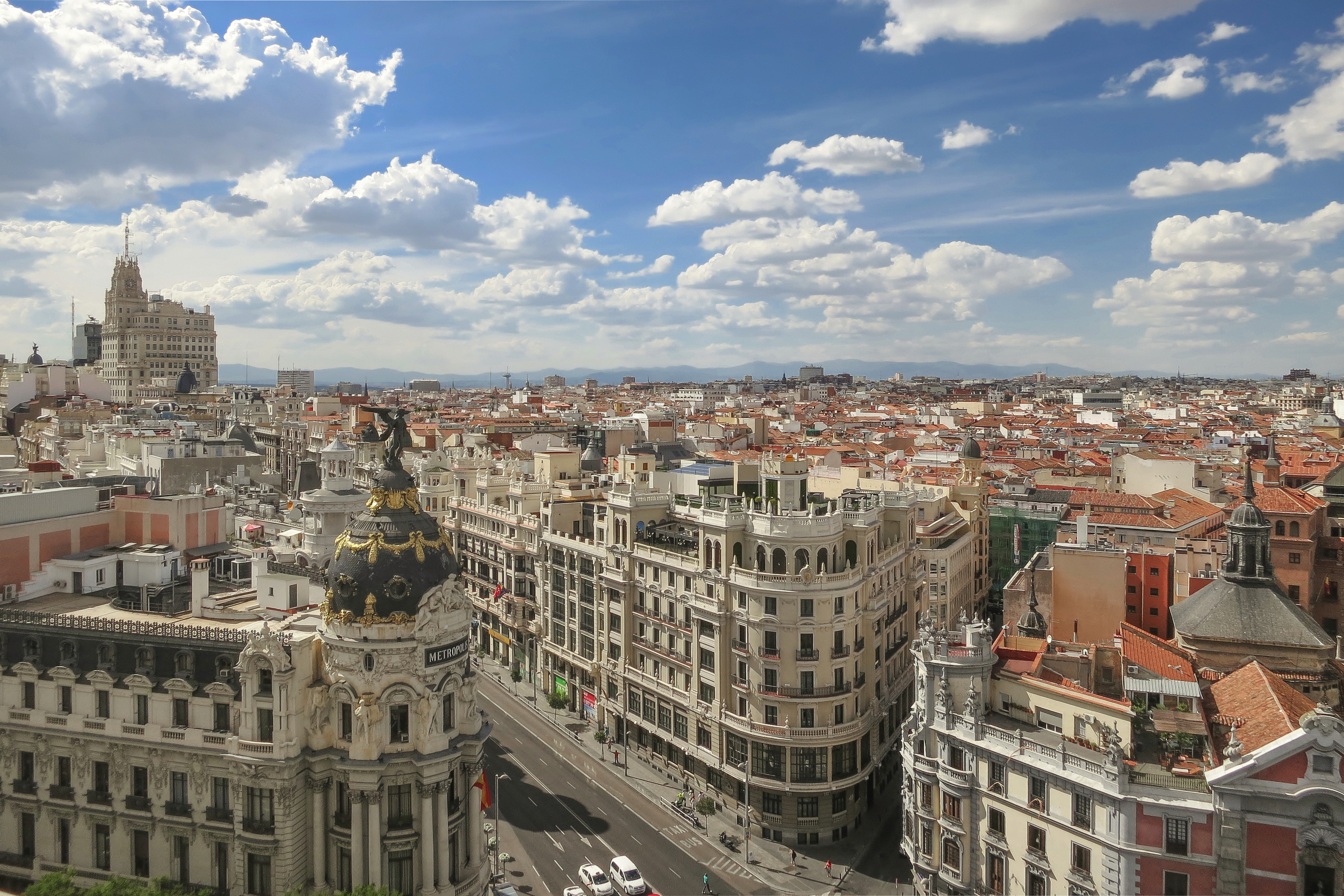
Madrid, the 2nd biggest metropolitan area in the European Union, is home to over a million Latin Americans.

As of January 2026, over ten million people in Spain were born abroad, accounting for 20.3% of the total population. Among them, over seven million (15.4%) were born outside Europe, and more than seven million (14.3%) held foreign nationality. By number of immigrants, Spain ranks fourth in Europe and seventh worldwide.

As of December 2024, the largest source of immigrants was Morocco (over one million), Colombia (856,616), Venezuela (599,769), Romania (532,456), and Ecuador (448,643). Most immigrants come from outside the EU, especially Latin America, with sizeable populations from the United Kingdom, Ukraine, China, Russia, Pakistan, Algeria, and Senegal.

Historically a land of emigration, immigration to Spain has increased markedly since the 21st century, with immigrants rising from 1.6% of the population in 1998 to over 12% by 2009; in absolute terms, the number of immigrants grew from 500,000 in 1996 to 5.2 million in 2008. Spain was Europe's top recipient of migrants from 2002 to 2007, with 2.5 million arrivals. In 2005, Spain had the second highest immigration rate in the European Union, after Cyprus, and the highest in absolute numbers, with an amnesty programme increasing the legal immigrant population by 700,000.

The very high level of immigration is driven by Spain's cultural ties with Latin America, its geographical position, the porosity of its borders, the large size of its underground economy, and the strength of the agricultural and construction sectors, which demand more low-cost labour than can be offered by the national workforce. A large number of EU residents retire to Spain's Mediterranean coast; in 2008, prior to the onset of the economic crisis, the Financial Times reported that Spain was the most favoured destination for Western Europeans considering a move from their own country and seeking jobs elsewhere in the EU.

Until 2014, the number of immigrants decreased due to the economic crisis, with more than half a million people leaving Spain in 2011 alone—the first net migration rate in decades. However, notwithstanding economic factors, as well as policies to encourage non-EU unemployed immigrants to voluntarily depart the country, the rate of emigration remained relatively low. By 2015, net immigration had increased, and Spain has again become a major immigration destination, backed by government policies to increase the labour force and promote integration. The Sánchez government planned to legalize around 900,000 undocumented migrants by 2027.

In late July 2026, there was a mass crossing of migrants from Morocco into Ceuta, with at least 141 fatalities among those attempting to reach Spain. By 3 August, Spanish government officials said about 70,000 people had voluntarily returned to Morocco.

=== Languages ===
A map of Spain's languages

Spain is a multilingual state. Spanish—featured in the 1978 Spanish Constitution as castellano ('Castilian')—has effectively been the official language of the entire country since 1931. As allowed in the third article of the Constitution, the other 'Spanish languages' can also become official in their respective autonomous communities. The territoriality created by the form of co-officiality codified in the 1978 Constitution creates an asymmetry, in which Spanish speakers' rights apply to the entire territory whereas vis-à-vis the rest of co-official languages, their speakers' rights only apply in their territories.

Other territorialised languages include Aragonese, Aranese Occitan, Astur-Leonese, Basque, Ceutan Arabic (Darija), Catalan/Valencian, Galician, Portuguese and Tamazight. Romani Caló and the sign languages are also used. The number of speakers varies widely and their legal recognition is uneven, with some of the most vulnerable languages lacking any sort of effective protection. Those enjoying recognition as an official language in some autonomous communities include Catalan/Valencian (in Catalonia and the Balearic Islands officially named as Catalan and in the Valencian Community officially named as Valencian); Galician (in Galicia); Basque (in the Basque Country and part of Navarre); and Aranese in Catalonia.

In 2021, Spanish was the first language of 81.53% of the population, Catalan/Valencian was 10.50%, Galician was 3.77% and Basque was 1.42%. The most spoken foreign language was Arabic with 2.17% of the population considering it as their first language, followed by English with 1.58%, Romanian with 1.44%, French with 0.94%, Portuguese with 0.54%, Chinese with 0.48%, German with 0.44% and Italian with 0.41%. Such diversity of foreign languages is mainly due to international migration.

Spanish is the world's second-most spoken native language and the world's most widely spoken Romance language.

=== Education ===
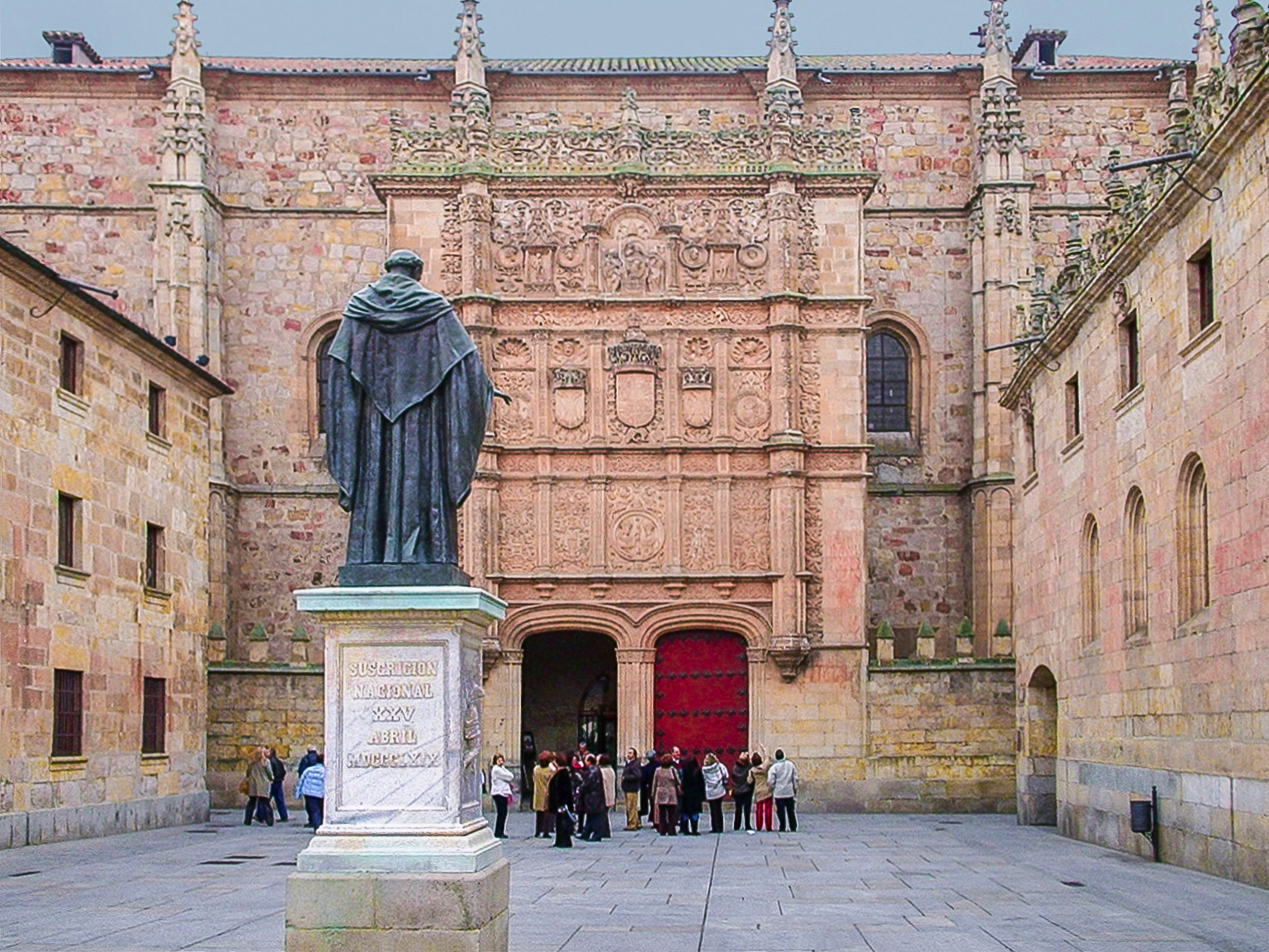
The University of Salamanca, one of the first European universities

State education in Spain is free and compulsory from the age of six to sixteen. The education system is regulated by the 2006 educational law, LOE (Ley Orgánica de Educación), or Fundamental Law for the Education. In 2014, the LOE was partially modified by the newer and controversial LOMCE law (Ley Orgánica para la Mejora de la Calidad Educativa), or Fundamental Law for the Improvement of the Education System, commonly called Ley Wert (Wert Law). Since 1970 to 2014, Spain has had seven different educational laws (LGE, LOECE, LODE, LOGSE, LOPEG, LOE and LOMCE).

The levels of education are preschool education, primary education, secondary education and post-16 education. In regards to the professional development education or the vocational education, there are three levels besides the university degrees: the Formación Profesional Básica (basic vocational education); the Ciclo Formativo de Grado Medio or CFGM (medium level vocation education) which can be studied after studying the secondary education, and the Ciclo Formativo de Grado Superior or CFGS (higher level vocational education), which can be studied after studying the post-16 education level.

In 2021, the Programme for International Student Assessment (PISA) coordinated by the OECD ranked the overall knowledge and skills of Spanish 15-year-olds as significantly below the OECD average of 493 in reading literacy, mathematics, and science.

=== Health ===
The health care system of Spain, the Spanish National Health System, is considered one of the best in the world, ranked 7th position by the World Health Organisation in 2000. The health care is public, universal and free for any legal citizen of Spain. Health spending is 9.4% of GDP, slightly above the average of 9.3% of the OECD. The life expectancy in Spain has improved from 79.1 years in 2000 to 82.7 years in 2021.

=== Religion ===
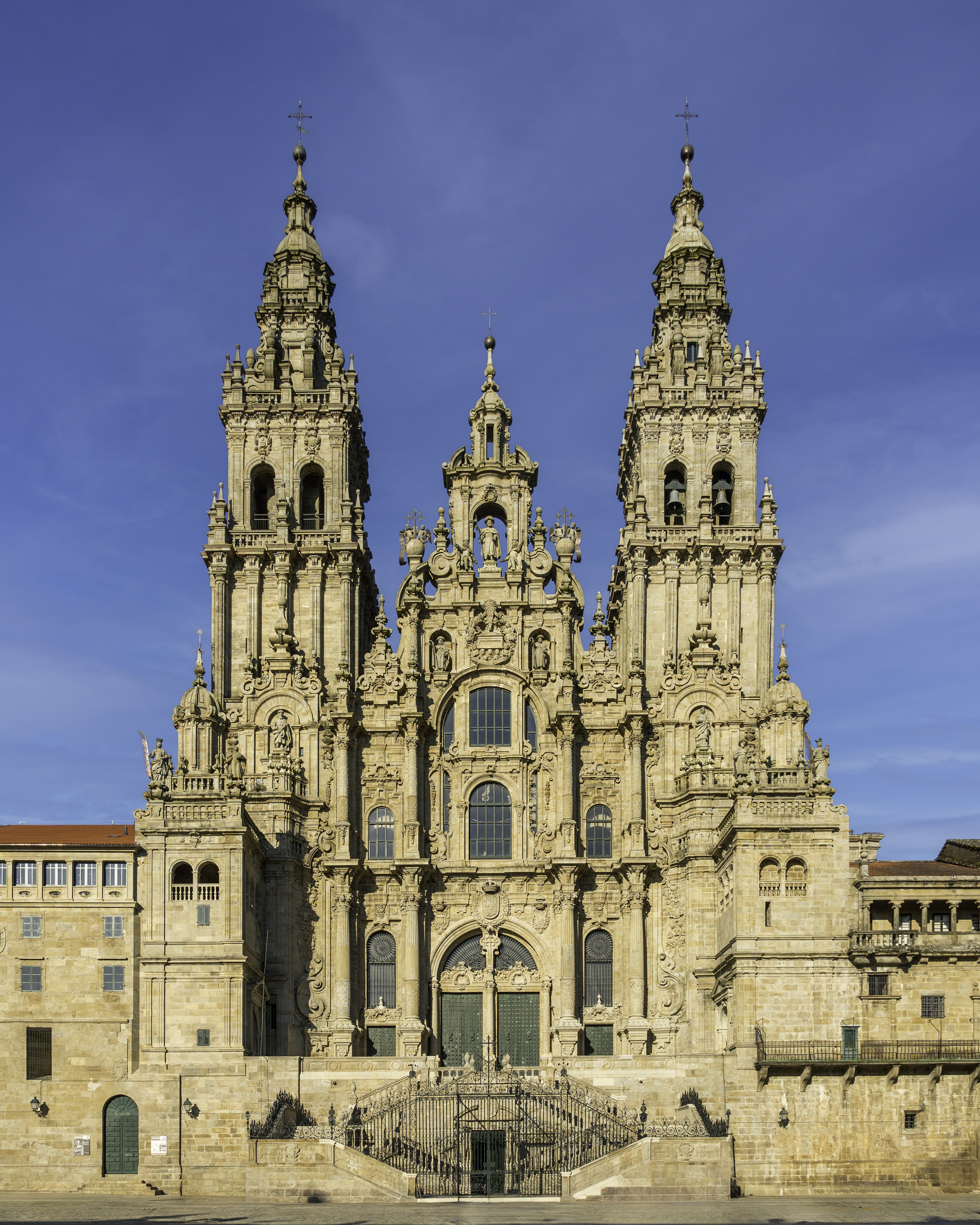
The Santiago de Compostela Cathedral

Roman Catholicism, which has a long history in Spain, remains the dominant religion. Although it no longer has official status by law, in all public schools in Spain students have to choose either a religion or ethics class. Catholicism is the religion most commonly taught, although the teaching of Islam, Judaism, and evangelical Christianity is also recognised in law. Recent polls and surveys suggest that around 30% of the Spanish population is irreligious.

The Spanish constitution enshrines secularism in governance, as well as freedom of religion or belief for all, saying that no religion should have a "state character", while allowing for the state to "cooperate" with religious groups. Protestant churches have about 1,200,000 members. There are about 105,000 Jehovah's Witnesses. The Church of Jesus Christ of Latter-day Saints has approximately 46,000 adherents in 133 congregations.

A 2019 study made by the Union of Islamic Communities of Spain demonstrated that there were more than 2,100,000 inhabitants of Muslim background living in Spain, accounting for 4–5% of the population of Spain. The vast majority was composed of immigrants and descendants originating from the Maghreb, especially Morocco, and other African countries. More than 879,000 (42%) of them had Spanish nationality.

Judaism was practically non-existent in Spain from the 1492 expulsion until the 19th century, when Jews were again permitted to enter the country. Currently, there are around 62,000 Jews in Spain, or 0.14% of the total population.

== Culture ==
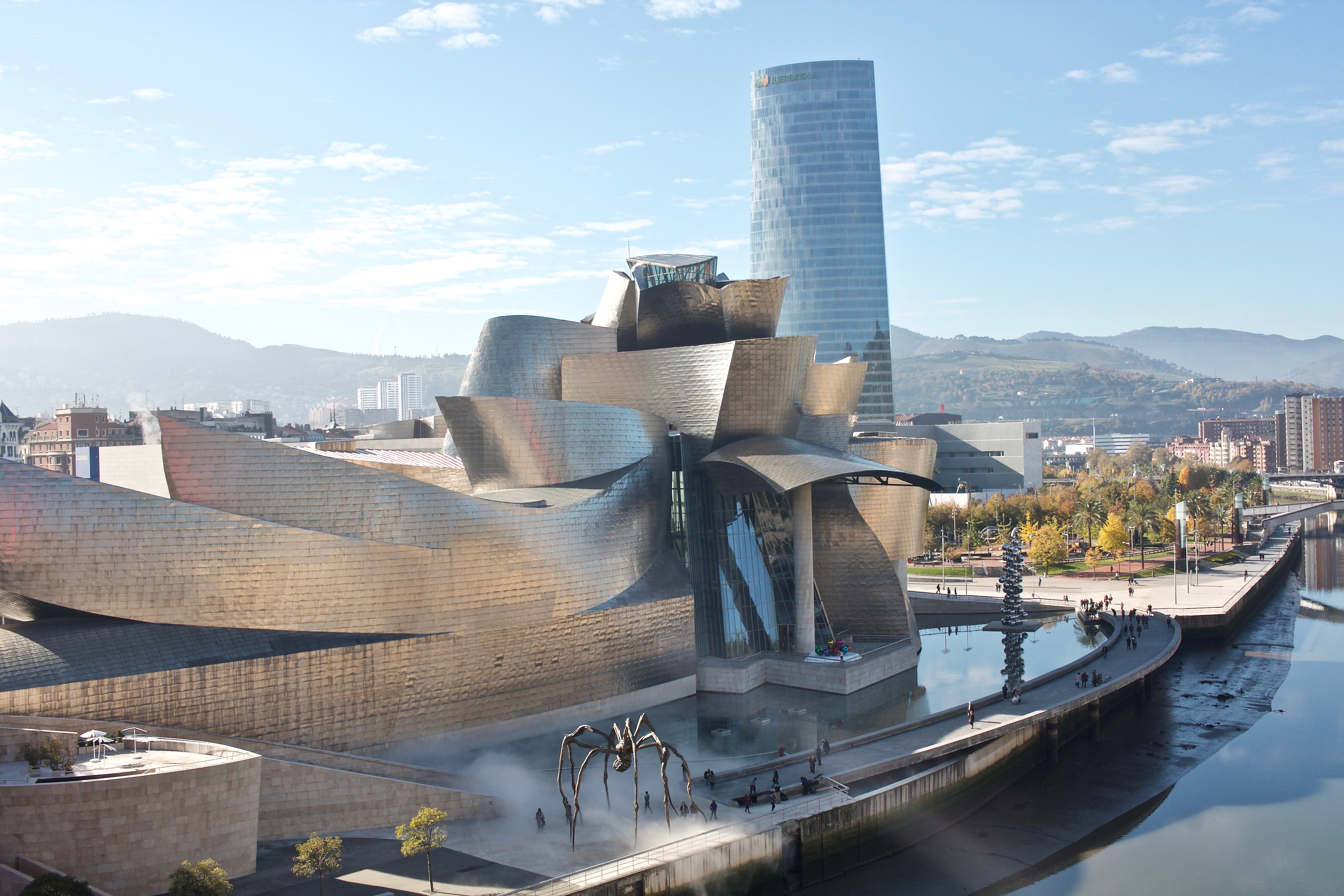
Guggenheim Museum Bilbao

Spain is a Western country and one of the major Latin countries of Europe, and has been noted for its international cultural influence. Spanish culture is marked by strong historic ties to the Catholic Church, which played a pivotal role in the country's formation and subsequent identity. Spanish art, architecture, cuisine, and music have been shaped by successive waves of foreign invaders, as well as by the country's Mediterranean climate and geography. The centuries-long colonial era globalised Spanish language and culture, with Spain also absorbing the cultural and commercial products of its diverse empire.

Bullfighting is widely regarded as one of Spain's most iconic cultural and artistic traditions, although it remains a subject of ongoing social and political debate. In 2013, it was officially recognized as part of the country's cultural heritage.

=== World Heritage Sites ===
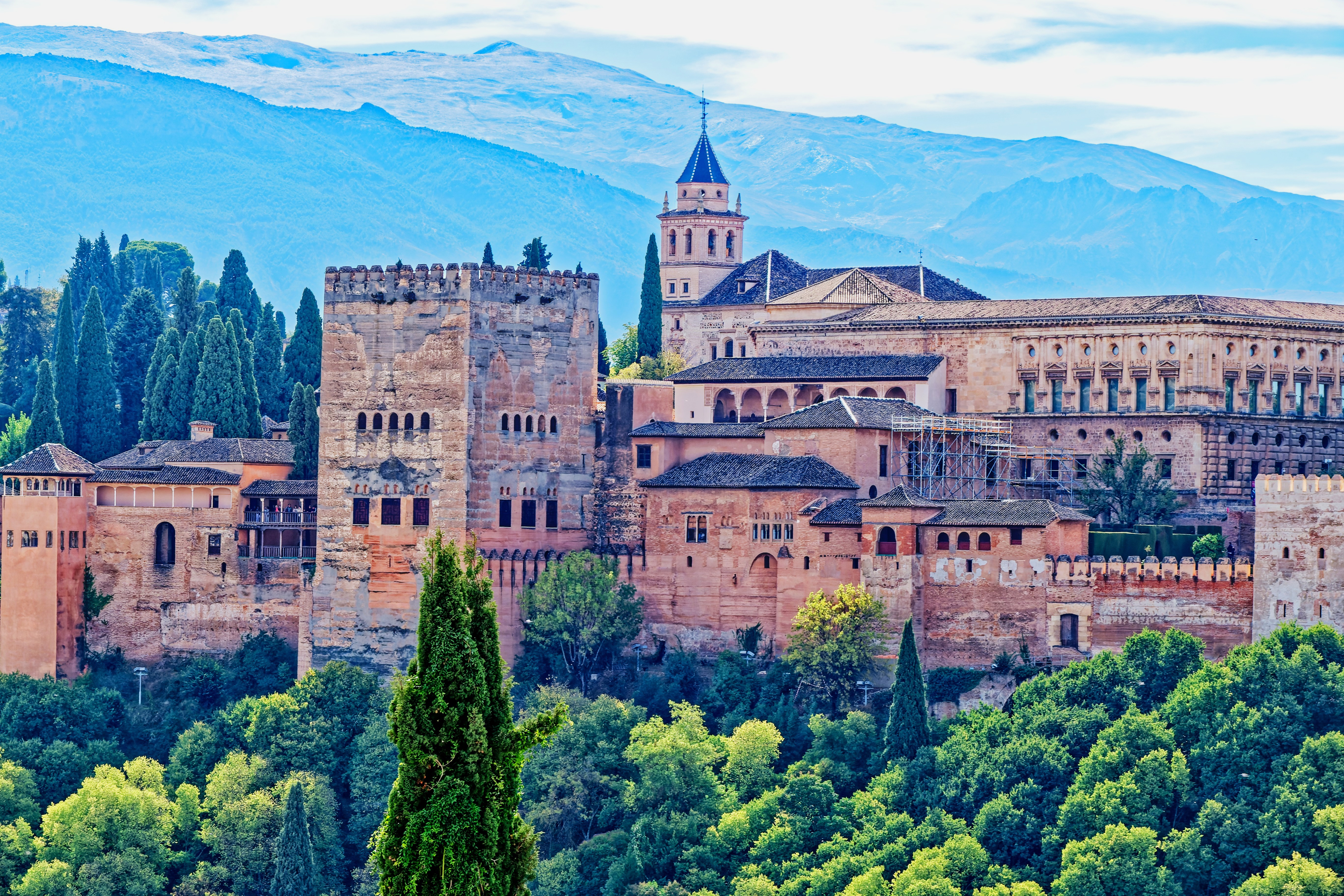
Alhambra, Granada

Spain has fifty World Heritage Sites. These include the landscape of Monte Perdido in the Pyrenees, which is shared with France, the Prehistoric Rock Art Sites of the Côa Valley and Siega Verde, which is shared with Portugal, the Heritage of Mercury, shared with Slovenia and the Ancient and Primeval Beech Forests, shared with other countries of Europe. In addition, Spain also has fourteen items of intangible cultural heritage, or "Human treasures".

=== Philosophy ===
The construct pertaining a distinctive Spanish philosophical thought has been variously approached by academia, either by diachronically tracing its development throughout the centuries from the Roman conquest of Hispania on (with early representatives such as Seneca, Trajan, Lucan, or Martial); by pinpointing its origins to the late 19th century (associated to the Generation of 98); or simply by outright denying its existence. The crux around the existence of a Spanish philosophy pitted the likes of Marcelino Menéndez y Pelayo (chief architect of the myth around it) against the legacy of anti-Spanish critique tracing back to figures like Antonio Pérez. Foreign imports such as Krausism proved to be extremely influential in Spain in the 19th and early 20th centuries.

=== Literature ===
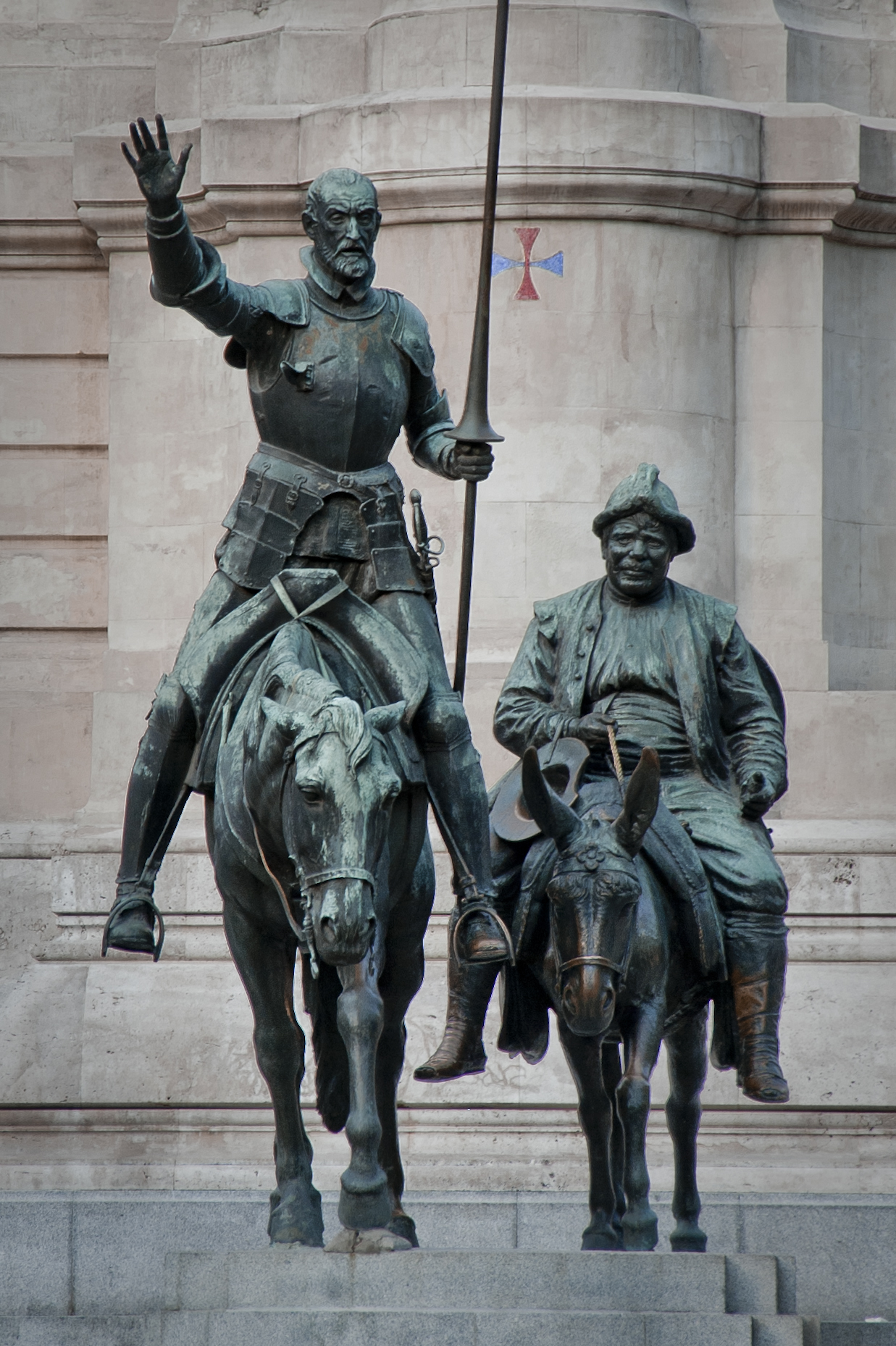
Bronze statues of Don Quixote and Sancho Panza, at the Plaza de España in Madrid

Some early examples of vernacular Romance-based literature include short snippets of Mozarabic Romance (such as refrains) sprinkled in Arabic and Hebrew texts. Other examples of early Iberian Romance include the Glosas Emilianenses written in Latin, Basque and Romance.

Early Medieval literature in Christian Iberia was written in Latin, which remained as the standard literary language up until the mid-13th century, whereas Ibero-Romance vernaculars and Basque were spoken. A decisive development ensued in the 13th century in Toledo, where Arabic scholarship was translated to the local vernacular, Castilian. In the scope of lyric poetry Castilian co-existed alongside Galician-Portuguese across the Crown of Castile up until the 16th century. The Romance variety preferred in Eastern Iberia for lyrical poetry, Occitan, became increasingly Catalanised in the 14th and 15th centuries. Major literary works from the Middle Ages include the Cantar de Mio Cid, Tirant lo Blanch, The Book of Good Love and Coplas por la muerte de su padre. Genres such as Mester de Juglaría and Mester de Clerecía were cultivated.

Promoted by the monarchs in the late Middle Ages and even codified in the late 15th century, Castilian (thought to be widespread known as 'Spanish' from the 16th century on) progressively became the language of the elites in the Iberian Peninsula, which ushered in a Golden era of Castilian literature in the 16th and 17th centuries, also in the science domain, eclipsing Galician and Catalan. Famous Early Modern works include La Celestina and Lazarillo de Tormes. The famous Don Quijote de La Mancha by Miguel de Cervantes was written at this time. Other writers from the period are: Francisco de Quevedo, Lope de Vega, Calderón de la Barca or Tirso de Molina. During the Enlightenment authors included Benito Jerónimo Feijóo, Gaspar Melchor de Jovellanos, and Leandro Fernández de Moratín.

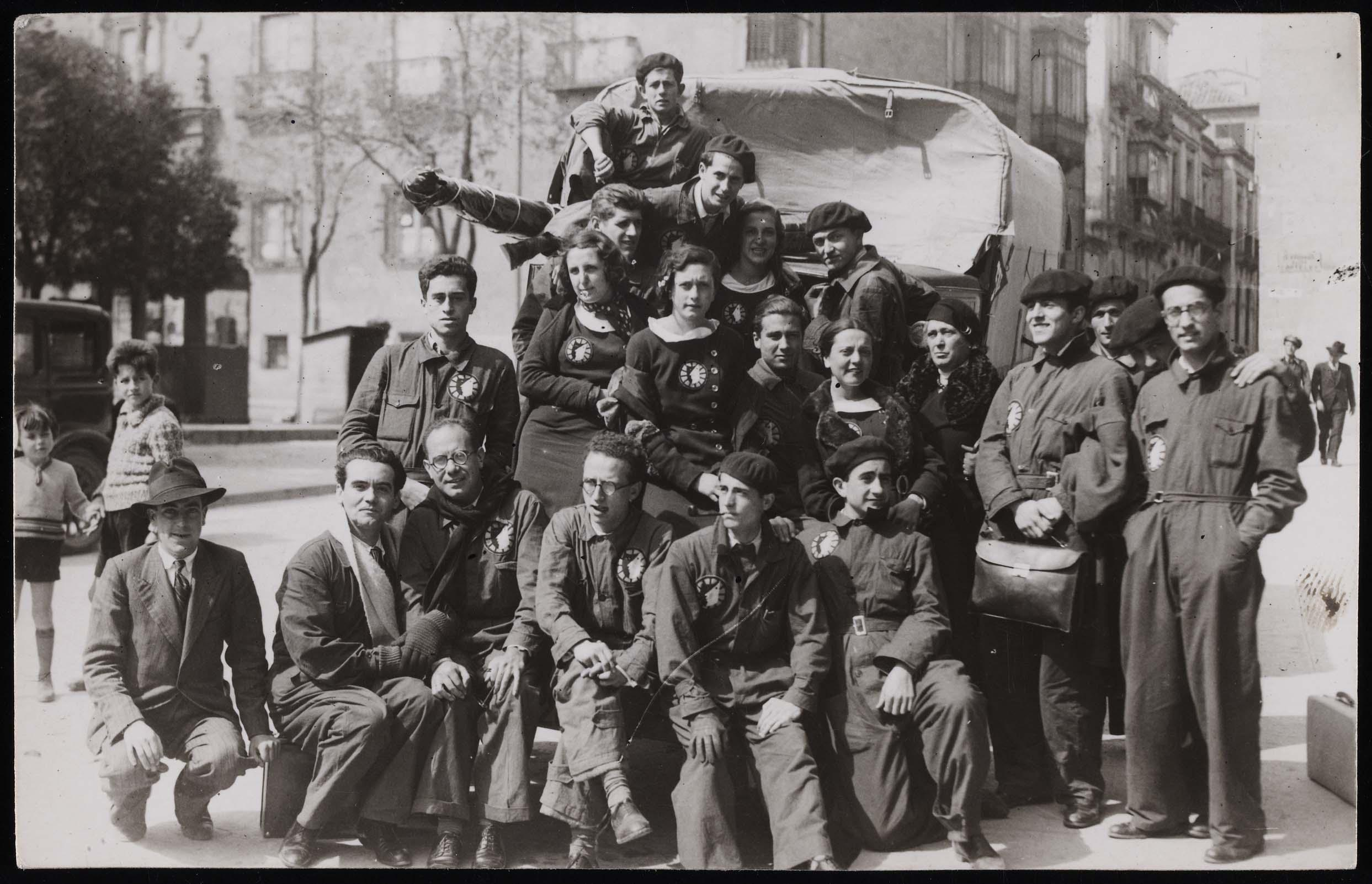
Federico García Lorca and other members of theatrical troupe "La Barraca"

Steps of Spanish Romantic literature (initially a rebellion against French classicism) have been traced back to the last quarter of the 18th century, even if the movement had its heyday between 1835 and 1850, waning thereafter. In a broader definition encompassing the period from 1868 or 1874 to 1936, the so-called Silver Age of Spanish Culture ensued.

The waning of Romantic literature was followed by the development of Spanish Realism, which offered depictions of contemporary life and society 'as they were', rather than romanticised or stylised presentations. The major realist writer was Benito Pérez Galdós. The second half of the 19th century also saw the resurgence of the literary use of local languages other than Spanish under cultural movements inspired by Romanticism such as the Catalan Renaixença or the Galician Rexurdimento. Rarely used before in a written medium, the true fostering of the literary use of the Basque language had to wait until the 1960s, even if some interest towards the language had developed in the late 19th century. 20th-century authors were classified in loose literary generations such as the Generation of '98, the Generation of '27, Generation of '36 and the Generation of '50.

Premio Planeta de Novela and Miguel de Cervantes Prize are the two main awards in Spanish literature.

=== Art ===
Les Demoiselles d'Avignon (1907), Pablo Picasso

Artists from Spain have been highly influential in the development of various European and American artistic movements. Due to historical, geographical and generational diversity, Spanish art has known a great number of influences. The Mediterranean heritage with Greco-Roman and some Moorish influences in Spain, especially in Andalusia, is still evident today. European influences include Italy, Germany and France, especially during the Renaissance, Spanish Baroque and Neoclassical periods. There are many other autochthonous styles such as the Pre-Romanesque art and architecture, Herrerian architecture or the Isabelline Gothic.

During the Golden Age painters working in Spain included El Greco, José de Ribera, Bartolomé Esteban Murillo and Francisco Zurbarán. Also, in the Baroque period, Diego Velázquez created some of the most famous Spanish portraits, such as Las Meninas and Las Hilanderas.

Francisco Goya painted during a historical period that included the Spanish Independence War, the fights between liberals and absolutists, and the rise of contemporary nation-states.

Joaquín Sorolla is a well-known modern Impressionist painter. There are many important Spanish painters belonging to the Modernist art movement, including Pablo Picasso, Salvador Dalí, Juan Gris and Joan Miró.

=== Sculpture ===
The Plateresque style extended from beginnings of the 16th century until the last third of the century and its stylistic influence pervaded the works of all great Spanish artists of the time. Alonso Berruguete (Valladolid School) is called the "Prince of Spanish sculpture". His main works were the upper stalls of the choir of the Cathedral of Toledo, the tomb of Cardinal Tavera in the same Cathedral, and the altarpiece of the Visitation in the church of Santa Úrsula in the same locality. Other notable sculptors were Bartolomé Ordóñez, Diego de Siloé, Juan de Juni and Damián Forment.

There were two Schools: the Seville School, to which Juan Martínez Montañés belonged, whose most celebrated works are the Crucifix in the Cathedral of Seville, another in Vergara, and a Saint John; and the Granada School, to which Alonso Cano belonged, to whom an Immaculate Conception and a Virgin of Rosary are attributed.

Other notable Andalusian Baroque sculptors were Pedro de Mena, Pedro Roldán and his daughter Luisa Roldán, Juan de Mesa and Pedro Duque Cornejo. In the 20th century the most important Spanish sculptors were Julio González, Pablo Gargallo, Eduardo Chillida, and Pablo Serrano.

=== Architecture ===
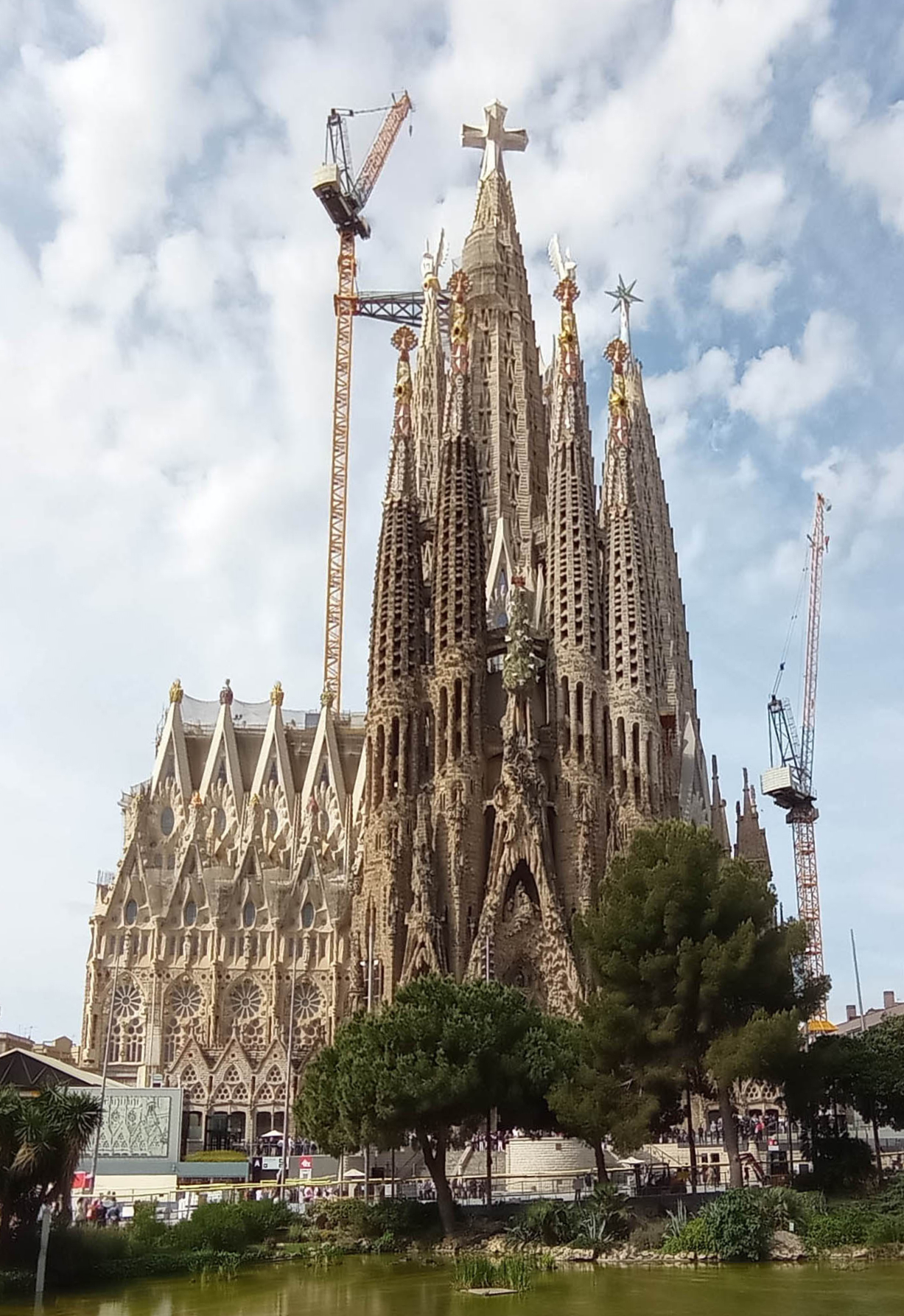
Basilica Sagrada Família in Barcelona

Earth and gypsum are very common materials of the traditional vernacular architecture in Spain (particularly in the East of the country, where most of the deposits of gypsum are located). Due to its historical and geographical diversity, Spanish architecture has drawn from a host of influences. Fine examples of Islamicate architecture, belonging to the Western Islamic tradition, were built in the Middle Ages in places such as Córdoba, Seville, or Granada. Similarly to the Maghreb, stucco decoration in Al-Andalus became an architectural stylemark in the high Middle Ages.

Simultaneously, the Christian kingdoms also developed their own styles; developing a pre-Romanesque style when isolated from contemporary mainstream European architectural influences during the earlier Middle Ages, they later integrated the Romanesque and Gothic streams. The Gothic style resulted in numerous instances of Gothic architecture being built throughout the entire territory. The so-called Mudéjar style came to designate works by Muslims, Christians and Jews in lands conquered from Muslims.

The arrival of Modernism produced much of the architecture of the 20th century. An influential style centred in Barcelona, known as modernisme, produced a number of important architects, most notably Antoni Gaudí. The International style was led by groups like GATEPAC. Spain is currently experiencing a revolution in contemporary architecture and Spanish architects like Rafael Moneo, Santiago Calatrava, and Ricardo Bofill (as well as others) have gained worldwide renown.

=== Cinema ===
After the first projection of a cinematographer in Spain by 1896, cinema developed in the following years, with Barcelona becoming the largest production hub in the country (as well as a major European hub) on the eve of the World War I. The conflict offered the Spanish industry of silent films an opportunity for further growth. Local studios for sound films were created in 1932. The government imposition of dubbing of foreign films in 1941 accustomed Spanish audiences to watching dubbed films.

Spanish cinema has achieved major international success including Oscars for films such as Pan's Labyrinth and Volver. Distinct exploitation genres that flourished in the second half of the 20th century include the Fantaterror, the cine quinqui and the so-called Cine de destape films. As of 2021, the festivals of San Sebastián and Málaga are ranked among the top cultural initiatives in the country.

=== Music and dance ===
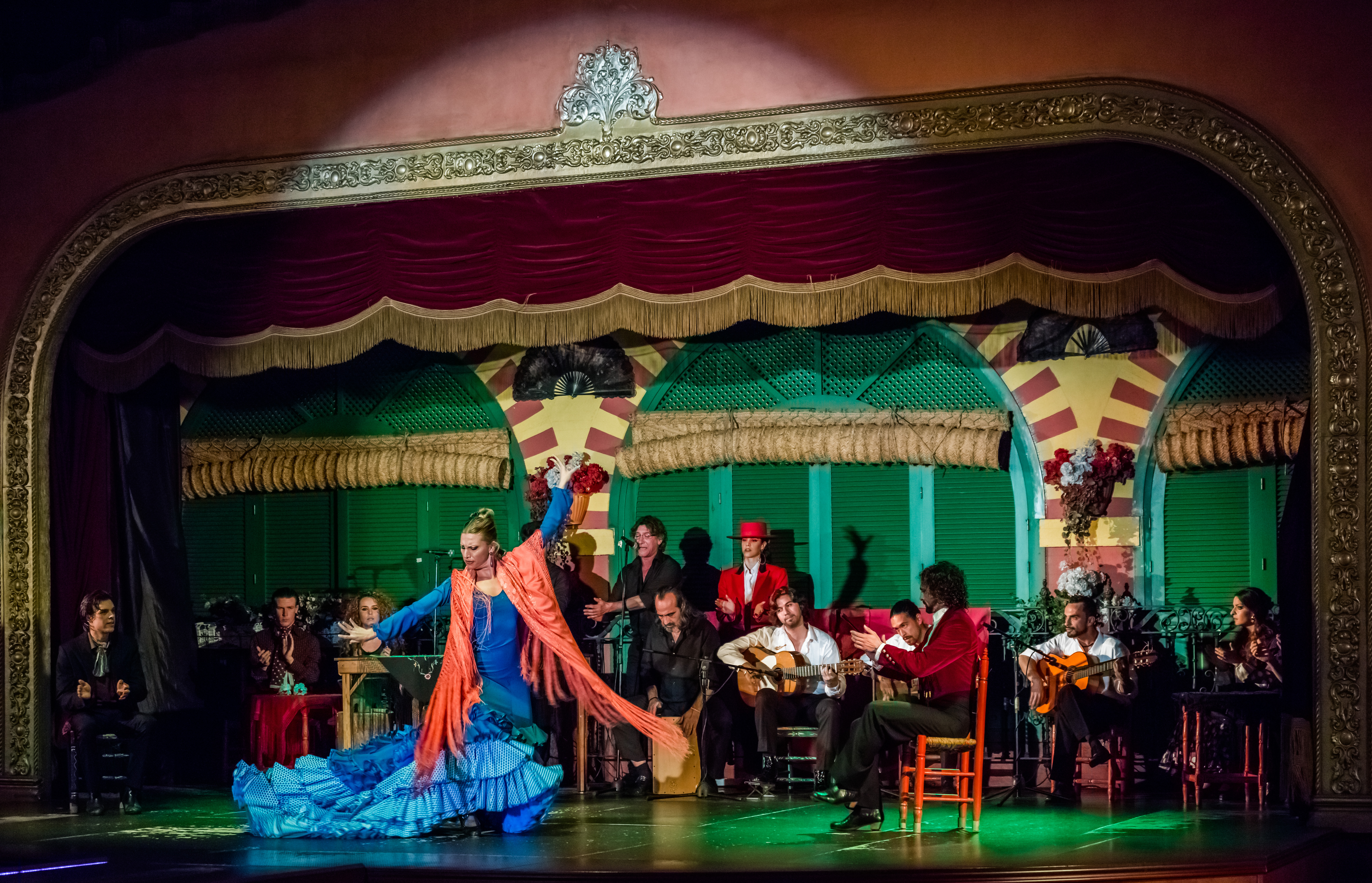
Flamenco is an Andalusian artistic form that evolved from Seguidilla.

Spanish music is often considered abroad to be synonymous with flamenco, a West Andalusian musical genre, which is not widespread outside that region. Various regional styles of folk music abound. Pop, rock, hip hop and heavy metal are also popular.

In the field of classical music, Spain has produced a number of noted composers such as Isaac Albéniz, Manuel de Falla and Enrique Granados and singers and performers such as Plácido Domingo, José Carreras, Montserrat Caballé, Alicia de Larrocha, Alfredo Kraus, Pablo Casals, Ricardo Viñes, José Iturbi, Pablo de Sarasate, Jordi Savall and Teresa Berganza. In Spain there are over forty professional orchestras, including the Orquestra Simfònica de Barcelona, Orquesta Nacional de España and the Orquesta Sinfónica de Madrid. Major opera houses include the Teatro Real, the Gran Teatre del Liceu, Teatro Arriaga and the El Palau de les Arts Reina Sofía.

Thousands of music fans also travel to Spain each year for internationally recognised summer music festivals Sónar which features pop and techno acts, and Benicàssim which tends to feature alternative rock and dance acts. The Vitoria-Gasteiz jazz festival is a notable jazz festival. One of the most popular traditional musical instruments, the guitar, originated in Spain. Typical of the north are the traditional bag pipers or gaiteros, mainly in Asturias and Galicia.

=== Cuisine ===
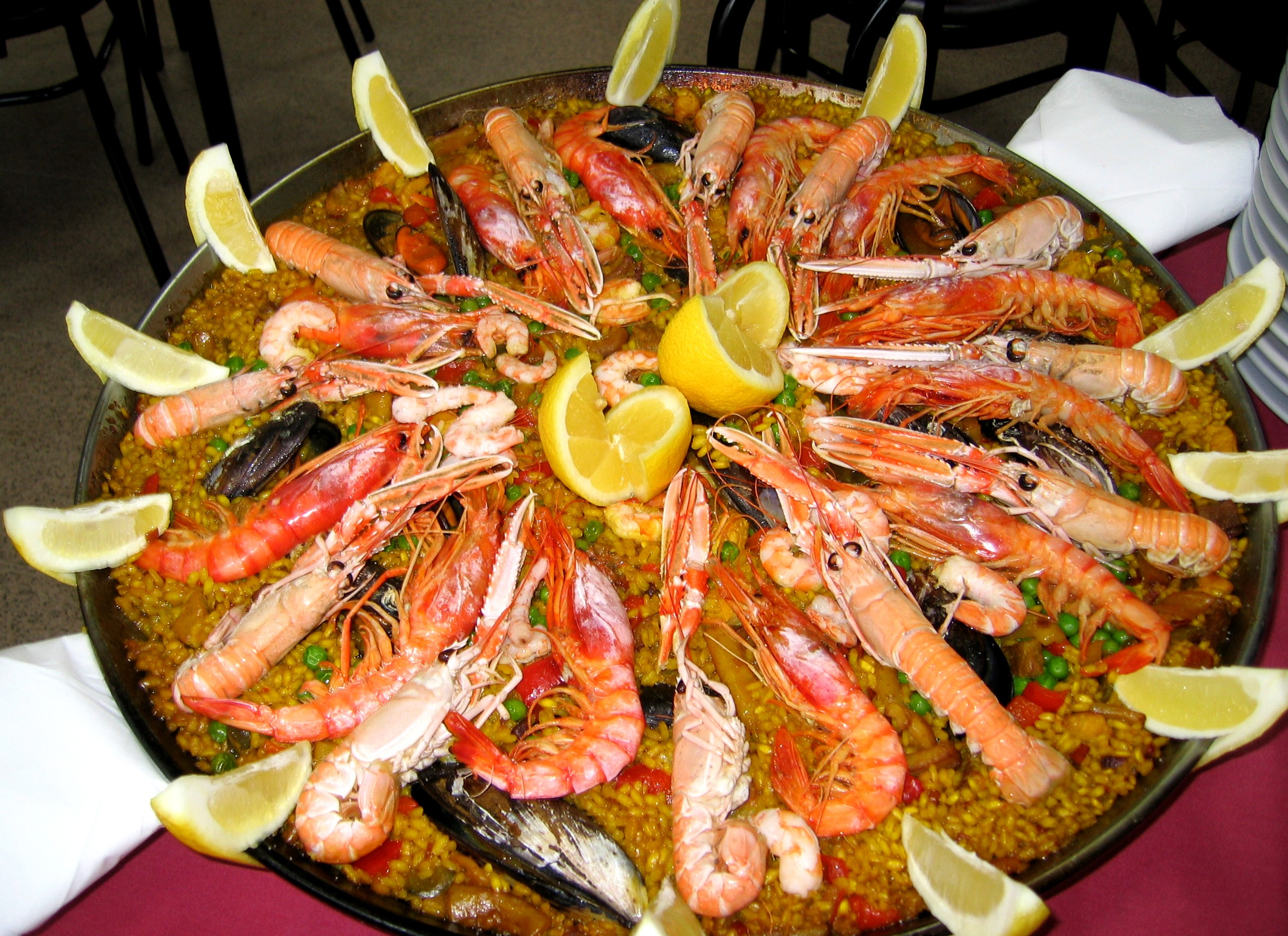
Paella mixta

Spanish cuisine consists of a great variety of dishes which stem from differences in geography, culture and climate. It is heavily influenced by seafood available from the waters that surround the country, and reflects the country's deep Mediterranean roots. Spain's extensive history with many cultural influences has led to a unique cuisine. In particular, three main divisions are easily identified:

Mediterranean Spain – coastal regions, from Catalonia to Andalusia – heavy use of seafood, such as pescaíto frito (fried fish); cold soups like gazpacho; and many rice-based dishes like paella from Valencia and arròs negre (black rice) from Catalonia.

Inner Spain – Castile – hot, thick soups such as the bread and garlic-based Castilian soup, along with substantial stews such as cocido madrileño. Food is traditionally preserved by salting, such as Spanish ham, or immersed in olive oil, such as Manchego cheese.

Atlantic Spain – the Northern coast, including Asturian, Basque, Cantabrian and Galician cuisine – vegetable and fish-based stews like caldo gallego and marmitako. Also, the lightly cured lacón ham. The best known cuisine of the northern countries often rely on ocean seafood, as in the Basque-style cod, albacore or anchovy or the Galician octopus-based polbo á feira and shellfish dishes.

=== Sport ===
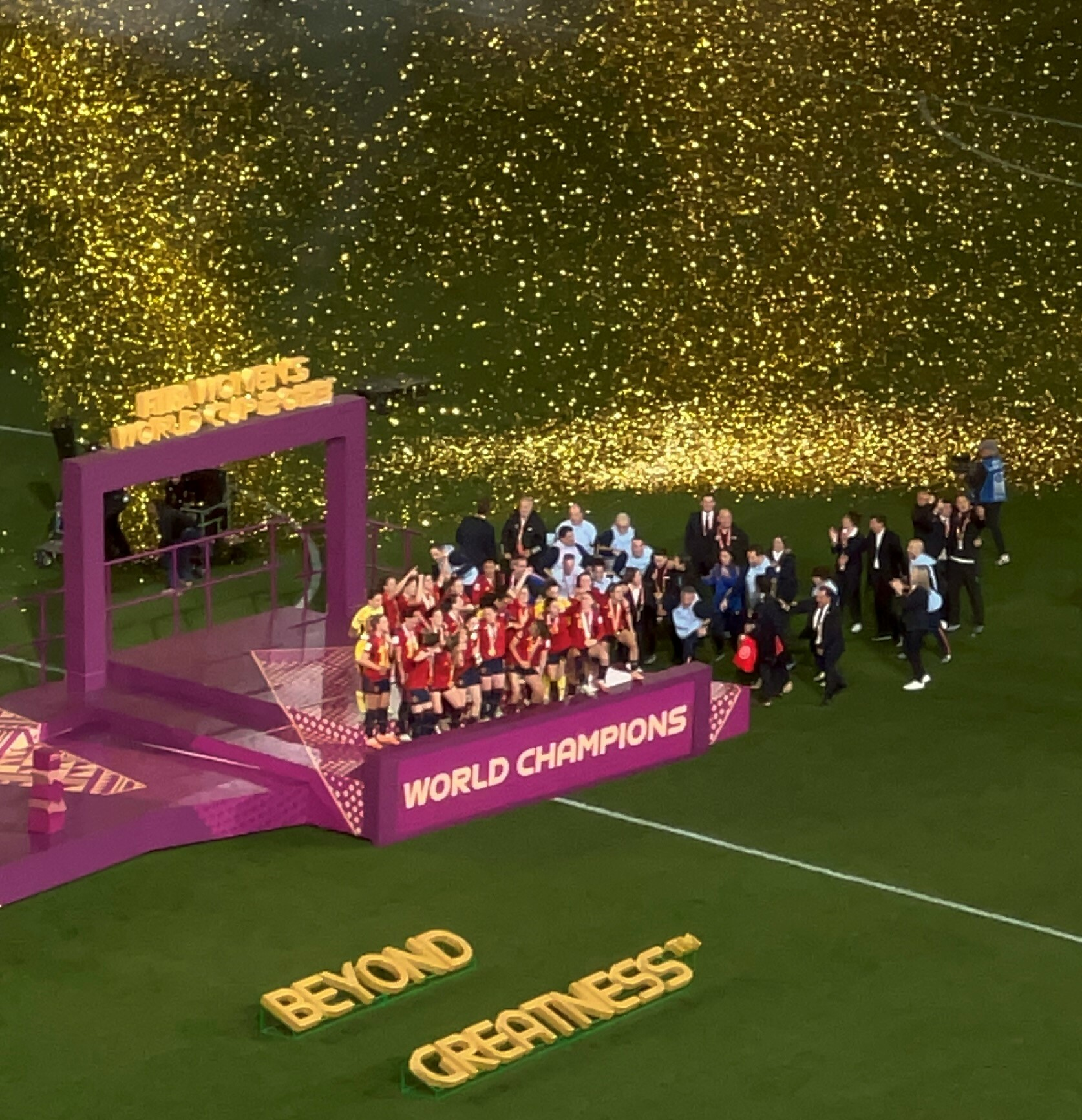
Spain or La Roja celebrating their 2023 FIFA Women's World Cup victory

While varieties of football have been played in Spain as far back as Roman times, sport in Spain has been dominated by football since the early 20th century. Real Madrid CF and FC Barcelona are two of the most successful football clubs in the world. The country's national men's football team won the UEFA European Championship in 1964, 2008, 2012 and 2024 and the FIFA World Cup in 2010 and 2026, and is the first team ever to win three back-to-back major international tournaments. Spain's women's national team were champions of the 2023 FIFA Women's World Cup, becoming one of only five nations to win the Women's World Cup. Barcelona Femení has won a record number of domestic trophies.

Spain celebrating their 2026 FIFA World Cup victory, achieving their 2nd title since 2010.

Basketball, tennis—where players like Rafa Nadal and Carlos Alcaraz stand out—cycling, handball, futsal, motorcycling and, lately, Formula One also can boast of Spanish champions. Today, Spain is a major world sports powerhouse, especially since the 1992 Summer Olympics and Paralympics that were hosted in Barcelona, which stimulated a great deal of interest in sports in the country. The tourism industry has led to an improvement in sports infrastructure, especially for water sports, golf and skiing. In their respective regions, the traditional games of Basque pelota and Valencian pilota are both popular.

=== Public holidays and festivals ===
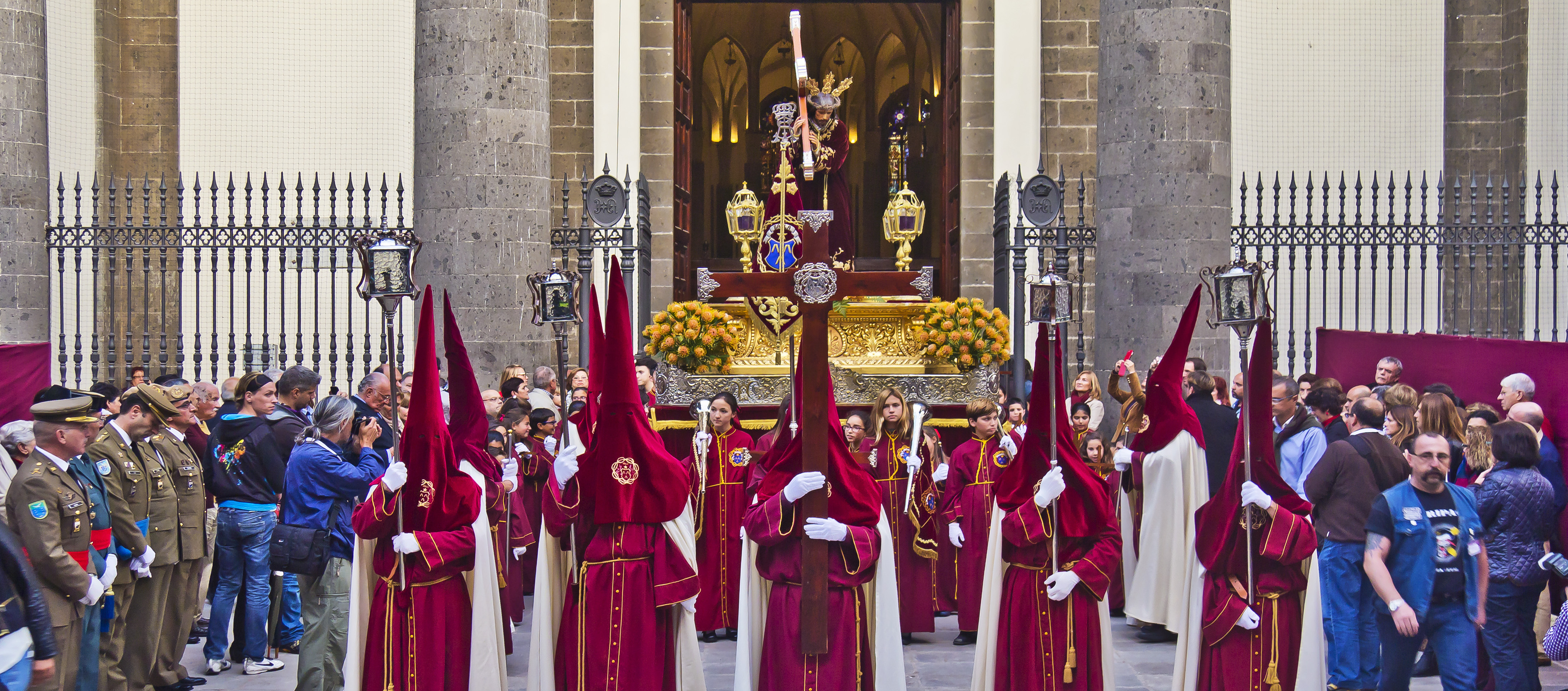
Semana Santa in La Laguna, Tenerife

Public holidays celebrated in Spain include a mix of religious (Roman Catholic), national and local observances. Each municipality is allowed to declare a maximum of fourteen public holidays per year; up to nine of these are chosen by the national government and at least two are chosen locally. Spain's National Day (Fiesta Nacional de España) is celebrated on 12 October.

There are many festivals and festivities in Spain. One of the most famous is San Fermín, in Pamplona. Its most famous event is the encierro, or the running of the bulls. It has become one of the most internationally renowned fiestas in Spain, with over a million people attending every year.

Other festivals include La Tomatina tomato festival in Buñol, Valencia, the carnivals in the Canary Islands, the Falles in Valencia or the Holy Week in Andalusia and Castile and León.

=== Media ===
In Spain, TV is the main source of news and satellite and cable are popular digital platforms. Home-produced dramas, reality shows and long-running soap operas are staple fare on primetime TV. Regional TV networks are operated by their respective governments and there are many local stations. The biggest TV provider is Movistar+, owned by telecom firm Telefónica.

On 11 March 2026, Spanish Prime Minister Pedro Sanchez announced that he will launch HODIO, a tool which will allow the government to systematically track the presence, amplification and impact of hate speech online, to measure hate speech on digital platforms as part of a broader strategy to increase oversight of social media companies.

== See also ==
- Borders of Spain
- Crime in Spain
- Outline of Spain
