= Occitano-Romance languages =

Branch of the Romance language group

Occitano-Romance
- Geographic distribution: France, Spain, Andorra, Monaco, Italy
- Ethnicity: Catalans, Valencians, Occitans
- Linguistic classification: Indo-European: Italic; Latino-Faliscan; Latin; Romance; Italo-Western; Western Romance; Gallo-Iberian?; (disputed); Occitano-Romance
- Early forms: Old Latin: Vulgar Latin; Proto-Romance; Old Occitan
- Subdivisions: Catalan; Occitan; Aragonese?

Language codes
- Glottolog: None
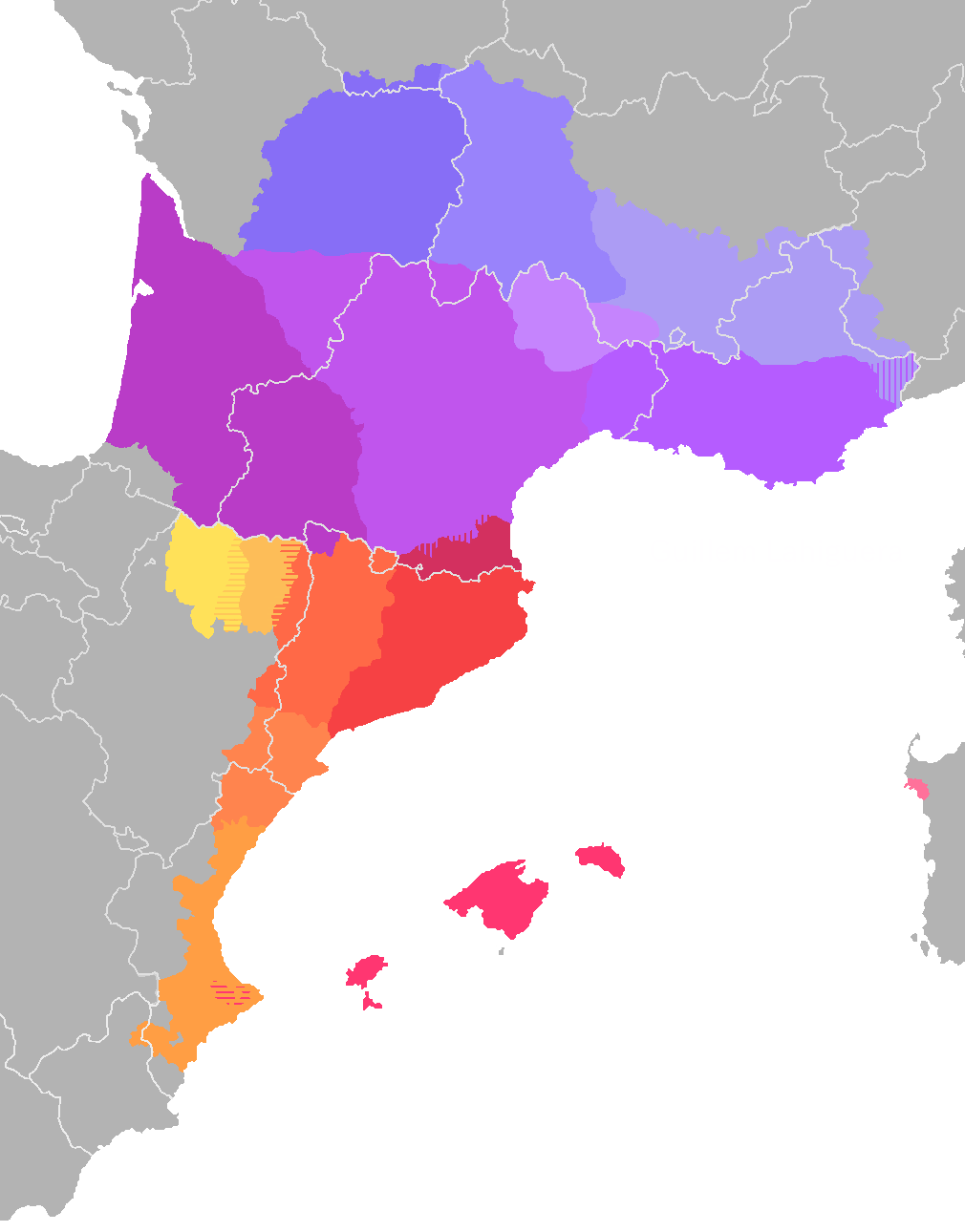
- Occitan in shades of Purple, Catalan in shades of Red and Aragonese in shades of Yellow

Occitano-Romance (Catalan: llengües occitanoromàniques; Occitan: leng(u)as occitanoromanicas; Aragonese: luengas occitanoromanicas) is a branch of the Romance language group that encompasses, in the narrowest sense, the Catalan/Valencian and Occitan languages spoken in parts of southern France and eastern Spain, with Aragonese also occasionally included.

The classification of Occitano-Romance languages within the wider Romance language family has been a subject of a long-standing debate due to its transitional nature in the Western Romance dialect continuum.

The Gardiol language has been classified by Glottolog as an independent language in the Occitanic language family, but has also been classified as a dialect of Occitan.

== Extent ==
The group covers the languages of the southern part of France (Occitania including Northern Catalonia), eastern Spain (Catalonia, Valencian Community, Balearic Islands, La Franja, Carche, Northern Aragon), together with Andorra, Monaco, parts of Italy (Occitan Valleys, Alghero, Guardia Piemontese), and historically in the County of Tripoli and the possessions of the Crown of Aragon. The existence of this group of languages is discussed on both linguistic and political bases.

== Classification of Catalan ==
The classification of Occitano-Romance languages has been debated since the middle of the 19th century. According to some linguists, both Occitan and Catalan/Valencian should be considered genealogically Gallo-Romance languages. Other linguists concur in regards to Occitan but consider Catalan and Aragonese to be part of the Ibero-Romance languages. The matter is complicated by the group's transitional nature and qualities within the Western Romance dialect continuum; Occitano-Romance languages maintain a level of mutual intelligibility as well as shared characteristics with both neighboring Gallo-Romance and Ibero-Romance. They have also historically been heavily influenced by and borrowed from both of those language groups which further obscures clear classification.

The issue is as political as it is linguistic as the division into Gallo-Romance languages and Ibero-Romance languages was contemporaneous with nation-building of the current nation states of France and Spain and so is based more on territorial criteria than historic and linguistic criteria. In the early 21st century, Occitan and Catalan, the group's two major representatives, are generally spoken regionally alongside the dominant state languages, namely French and Spanish. One of the main proponents of the unity of the languages of the Iberian Peninsula was Spanish philologist Ramón Menéndez Pidal, and for a long time, others such as Swiss linguist Wilhelm Meyer-Lübke (Das Katalanische, Heidelberg, 1925) have supported the kinship of Occitan and Catalan. Also, due to Aragonese not having been studied as much as both Catalan and Occitan, many people still label it as a Spanish dialect.

From the 8th century to the 13th century, there was no clear sociolinguistic distinction between Occitania and Catalonia. For instance, the Provençal troubadour, Albertet de Sestaró, says: "Monks, tell me which according to your knowledge are better: the French or the Catalans? And here I shall put Gascony, Provence, Limousin, Auvergne and Viennois while there shall be the land of the two kings." In Marseille, a typical Provençal song is called 'Catalan song'.

== Classification of Aragonese ==
Aragonese is a language which has not been studied as much as Catalan and Occitan. On many occasions throughout history, people have disregarded it and labeled it as a Spanish dialect, mainly because of extralinguistic reasons such as its small extension and the fact that it's spoken in rural areas.

The language has been minoritized for centuries and labelled as either a broken dialect or as a second class language. Spanish became the language of prestige right away after the union of Aragon with Castile and the use of Aragonese started to decline. Even though it had been used by the government and administration for many years, it rapidly became a language that was used informally and looked down upon.

Territorial decline of the Aragonese language in favour of Spanish

This situation of diglossia meant the beginning of a period (that still lasts) of a strong Spanish influence. Many Spanish loanwords entered Aragonese and its evolution from that moment on was tied to Spanish. Some grammatical features documented in medieval Aragonese were lost, such as the usage of the Latin ending -ŪTUM for the creation of the participle verb forms such as in perduto (lost) instead of -ĪTUM that ended up being perdito, which later became perdiu in many dialects due to Spanish influence as well. Many of the loanwords that entered Aragonese were names of new concepts, but many others were basic words of the everyday life such as numbers or the days of the week. Aragonese morphology could have been affected as well. One example of the morphological influence of Spanish is the treatment of the terminal Latin vowels -Ĕ, -Ŭ (later -e, -o). Aragonese tends to lose the final unstressed -e that Spanish preserves (compare the word for milk in Aragonese leit and in Spanish leche), while the final -o is maintained more depending on the dialect and the degree of Spanish influence. Some dialects, such as Belsetan, a central dialect, tend to have the apocope of -o when the word ends with -n, -r and -l, such as in camín (path), rar (rare) and pel (hair). However, this apocope of -o but also the apocope of -e have been receding in territory and usage, and the final vowels have been reintroduced in many dialects.

On the other hand, the recent studies have allowed us to get a better insight into the core of the Aragonese language. Despite the previously mentioned influence, there are still many features that bring Aragonese closer to both Occitan and Catalan. The lexicon of everyday life is harder to change after being influenced by other languages. The lexicon of plants, animals and the rural life poses a great example of this:

English	Occitan	Catalan	Aragonese	Spanish
oat	civada	civada	cibada ~ cebada	avena
barley	òrdi	ordi	hordio	cebada
acorn	aglan	glà	glan	bellota
rosehip	gratacuol	gavarrera ~ gavarró	garrabera ~ gabardera	escaramujo
pomegranate	milgrana	magrana ~ mangrana	minglana ~ mengrana	granada
fern	falguièra ~ feuse	falguera	feleguera ~ felce	helecho
squirrel	esquiròl	esquirol	esquirol ~ esquiruelo	ardilla

Another example would be the use of the verb "to be". Aragonese and Occitan use one verb for what Catalan and the Ibero-Romance languages use two:

1. Occitan: èsser (depending on the dialect they can use other forms such as èstre, estar and èster)
  Èster vielha. (to be old, in Aranese Occitan)
2. Aragonese: estar
  Estar viella (to be old)
3. Catalan, just as in Spanish: ser (o ésser) and estar:
  Ser vella (to be old. In this case ser and estar can't be used indistinctly without altering the meaning)

The conjugation of the Aragonese and Occitan forms comes close to the conjugation of ser in Catalan, and this sets the three languages apart from the Ibero-Romance languages with the kind of uses that the verb "to be" has. For example with the sentence "We are here" we can see the difference in use of the verb "to be" when used to talk about a location:

1. Occitan: sem aicí !
2. Aragonese: som aquí!
3. Catalan: som aquí!
4. Spanish: estamos aquí!

=== The Ribagorçan dialect ===
Romance languages form what is called a dialect continuum. Each language within this continuum tends to be linked to another via a dialect that shares many traits with the other language. Usually these dialects are far enough from the standard forms of the two languages they link, and sometimes they can be difficult to classify as a dialect of language X or language Y. Between Aragonese and Catalan there is a linguistic variety called Ribagorçan. This constitutive dialect makes a clean transition between Aragonese and Catalan. Some linguists consider that it belongs to the Aragonese language, some others that it belongs to the Catalan language and some others that it constitutes a micro-language on its own. Nowadays, most of the dialect is considered to be Aragonese and it is recognized as such by the regional governments. The matter is that the Ribagorçan variety has more characteristics that take it closer to Catalan than other Aragonese dialects. Therefore some of the people that argue that Ribagorçan is Catalan, could argue that it should be classified alongside Catalan.

It's important to note that, unlike between Aragonese and Catalan, there isn't a constitutive dialect between Aragonese and Spanish. During the Middle Ages, there were two linguistic varieties (Riojan and Navarrese respectively) between Old Spanish and Medieval High Aragonese. However these two varieties were replaced by Spanish and the dialect continuum was broken between the Ibero-Romance languages and Aragonese plus the other Romance languages.

== Internal variation ==
Most linguists separate Catalan and Occitan, but both languages have been treated as one in studies by Occitan linguists attempting to classify the dialects of Occitan in supradialectal groups, as is the case of Pierre Bec and, more recently, of Domergue Sumien.

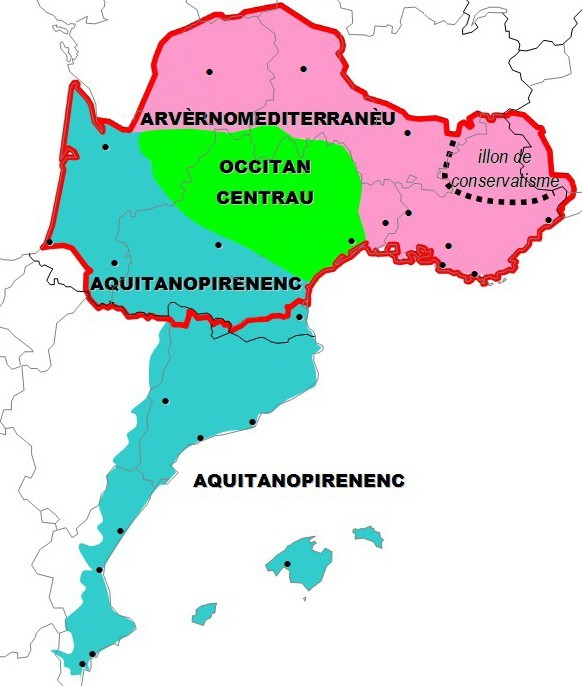
Supradialectal classification of Occitano-Romance according to P. Bec

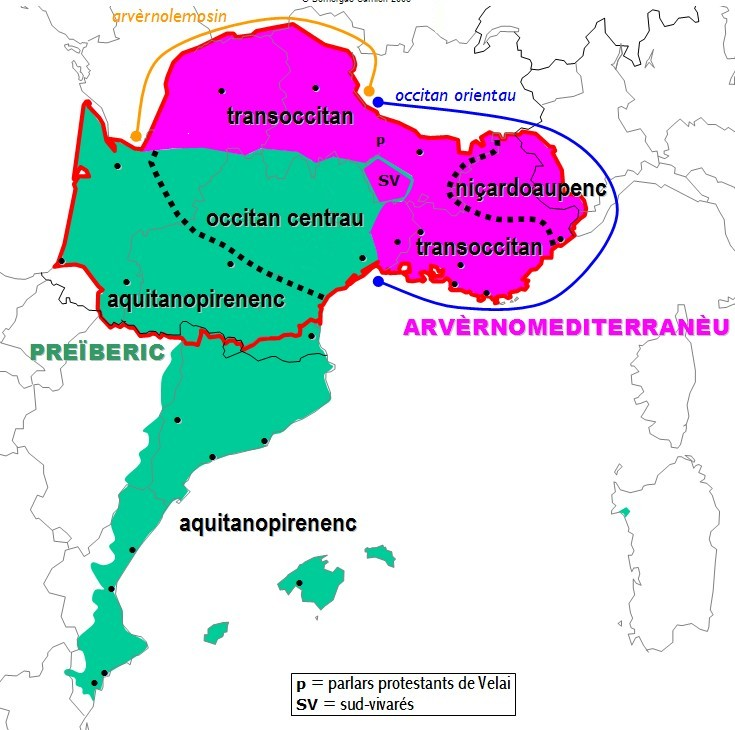
Supradialectal classification of Occitano-Romance according to D. Sumien

Both join together in an Aquitano-Pyrenean or Pre-Iberian group including Catalan, Gascon and a part of Lengadocian, leaving the rest of Occitan in one (Sumien: Arverno-Mediterranean) or two groups (Bec: Arverno-Mediterranean, Central Occitan).

The answer to the question of whether Gascon or Catalan should be considered dialects of Occitan or separate languages has long been a matter of opinion or convention, rather than based on scientific grounds. However, two recent studies support Gascon's being considered a distinct language. For the very first time, a quantifiable, statistics-based approach was applied by Stephan Koppelberg in an attempt to solve this issue. Based on the results he obtained, he concludes that Catalan, Occitan, and Gascon should all be considered three distinct languages. More recently, Y. Greub and J.P. Chambon (Sorbonne University, Paris) demonstrated that the formation of Proto-Gascon was already complete on the eve of the 7th century, whereas Proto-Occitan was not yet formed at that time. These results induced linguists to do away with the conventional classification of Gascon, favoring the "distinct language" alternative. Both studies supported the early intuition of late Kurt Baldinger, a specialist of both medieval Occitan and medieval Gascon, who recommended that Occitan and Gascon be classified as separate languages.

== Linguistic variation ==
=== Similarities between Catalan, Occitan and Aragonese ===
- Both Catalan and Occitan have apocope on terminal Latin vowels -Ĕ, -Ŭ (later -e, -o). Aragonese however has apocope of -Ĕ and in some cases, depending on the dialect, of -Ŭ:
  Latin		Catalan		Occitan		Aragonese		Spanish
  Orthography	IPA	Orthography	IPA	Orthography	IPA	Orthography	IPA	Spanish
  TRÚNCU(M)	[ˈtrʊŋkũː]	tronc	[tɾoŋ(k)]	tronc	[tɾuŋ(k)]	tronco	[ˈtɾoŋko]	tronco
  MANUS	[ˈmanʊs]	mà	[ma]	man	[ma]	man	[man]	mano
  This evolution does not occur when the ellision of -e or -o results in a terminal consonant cluster.
  Latin	Old Occitan	Catalan	Occitan	Aragonese
  ÁRBORE(M)	ARBRE	arbre	arbre	árbol*
  QUÁTTOR	QUÁTRO	quatre	quatre	cuatre
  Due to the evolution of the word ÁRBORE(M) in Aragonese, this example doesn't show the conservation of -e or -o that prevents a terminal consonant cluster.
  However, even though it is considered a Gallo-Romance trait, it's not present in Franco-Provençal, one of the main two languages of the Gallo-Romance, generally preserves the original final vowel after a syllable-final cluster, such as quattuor "four" > quatro (compare French quatre).
- Another shared trait is the conservation of the Latin initial consonantic groups FL-/CL-/PL-:
  English	Latin	Catalan	Occitan	Aragonese
  key	CLAVIS	clau	clau	clau
  flame	FLAMMA	flama	flama	flama
  full	PLĒNUS	ple	plen	plen ~ pleno
  Some dialects of both Occitan and Aragonese palatalize these groups into FLL-/CLL-/PLL-.
- A large part of the lexicon is shared, and in general written words in Catalan, Aragonese and Occitan are mutually intelligible. Similar to the differences in lexicon between Portuguese and Spanish (although this is not always the case with spoken language and varies from dialect to dialect). There are also notable cognates between Catalan, Occitan and Aragonese.
  English	Latin	Catalan	Occitan	Aragonese
  old	VÉCLA(M)	vella	vièlha	viella
  night	NOCTEM	nit	nuèit ~ nuèch	nueit ~ nit
  to rise	PODIŌ	pujar	pujar	puyar
  to eat	MANDŪCĀRE	menjar	manjar	minchar
  to take	PRĒNDŌ	prendre	préner ~ prendre	prener ~ prenre
  middle / half	MÉDIU(M)	mig	mièg	meyo
  enough	PRŌDE	prou	pro ~ pron	prou ~ pro
  I	ÉGO	jo	ieu	yo
  to follow	SÉQUERE	seguir	seguir	seguir(e)
  leaf	FÓLIA(M)	fulla	fuèlha	fuella ~ fulla
  morning	MĀTŪTĪNUS	matí	matin	maitín

=== Differences between Catalan, Occitan and Aragonese ===
Most of the differences of the vowel system stem from neutralizations that take place on unstressed syllables. In both languages a stressed syllable has a great number of possible different vowels, while phonologically different vowels end up being articulated in the same way in an unstressed syllable. Although this neutralization is common to both languages, the details differ markedly. In Occitan the form of neutralization depends on whether a vowel is pretonic (before the stressed syllable) or posttonic (after the stressed syllable). For example /ɔ/ articulates as [u] in pretonic position and as [o] in posttonic position, and only as [ɔ] in stressed position. In contrast, neutralization in Catalan is the same regardless of the position of the unstressed syllable (although it differs from dialect to dialect). Many of these changes happened in the 14th or late 13th century.

Slightly older are the palatalizations present in Occitan before a palatal or velar consonant:

Occitan	Catalan	English
vièlha	vella	Old
mièg	mig	Middle/Half
ieu	jo	I
seguir	seguir	To follow
fuèlha	fulla	Leaf

The diphthongs and also set all these three languages apart, having each language different patterns and systems. Most of these come from the diphthongisation of Latin words with monophthongs, such as the descendants of the words like FĒSTA (party) or OCULUS (eye), or the monophthongization of Latin words that already had a diphthong, like CAUSA (thing). Some examples:

English	Catalan	Occitan	Aragonese
eye	ull	uèlh	uello
leaf	fulla	fuèlha	fuella
bridge	pont	pont	puent
party	festa	fèsta	fiesta
thing	cosa	causa	cosa
few, little	poc	pauc	poco

=== Shared traits between Catalan and Aragonese but not Occitan ===
A noticeable difference heard by speakers of Catalan and Aragonese is the use of rounded vowels in Occitan. Both Catalan and Aragonese lack rounded vowels. However, Occitan has /y/ and /œ/ in words like luna and fuèlha respectively.

The treatment of the Latin geminate -nn- also differs in Occitan. While Catalan and Aragonese tend to reduce the -nn- into a [ɲ], in Occitan it turned into a [n]:

English	Catalan	Aragonese	Occitan
year	any	anyo	an

On another page, while Occitan uses exclusively the simple past tense, Catalan (most dialects) and Aragonese (Eastern dialects) use another past tense called the periphrastic past. This tense is made of the sum of the conjugation of the verb to go plus the verb performing the action in infinitive form:

English	Catalan	Aragonese	Occitan
I bought	vaig comprar	va crompar ~ voi crompar	crompèri
you bought	vas comprar	vas crompar	crompères
he/she bought	va comprar	va crompar	crompèt
we bought	vam comprar	vam crompar ~ vom crompar	crompèrem
you bought	vau comprar	vaz crompar ~ voz crompar	crompèretz
they bought	van comprar	van crompar	crompèron

=== Shared traits between Catalan and Occitan but not Aragonese ===
Something that sets apart Aragonese and some Catalan dialects (such as central Valencian or Ribagorçan Catalan) from Occitan and most of the Catalan dialects is the devoicing or desonorization that happened in the former group. Phonemes such as /dʒ/ and /z/, which were replaced by /tʃ/ and /θ/.

Aragonese is the only of the three languages to have the -mbr- consonant cluster between vowels. Note that Ribagorçan tends to lose them as well:

English	Catalan	Occitan	Aragonese
hunger	fam	fam/talent	fambre
man	home	òme	hombre

=== Shared traits between Occitan and Aragonese but not Catalan ===
Catalan also has some things that sets it apart from the other two is the palatalization of the initial L. From /l/ to /ʎ/.

English	Catalan	Occitan	Aragonese
tongue	llengua	lenga	luenga ~ lengua
to read	llegir	legir	leyer

Those dialects of Aragonese that palatalize the consonant clusters mentioned before, also palatalize the initial L:

English	Catalan	Ribagorçan
Tongue	llengua	lluenga ~ llengua
to read	llegir	llechir ~ lleyer

Another trait is the use of the descendants of the pronoun EGO when used as the object of a preposition. Most Catalan dialects and the Ibero-Romance languages distinguish between the pronoun used as a subject EGO and the object of a preposition MIHĪ̆, while both Aragonese and Occitan use the descendant of EGO:

English	Catalan	Occitan	Aragonese
I	jo	ieu	yo
(with) me	amb mi	amb ieu	con yo

Moreover, Aragonese and Occitan do not have proparoxytones, words with stress on the antepenultimate (third last) syllable. However, Catalan has them. The word "music" can be an example of this:

- Occitan: [myˈzikɔ]
- Aragonese: [muˈsika]
- Catalan: [ˈmuzikə]

=== Lexical comparison ===
Variations in the spellings and pronunciations of numbers in several Occitano-Romance dialects:

Numeral	Occitan					Catalan		Aragonese	PROTO- OcRm
Numeral	Northern Occitan		Western Occitan	Eastern Occitan		Eastern Catalan	Northwestern Catalan	Aragonese	PROTO- OcRm
Numeral	Auvergnat	Limousin	Gascon	Languedocien	Provençal	Eastern Catalan	Northwestern Catalan	Aragonese	PROTO- OcRm
1	vyn / vynɐ vun / vunå	ỹ / ynɔ un / una	y / yo un / ua	yᵑ / ynɒ un / una	yŋ / yno un / una	un / unə un / una	un / una un / una	un~uno / una un~uno / una	*un / *una
2	du / dua dou / duas	du / dua dos / doas	dys / dyos dus / duas	dus / duɒs dos / doas	dus / duas dous / douas	dos / duəs dos / dues	dos/dues dos / dues	dos / duas dos / duas	*dos~dus / *duas
3	tʀei trei	trei tres	tres tres	tʁɛs tres	tʀes tres	trɛs tres	trɛs tres	tɾes tres	*tres
4	katʀə catre	katre quatre	kwatə quatre	katʁe quatre	katʀə quatre	kwatrə quatre	kwatre quatre	kwatre~kwatro quatre / quatro	*kwatre
5	ʃin sin	ʃin cinc	siŋk cinq	siŋk cinc	siŋ cinq	siŋ / siŋk cinc	siŋ / siŋk cinc	θiŋko~θiŋk cinco / cinc	*siŋk
6	ʃei siei	ʃiei sieis	ʃeis sheis	si̯ɛi̯s sièis	siei sieis	sis sis	sis sis	seis~sieis seis / sieis	*sieis
7	se sé	ʃe sèt	sɛt sèt	sɛt sèt	sɛ sèt	sɛt set	sɛt set	siet~sɛt siet / set	*sɛt
8	vø veu	jɥe uèch	weit ueit	y̯ɛt͡ʃ / y̯ɛi̯t uèch / uèit	vɥe vue	buit / vuit vuit	vuit / wit vuit / huit	weito~weit ueito / ueit	*weit
9	niø~nou nieu~nou	nɔu nòu	nau nau	nɔu̯ nòu	nu nòu	nɔu nou	nɔu nou	nweu~nɔu nueu / nou	*nɔu
10	die~de dié~dé	diɛ~de detz	dɛt͡s dètz	dɛt͡s dèts	dɛs dès	dɛu deu	dɛu deu	dieθ~deu diez / deu	*dɛt͡s

The numbers 1 and 2 have both feminine and masculine forms agreeing with the object they modify.
