= Eugui =

Eugui may refer to:

- Eugui (village), a locality in Esteribar, Navarre
- García de Eugui (died 1408), Navarrese historian
- Héctor Hugo Eugui (born 1947), Uruguayan footballer
