= Pedro de Valencia =

Pedro de Valencia may refer to:

- Pedro de Valencia, Benedictine prior of Santa María la Real de Nájera (1535–1538) who wrote the Crónica of Pedro de Valencia
- Pedro de Valencia (humanist) (1555–1620), Spanish humanist, bible scholar and chronicler
- Pedro de Valencia (bishop) (died 1631), bishop of La Paz (1617–1631) and Santiago de Guatemala (1615–1617)
