= Glosas Emilianenses =

Glosses showcasing early forms of Hispanic Romance and Basque

- Royal Academy of History
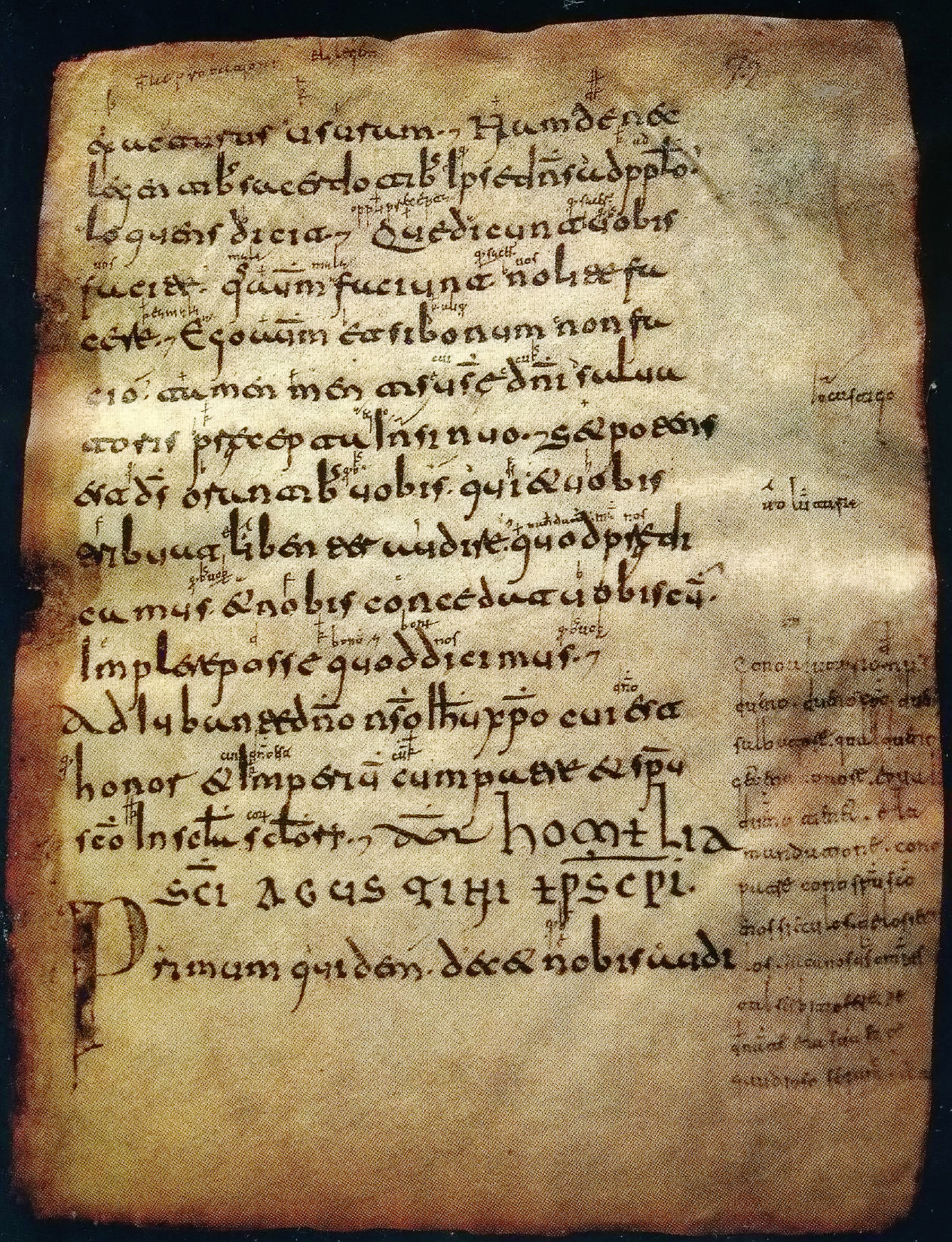
- Page 72 of the Aemilianensis 60 codex
- Type: Religious
- Date: 9th-11th centuries
- Place of origin: Monasteries of San Millán de la Cogolla
- Discovered: 20th century

The Glosas Emilianenses (Spanish for "glosses of [the monastery of Saint] Millán/Emilianus") are glosses written in the 10th or 11th century to a 9th-century Latin codex called the Aemilianensis 60; the name Glosas Emilianenses is also sometimes applied to the entire codex. These marginalia are important as early attestations of both an Iberian Romance variety (similar to modern Spanish or Navarro-Aragonese) and of medieval Basque. The codex is now in Madrid, but came from the monastic library at San Millán de la Cogolla. The anonymous author of the glosses is presumed to be a monk at San Millán de Suso, one of two monastic sites in the village.

== Composition ==
The codex itself is a compilation of several codices, including Verba seniorum, Passio martyrum Cosmae et Damiani, Sermones beati Augustini. It also contains glosses and marginalia that are written in three languages:

- A simplified version of Latin
- The medieval form of a Hispanic Romance language (traditionally regarded as Castilian or Old Spanish, but now most often classified as the Old Riojan dialect of Navarro-Aragonese)
- Medieval Basque

== Significance ==
Aemilianensis 60 has been publicized as the earliest known codex with inscriptions in Basque, though other codices are posited.

The Glosses were formerly considered to include the first instances of early Spanish. San Millán de la Cogolla's reputation as the "birthplace of the Spanish language" was important in its designation as a World Heritage Site ("cultural" type) in 1997. However, in November 2010, the Royal Spanish Academy declared that the first appearances of written Spanish can be found in the Cartularies of Valpuesta, 9th-century documents from the province of Burgos. These cartularies include, like the glosses, a mix of Latin and Iberian Romance vocabulary, but are earlier in date. The cartularies do not however present a Romance grammatical structure distinct from Latin, so in that regard the glosses are still the first.

== Background ==
=== Location of the monastery ===
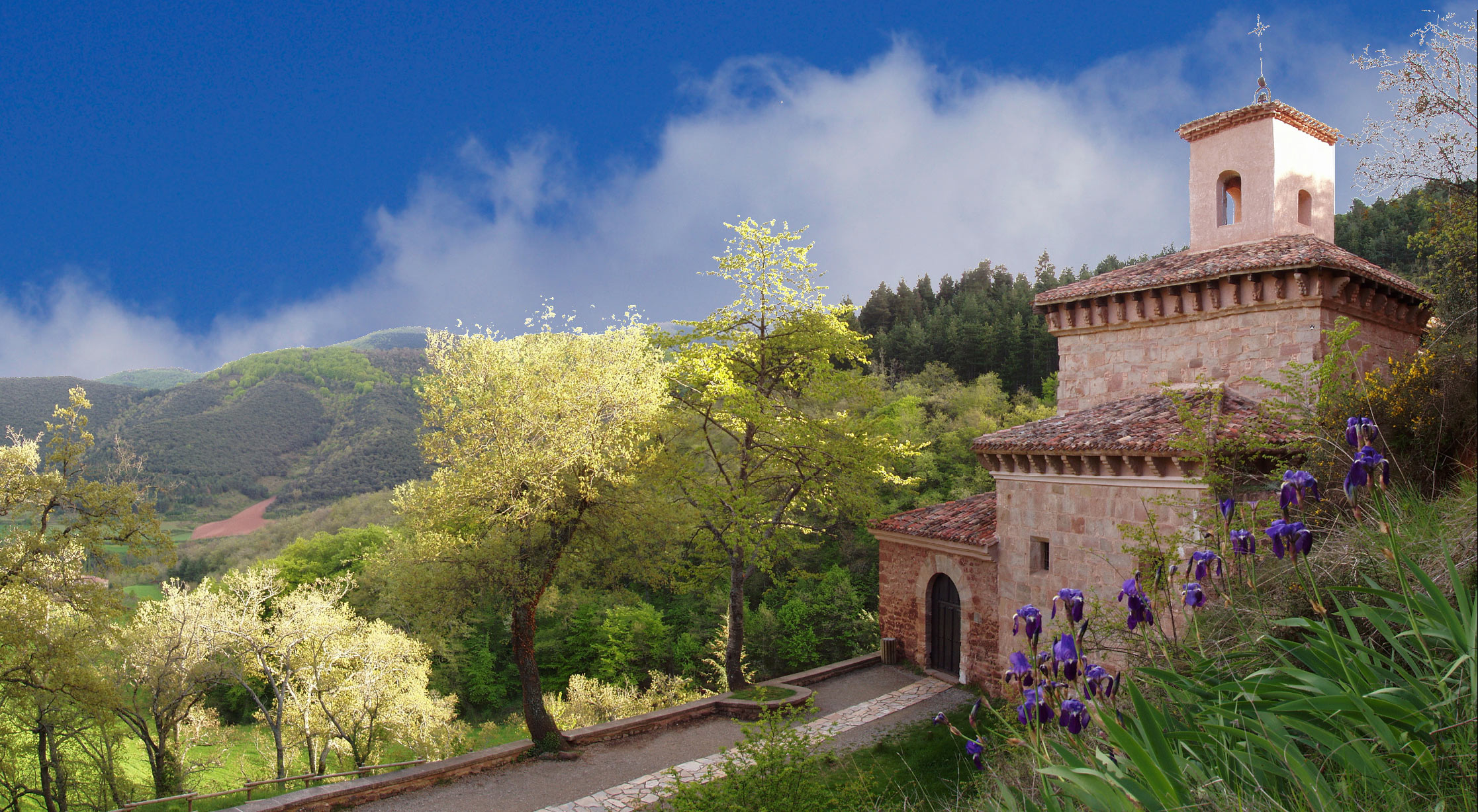
Suso, the upper of the San Millán monasteries.

The monasteries of San Millán de Suso (6th century) and San Millán de Yuso (11th century) are two monasteries situated in the village of San Millán de la Cogolla, La Rioja, Spain. The two monasteries' names Suso and Yuso mean the "upper" and the "lower" in archaic Castilian, respectively. The monasteries are named after Saint Emilian of Cogolla (Spanish: Millán).

The name of the glosses, Glosas Emilianenses, which can be translated as "Emilian glosses", refers to the name of the monastery where they were preserved and most likely composed. The codex is known as Aemilianensis 60 (Aemilianus is Latin for Emilian, "Millán" or "Emiliano" in modern Spanish)

=== Location of the glosses ===
The anonymous author of the glosses is believed to have been a monk at the Suso, or upper, monastery. The codex was preserved in the monastery library at Yuso (the lower re-foundation of the monastery) until it was confiscated during the Trienio Liberal as part of the expropriation of monastic property which took place in Spain in the 19th century. The manuscript's current location is the Royal Academy of History in Madrid, which holds other material from the monastic library such as the San Millán Beatus. The monastic library retains the Becerro Galicano.

There have been calls for the codex to be returned to La Rioja. In 2023 the government of the autonomous community was considering making a formal request.

=== Linguistic and political situation ===
Map showing the major territorial situation around the year 1000 AD. Almanzor (Al-Mansur) campaigns and "razzias" to Christian territory. Green: Caliphate of Cordoba. Dark green: conquests of Almanzor. Khakis: Christian kingdoms.

The original place where the glosses were written is uncertain (M. C. Díaz y Díaz has proposed the Pyrenees), but it is often assumed to be San Millán.

The vernacular language in La Rioja, the province where the monastery is situated, is now Spanish. However, there are some Basque toponyms in the locality, e.g. Ezcaray. At the time the Glosses were composed, the monastery was located in the Kingdom of Navarre much of which was Basque-speaking. Medieval Basque and Iberian Romance would have been the vernacular languages in the region surrounding the monastery. The variety of Iberian Romance spoken at San Millán perhaps had the character of a bridge language, facilitating communication and cultural exchange between different linguistic groups.

The glosses are not the only manuscript from the monastery to contain a linguistic mix. Another example is its medieval cartulary known as the Becerro Galicano, which is of considerable philological interest. It has been said that this supposedly Latin text is "profoundly influenced by early Castilian, to which an abundance of Basque names is added to form a singularly complex linguistic mix".

=== Discovery ===
The significance of the glosses was recognised in the early twentieth century. The key researcher in their discovery was Manuel Gómez-Moreno Martínez. His main focus of study at the time was architecture, but he recognised their importance, made a transcript and mentioned them in a periodical dealing with Spain's cultural heritage, the Boletín de la Sociedad Española de Excursiones. He brought them to the attention of the philologist Ramón Menéndez Pidal, who discussed them in his Orígenes del español (1926).

== Romance glosses ==
Some of the marginalia are grammar notes, others are additions, and others, glosses. There is still some debate as to whether the Iberian Romance language of the glosses should be classed as an early form of Castilian or of Aragonese, although some recent studies show that most features belong indeed to the latter. It is not the only text to be difficult to classify: other texts traditionally assumed to be in Old Spanish, like the Kharjas, are proved to be in a different medieval Romance, Mozarabic, which happens to be classified along with Aragonese in a Pyrenean-Mozarabic group. Some scholars have proposed that it is anachronistic to classify such varieties of Ibero-Romance according to dialectal labels based on geographical particularism before the thirteenth century, leaving the Glosas to be understood as "in an unspecialized informal register of Ibero-Romance".

=== Text and translation ===
The longest gloss appears on page 72 of the manuscripts. The Spanish philologist Dámaso Alonso called this little prayer the "first cry of the Spanish language" (in Spanish: "el primer vagido de la lengua española").

Audio file of gloss "Cono ajutorio de nuestro dueno..." in restored pronunciation

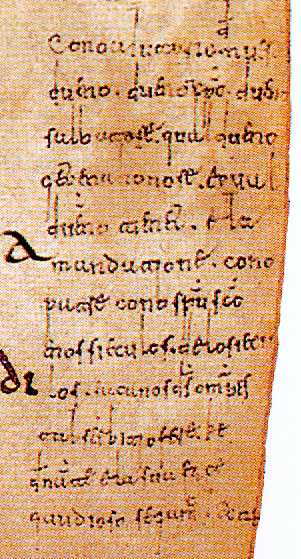
Detail of the gloss from page 72

Old text (some of the paleographic abbreviations cannot be rendered properly in Unicode)
Con o aiutorio de nuestro
dueno dueno χρ̅ο, dueno
ſalbatore, qual dueno
yet ena honore et qual
duenno tienet ela
mandatione con o
patre con o ſp̅u ſc̅o
en oſ ſieculoſ de lo ſieculoſ. facanoſ d̅ſ̅ om̅p̅eſ
tal serbitio fere ke
denante ela sua face
gaudioſo ſeyamuſ. Amen.

Translation
With the help of our
lord Lord Christ, Lord
Savior, Lord
who is in honor,
Lord that has
command with
the Father, with the Holy Spirit
for ever and ever.
God Omnipotent, make us
do such a service that
before His face
joyful we are. Amen.

=== Comparative table ===
Comparison of some words used in the glosses, along with their current corresponding forms in Aragonese, Spanish and Latin language. English translation provided.

Glosses	Aragonese	Spanish	Latin	Translation to English
de loſ (delo)	de los, d'os	de los	< DE ILLOS	of the (masculine, plural article)
ela	a, la, l'	la	< ILLA	the (feminine singular article)
ena, enoſ	en a, en os	en la, en los	< IN ILLAM, IN ILLOS	in the (Latin accusative, feminine singular and masculine plural articles)
fere	fer	hacer	< FACERE	to make
ſieculoſ	sieglos	(sieglos >) siglos	< SAECULA	centuries
yet	ye	es	< EST	is (3rd person, singular, verb "to be")

== Basque glosses ==
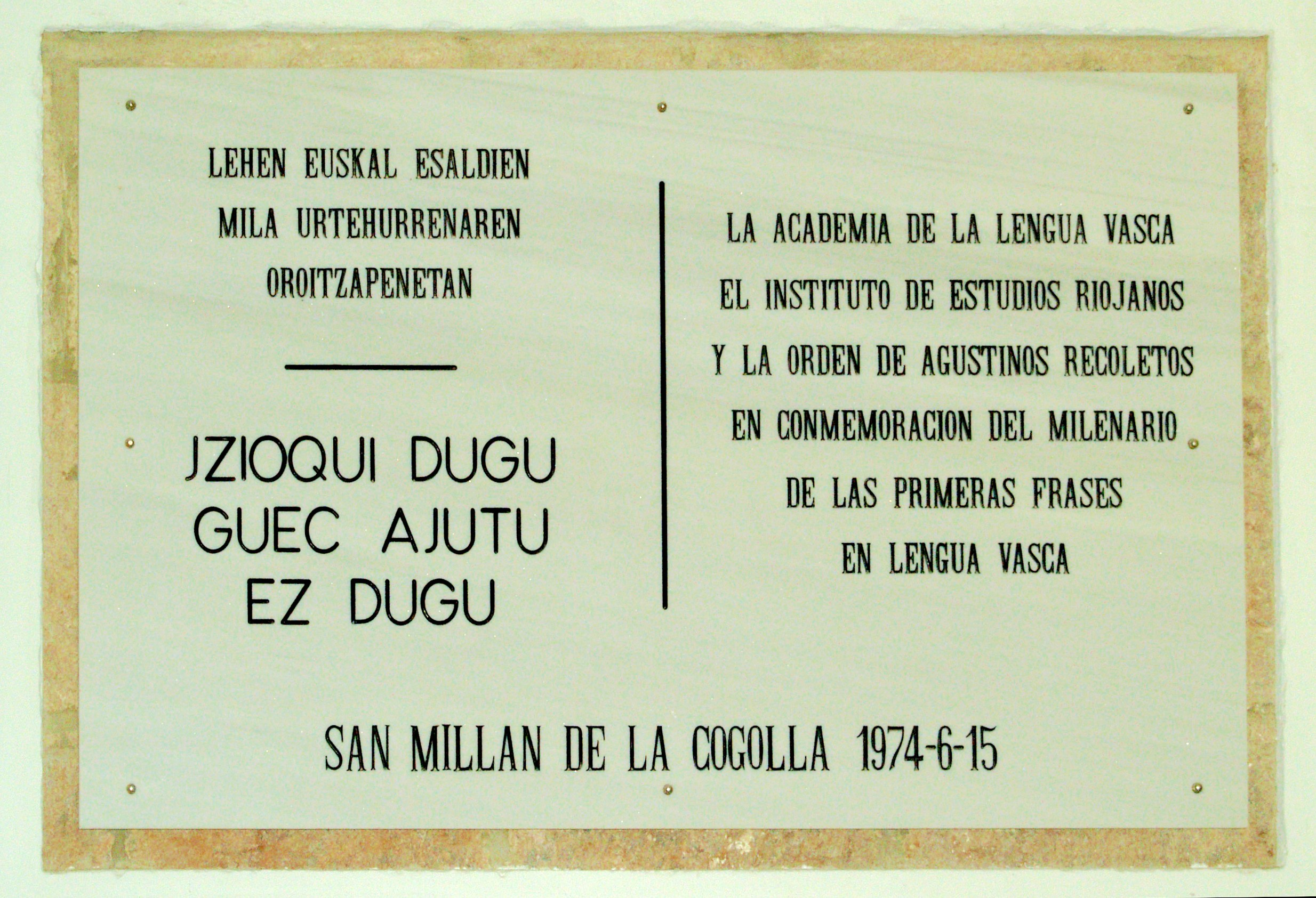
Plaque at Yuso monastery commemorating "the first sentences in the Basque language"

Only two of the glosses in Aemilianensis 60 (of a total of about one thousand) are actually in Basque. These short texts (only 6 words in total) can be seen on the 1974 plaque. However, it has been suggested that some of the Romance glosses reflect the influence of the Basque language, the implication being that their author was a fluent Basque-speaker.

== See also ==
- Spanish language
- Monasteries of San Millán de la Cogolla
- Navarro-Aragonese dialect
- Early Spanish Literature and the Middle Ages
- Basque language
