= Iberian Romance languages =

Language group from the Iberian Peninsula

Iberian Romance
- Ibero-Romance, Iberian, Southwestern Shifted Romance (Note: If Pyrenean–Mozarabic or Unshifted Western Romance is not included.)
- Geographic distribution: Originally Iberian Peninsula and French Catalonia; now worldwide
- Linguistic classification: Indo-European: Italic; Latino-Faliscan; Latin; Romance; Italo-Western; Western Romance; Gallo-Iberian?; Iberian Romance
- Subdivisions: West Iberian; Occitano-Romance? (Note: Sometimes considered part of Gallo-Romance, and is not always considered monophyletic even when included here.); Navarro-Aragonese? (Note: Sometimes considered part of a Pyrenean–Mozarabic or Unshifted Western Romance branch.); Mozarabic? (Note: Sometimes considered part of a Pyrenean–Mozarabic or Unshifted Western Romance branch.)

Language codes
- Glottolog: sout3183 Shifted Iberian unsh1234 Aragonese–Mozarabic

The Iberian Romance, Ibero-Romance or sometimes Iberian languages (Note: Iberian languages is also used as a more inclusive term for all languages spoken on the Iberian Peninsula, which in antiquity included the non-Indo-European Iberian language.) are a group of Romance languages that developed on the Iberian Peninsula, an area consisting primarily of Spain, Portugal, Gibraltar, Andorra and French Catalonia. They are today more commonly separated into West Iberian, East Iberian or Occitano-Romance (Catalan/Valencian and Occitan) and Southern Iberian (Andalusi Romance, also known as Mozarabic) language groups. East Iberian's classification is a subject of ongoing scholarly debate, as some argue that the Occitano-Romance languages, composed of Occitan along with Catalan/Valencian, are better classified as Gallo-Romance languages.

Evolved from the Vulgar Latin of Iberia, the most widely spoken Iberian Romance languages are Spanish and Portuguese, followed by Catalan and Galician. These languages also have their own regional and local varieties. Based on mutual intelligibility, Dalby counts seven "outer" languages, or language groups: Galician-Portuguese, Spanish, Asturleonese, "Wider"-Aragonese, "Wider"-Catalan, Provençal+Lengadocian, and "Wider"-Gascon.

In addition to those languages, there are a number of Portuguese-based creole languages and Spanish-based creole languages, for instance Papiamento.

== Origins and development ==
Consuelo López Morillas criticizes this kind of a representation of the linguistic landscape in medieval Iberia for equating linguistic frontiers with political frontiers, and for deceptively fragmenting Romance into several varieties—throughout the peninsula people described their language as ladino instead of leonés, navarro, etc.

Like all Romance languages, the Iberian Romance languages descend from Vulgar Latin, the nonstandard (in contrast to Classical Latin) form of the Latin language spoken by soldiers and merchants throughout the Roman Empire. With the expansion of the empire, Vulgar Latin came to be spoken by inhabitants of the various Roman-controlled territories. Latin and its descendants have been spoken in Iberia since the Punic Wars, when the Romans conquered the territory (see Roman conquest of Hispania).

The modern Iberian Romance languages were formed roughly through the following process:

- The Romanization of the local Iberian population.
- The diversification of Latin spoken in Iberia, with slight differences depending on location.
- The break up of Ibero-Romance into several dialects.

- Ibero‑Romance
  - Old Leonese
    - Asturian-Leonese (ast)
    - Mirandese (mwl)
  - Old-Castilian
    - Spanish (spa)
  - Galician-Portuguese
    - Portuguese (por)
    - Galician (glg)
    - Fala (fax)

- Development of Old Spanish, Galician-Portuguese, Old Leonese and Navarro-Aragonese (the West Iberian languages) and early Catalan language from Latin between the eighth and tenth centuries. The genetic classification of early Navarro-Aragonese, Catalan, and Occitan is unsettled. Some scholars place them within Ibero-Romance (hence they would be East Iberian), others place them instead within Gallo-Romance. Aragonese is further disputed between the East and West Iberian groups.
- Further development into modern Spanish, Portuguese, Aragonese, Asturleonese, Galician, Catalan (see languages of Iberia: languages of Spain, languages of Portugal and languages of Andorra) between the fifteenth and twentieth centuries.

== Common traits between Portuguese, Spanish and Catalan ==
This list points to common traits of these Iberian subsets, especially when compared to the other Romance languages in general. Thus, changes such as Catalan vuit/huit and Portuguese oito vs. Spanish ocho are not shown here, as the change -it- > -ch- is exclusive to Spanish among the Iberian Romance languages.

=== Between Portuguese, Spanish and Catalan ===
==== Phonetic ====
- The length difference between r/rr is preserved through phonetic means as [ɾ]/[r], so that the second consonant in words such as caro and carro are not the same in any of the three.
- Latin U remains [u] and is not changed to [y].

==== Semantic ====
- The Iberian Romance languages all maintain a complete essence-state distinction in the copula (the verb "to be"). The "essence" form (Portuguese and Spanish ser and Catalan ser and ésser) is derived in whole or in part from the Latin sum (the Latin copula), while the "state" form (estar in all three languages) is derived from the Latin stāre ("to stand").

=== Between Spanish and Catalan, but not Portuguese ===
==== Phonetic ====
- The distinction between Latin short -n-, -l- and long -nn-, -ll- was preserved by means of palatalizing -nn-, -ll- to /ɲ, ʎ/, as in Latin annum > Spanish año, Catalan any vs. Latin manum > Spanish mano, Old Catalan man (modern Catalan mà). This also affects some initial L in Catalan. However, in most dialects of Spanish, original /ʎ/ has become delateralized. Portuguese maintains the distinction, but in a different way; compare ano vs. mão.

=== Between Spanish and Portuguese, but not Catalan ===
==== Phonetic ====
- Initial Latin CL/FL/PL are palatalized further than in Standard Italian, and become indistinguishable (to CH in Portuguese and LL in Spanish).
- Final e/o remains (although its pronunciation changed in Portuguese, and some dialects drop final E).

==== Grammatical ====
- The synthetic preterite, inherited from earlier stages of Latin, remains the main past tense.

=== Between Portuguese and Catalan, but not Spanish ===
==== Phonetic ====
- Velarized L [ɫ], which existed in Latin, is preserved at the end of syllables, and was later generalized to all positions in most dialects of both languages.
- Stressed Latin e/o, both open and closed, is preserved so and does not become a diphthong.

== Statuses ==
Politically (not linguistically), there are now four major officially recognised Iberian Romance languages:

- Spanish (see names given to the Spanish language), is the national and official language of 21 countries, including Spain. Spanish is the fourth-most widely spoken language in the world, with over 570 total million speakers, and the second-most widely spoken native language. It has a number of dialects and varieties.
- Portuguese, official language in nine countries including Portugal and Brazil. After Spanish, Portuguese is the second most widely spoken Romance language in the world with over 250 million speakers, currently ranked seventh by number of native speakers. Various Portuguese dialects exist outside of the European standard spoken in Portugal.
- Catalan is the official language in Andorra and co-official in the Spanish autonomous communities of Catalonia, Balearic Islands and Valencian Community (where it is known as Valencian), and the Italian city of Alghero. It is also spoken in the French department of Pyrénées-Orientales (Northern Catalonia) without official recognition. Catalan is closely related to Occitan, with the two languages having been treated as one in studies by Occitanist linguists (such as Pierre Bec, or more recently Domergue Sumien). When not treated as one, the two languages are widely classified together as Occitano-Romance languages, a group which is itself sometimes grouped with the Gallo-Romance languages. Catalan has two main dialectal branches (Eastern and Western Catalan) and several subdialects, and is spoken by about 10 million people (ranking the seventy-fifth most spoken language in the world), mostly in five variants: Central Catalan, Northern Catalan, Northwestern Catalan, Valencian and Balearic.
- Galician, co-official in Galicia and also spoken in adjacent western parts of Asturias and Castile and León. Closely related to Portuguese, with Spanish influence. It shares the same origin as Portuguese, from the medieval Galician-Portuguese. Modern Galician is spoken by around 3.2 million people and is ranked 160th by number of speakers.

Additionally, Asturian (dialect of Asturleonese), although not an official language, is recognised by the autonomous community of Asturias. It is one of the Asturleonese dialects along with Mirandese, which in Portugal holds an official status as a minority language.

== Family tree ==
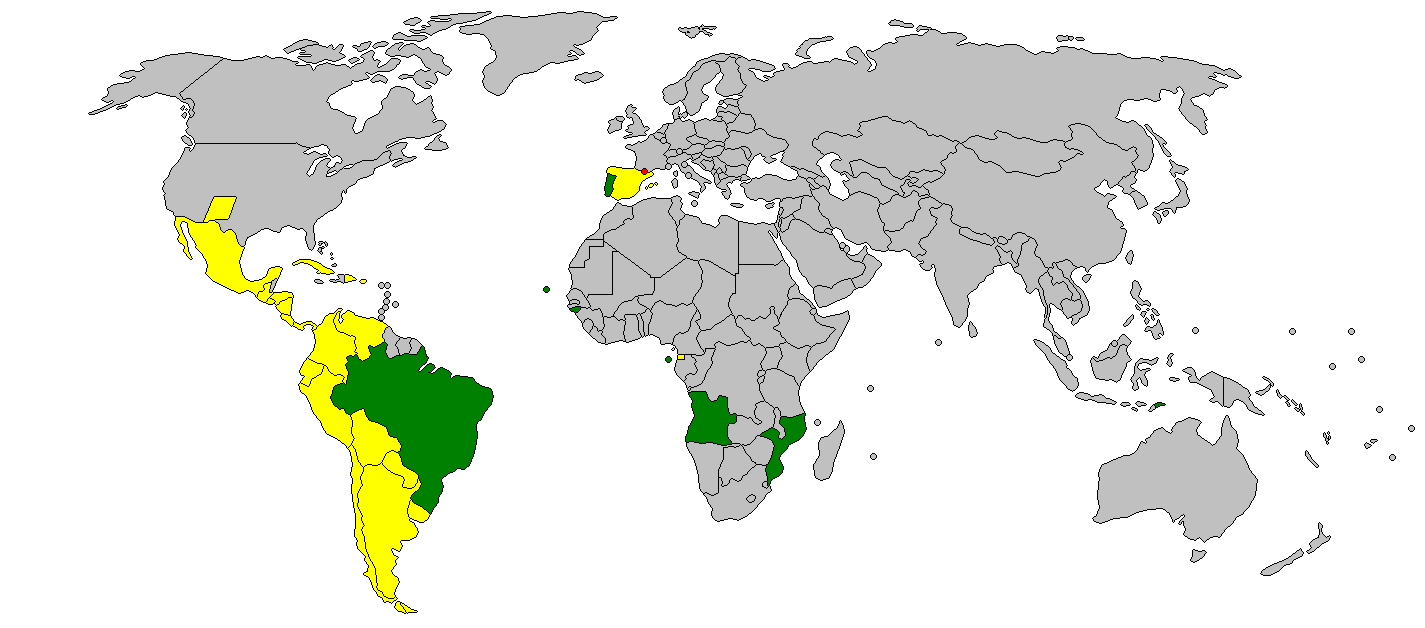
Ibero-Romance languages around the world

The Iberian Romance languages are a conventional group of Romance languages. Many authors use the term in a geographical sense although they are not necessarily a phylogenetic group (the languages grouped as Iberian Romance may not all directly descend from a common ancestor). Phylogenetically, there is disagreement about what languages should be considered within the Iberian Romance group; for example, some authors consider that East Iberian, also called Occitano-Romance, could be more closely related to languages of northern Italy (or also Franco-Provençal, the langues d'oïl and Rhaeto-Romance). A common conventional geographical grouping is the following:

- East Iberian
- West Iberian

Daggers (†) indicate extinct languages

- Iberian Romance languages
  - East Iberian (alternatively classified as Occitano-Romance languages)
    - Catalanic
      - Catalan
      - Judaeo-Catalan†
    - Occitanic
      - Gardiol
      - Occitan
      - Shuadit†
  - West Iberian
    - Asturleonese
      - Asturian
      - Cantabrian
      - Extremaduran
      - Leonese
      - Mirandese
    - Castilian
      - Spanish
      - Judaeo-Spanish
    - Galician-Portuguese
      - Eonavian
      - Fala
      - Galician
      - Judaeo-Portuguese†
      - Portuguese
    - Pyrenean–Mozarabic
      - Navarro-Aragonese†
        - Aragonese
          - Valencian Aragonese†
          - Judaeo-Aragonese†
        - Navarrese†
        - Riojan†
      - Mozarabic†

== See also ==
- Languages of Iberia
- Barranquenho
