= Navarrese Romance =

Extinct romance language of Navarre

Navarrese
- Navarrese Romance
- Romance navarro
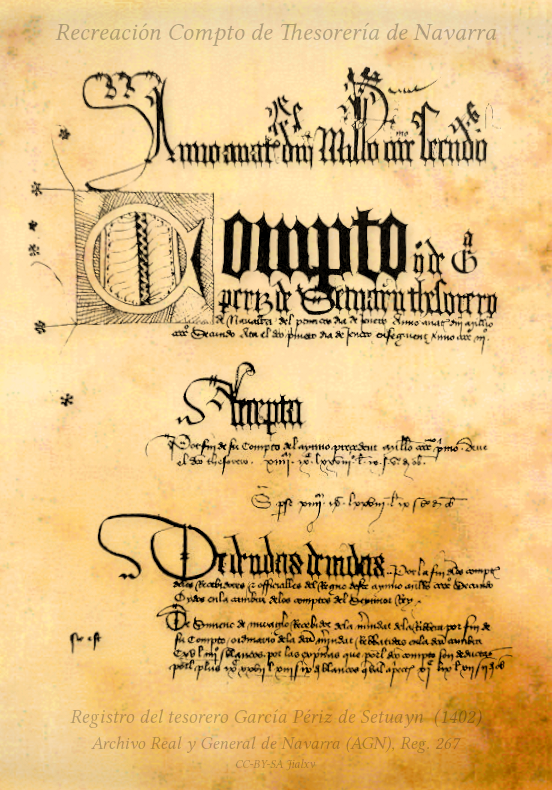
- Treasury register in the Court of Auditors of Navarre of 1402 (AGN, Comptos Reg. 267)
- Native to: Northern Spain
- Region: Kingdom of Navarre
- Ethnicity: Navarrese
- Era: 10–17th centuries
- Language family: Indo-European: Italic; Latino-Faliscan; Latinic; Romance; Italo-Western; Western Romance; (disputed); Pyrenean–Mozarabic?; Navarro-Aragonese; Navarrese
- Early forms: Old Latin: Vulgar Latin; Proto-Romance; (unclassified); Navarro-Aragonese
- Writing system: Latin

Language codes
- ISO 639-3: None (mis)
- Glottolog: None
- Navarrese Romance

Navarrese Romance (Spanish: navarrés), simplified as Navarrese is one of the extinct Iberian Romance languages, which was used during the 10th to 15th centuries in the Kingdom of Navarre. In addition to the use of Medieval Latin, present as a general phenomenon throughout Western Europe, and Occitan, more sporadically, practically all medieval Navarrese documentation, both public and private, is written in Navarrese Romance.

According to linguists, this Romance dialect, both because of its emergence in a predominantly Basque-speaking area and because of its secular coexistence with it, the origin and development of Navarrese offers problems and peculiar characteristics in the history of Spanish linguistics. Despite the volume of legal and chronicle texts of the Navarrese Romance until the beginning of the 20th century it was considered that they were composed in Castilian or Gascon or in a mixture of both.

== Philological context ==
In 1980, Ricardo Cierbide summarized the fact that throughout the centuries, especially since the end of the 15th century, Navarrese and non-Navarrese showed ignorance of the linguistic fact of the existence of Navarrese Romance and considered it purely and simply as Castilian. These positions have lasted until 1970, with specific exceptions.

In his work on Navarrese literature, Carlos Mata Induráin , professor of literature at the University of Navarra, said that Navarrese Romance is the Romance dialect derived from Latin in Navarrese territory, traditionally studied together with Navarro-Aragonese, although with its own linguistic features that allow it to be differentiated, as demonstrated by the studies of Fernando González Ollé and Carmen Saralegui, as well as Ricardo Cierbide, among others. This author also emphasizes that Navarrese Romance was the official language of the Navarrese Court, since it facilitated contacts with the other Christian kingdoms.

=== The birth and emergence of Romance: Romanization as a basis ===
According to González Ollé, the birth of Navarrese Romance, with the exception of the Ribera de Navarra, occurs in a Basque-speaking environment where it develops and, through it and at its expense, it spreads socially and territorially. This original situation is common with Castilian, at least in part, depending on the scope that each person grants, with respect to the latter, to the Basque substratum, which is indubitable in the case of Navarre, where ordinary personal coexistence - not just the strict adstratum - has been maintained until the present (to a very variable degree, depending on the times and areas).

This genesis requires the conjunction of several factors:

- The Romanization of a large part of the current territory known as Navarre with an increasingly horizontal extension and vertical public intensity according to the contributions regularly made by archaeology and onomastics.
- Due to the role played, the Vascones, according to written sources, constitute an element of support for the Roman conquest favoring this cooperative work as a motivating factor for the growing foundations on the territory converted into the place of passage of the Roman troops that participated in the fights against the Cantabri and Astures.

The deployment of the Roman road network through this territory, both main roads (between Bordeaux and Astorga or between Tarragona and Astorga) and more secondary ones (between Pamplona and Zaragoza via Santacara, or between Gallipienzo and Eslava up to Olite and Cascante) favours the proliferation of Mansio at their foot.

- It is quite plausible and possible that, after the disappearance of Roman authority, there was a recovery of the Vascones' territory during the final stage of the Roman Empire. However, this process would be slowed down, and even gradually reversed, with the formation of the Iberian Romance languages, which possibly had various initial foci in their genesis.

One such focus could be located in the space bathed by the middle course of the Aragon River, between Tiermas and Gallipienzo, as well as by the Onsella River (Valdonsella), a region later disputed by the County of Aragon and the Kingdom of Pamplona where the birth is verified, first, of the Kingdom of Pamplona, as well as the County of Aragon that, later, will become a kingdom, even sharing the occupants of the throne, but with an expansion greater in land and time than the previous one until the end of the Middle Ages. In those early stages there is documentary evidence of the emergence of Sancho I of Pamplona in the surroundings of the Sierra de Leyre.

=== Navarrese, Aragonese and Old Riojan: breaking old postulates ===
At the beginning of the 20th century it has been linked to Aragonese, calling both the Navarro-Aragonese language, although with a clear inaccuracy since serious and balanced comparative studies were lacking, there being an abundant bibliography on the ancient texts and modern dialects of Aragon that had hardly any counterpart with its congeners of Navarre. The authority of Ramón Menéndez Pidal in this matter established the compound Navarro-Aragonese, seconded, without further study, by other authors, assuming the lack of a substantial differentiation between Navarrese and Aragonese, even Old Riojan and reaching the rank of generally accepted doctrine that they were simple names of the same language, but without being able to affirm how it has proceeded to affirm this identity given the lack of a regular process of previous studies that would contribute to such an affirmation.

On the contrary, during the last third of the 20th century, initial efforts were perceived to alleviate this perspective, so bleak, of the state of knowledge of the Navarrese Romance with the doctoral thesis of Ricardo Cierbide, Romance navarro antiguo: (siglos 10 al 15: estudio realizar sobre documentos originales), presented at the Complutense University of Madrid in 1970, and with the extensive article by Fernando González Ollé, El romance navarro, whose objective was to demonstrate the existence of a Romance language of its own in this territory. Both facts were decisive in the change of direction in this matter in the following decades.

Early on (1975) we have the doctoral thesis, promoted by the Chair of Historical Grammar at the University of Zaragoza, on The Navarrese Romance in the manuscripts of the ancient charter of the Fuero General of Navarre where the author, María Ángeles Líbano Zumalacárregui, (later professor of Spanish Language at the University of the Basque Country) collaborated with this contribution to the critical edition of the so-called Fuero Antiguo that ended up integrated into the Fuero General de Navarra initiated in the Department of Medieval History of that university. With her research, numerous spellings and phonetic, morphological and syntactical elements that characterize the Navarrese Romance used in its writing are provided.

In 1993 she presented her doctoral thesis Carmela Pérez-Salazar Resano published her thesis in 1995 on The Navarrese Romance in royal documents of the 14th century (1322-1349), a linguistic study of a diplomatic documentary collection, with about 300 royal documents written in Latin, in Navarrese Romance and Old French, to demonstrate that the development of this romance towards Castilian solutions was due more to its own evolution than to Castilianization. In 1995, along the same lines, Cristina Tabernero Sala presented her research on The configuration of vocabulary in the Navarrese Romance: a study of royal documents from the 13th and 14th centuries, where the author defends the lexical identity of the Navarrese Romance during the Middle Ages, while delving into the lexical relationships of this romance with Aragonese, French and Occitan.

Finally, a year later (1996), Manuel Alvar published his Manual de dialectología hispánica: El español de España where for the first time in a dialectology manual Navarrese has an entry. It was written by Fernando González Ollé, who proceeds to justify the precarious attention deserved that is usually placed under Navarro-Aragonese, although without deserving any attention of its own while, on the contrary, there are other cases of dialectological individualization derived from the existence of medieval political divisions or by their continuation as traditional or administrative regions. Also in the same book, separately, also precedes the chapter on Aragonese signed by Manuel Alvar himself.

== Historical context ==
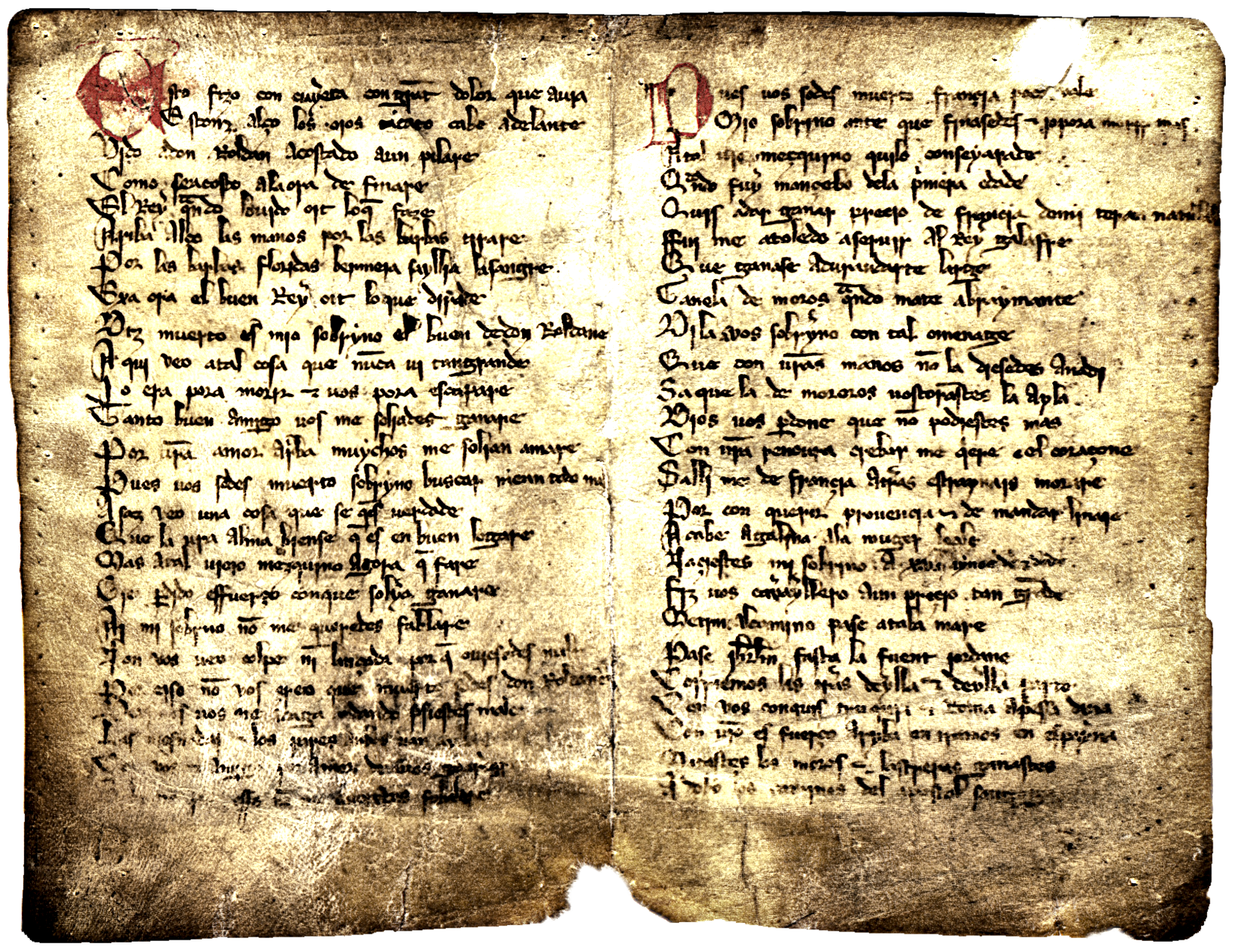
Song of Roncesvalles (p. 1v-2r) in Navarrese Romance.

The oldest known text in Navarrese Romance seems to be the granting of the Fuero de Jaca in 1171 to the inhabitants of Sangüesa by Sancho VI of Navarre:

Historical linguistic demography considers that, apart from the use in the cities of medieval Navarre of languages such as Gascon, Castilian or Provençal. During the Late Middle Ages Navarrese Romance was spoken more intensely south of the valleys of the Ega, Arga and Aragon rivers.

With the arrival on the throne of Navarre of the first French dynasties, the language seems to become a national issue (compared to the foreign ones who began to be constant in the Navarrese court), promoting its progressive use, to the detriment of Latin, in official documentation. It would be the Navarrese Romance language that, from the 13th century and especially the 14th century, would be predominant in the court and in the Chancery of Navarre, and in which a large part of the documentation of the Navarrese royalty would be written. In 1255, during the homage of loyalty paid to Theobald II of Navarre, several Navarrese lords promised to respect "your people of the French language and any other language that may be in your service". Language, or lack of it, was a determining requirement explicitly communicated to the occupant of the throne during the ceremony of the elevation of the king to determine the natives of the country and the "man of another land, or of foreign place or of foreign language" at the time of appointments to positions.

Furthermore, it was expressly identified as the official language of the kingdom in 1329, in the Cortes of Olite, and was designated in the documentation as the language of Navarre, and was expressly reinstated in 1350, during the royal coronation of Charles II of Navarre, or in 1390, during the coronation of his successor Charles III of Navarre. In a singular way, both the General Charter of Navarre , the masterpiece of medieval Navarrese private law, and its improvements are written in Navarrese Romance.

From the 15th century onwards, contact between Navarrese Romance and Castilian would produce a phenomenon of convergence between the two languages, a phenomenon that would lead to their complete replacement by Castilian in the 16th century.

== Documentary context ==
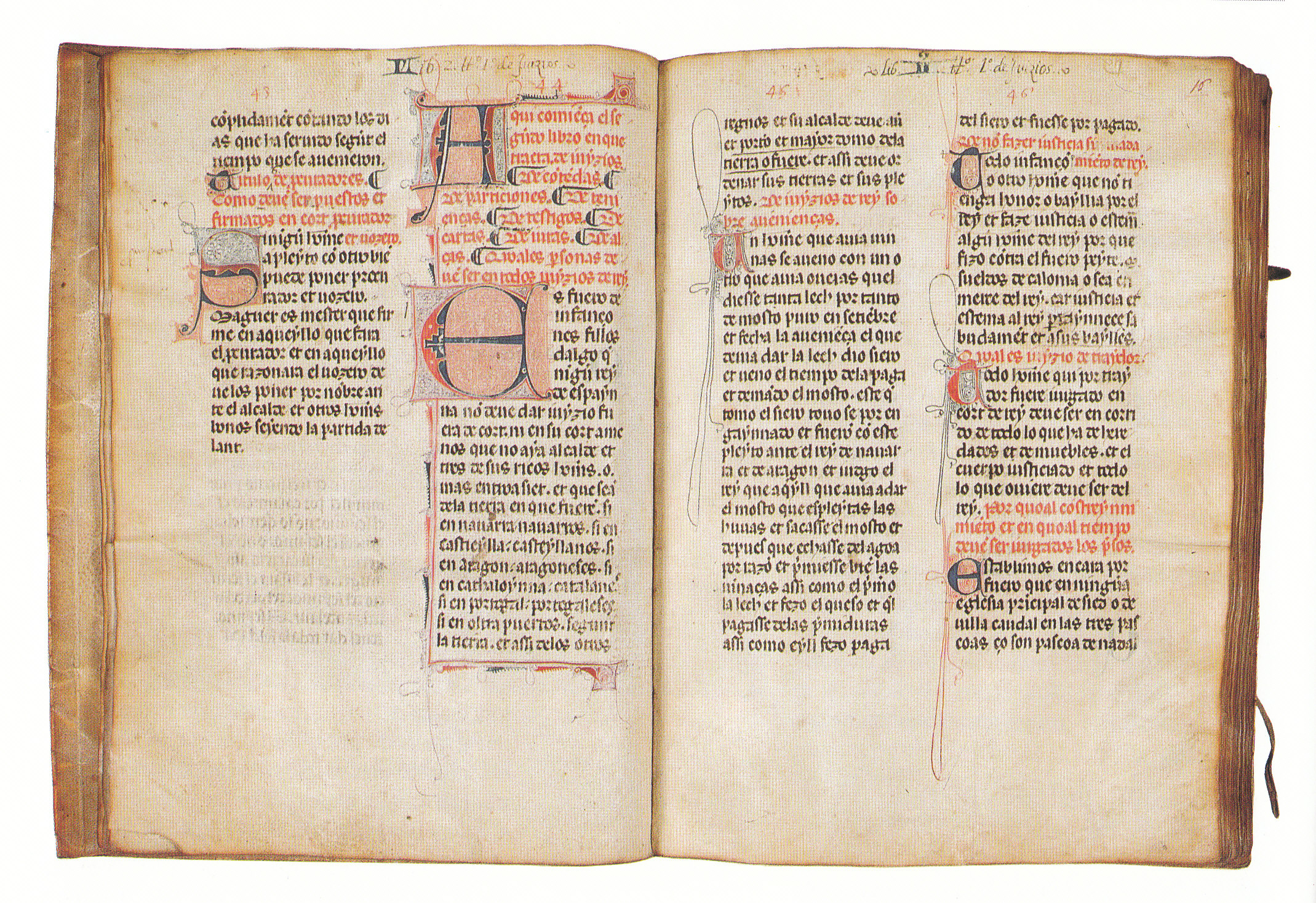
Codex of the General Charter of Navarre (14th century), written in Navarrese Romance.

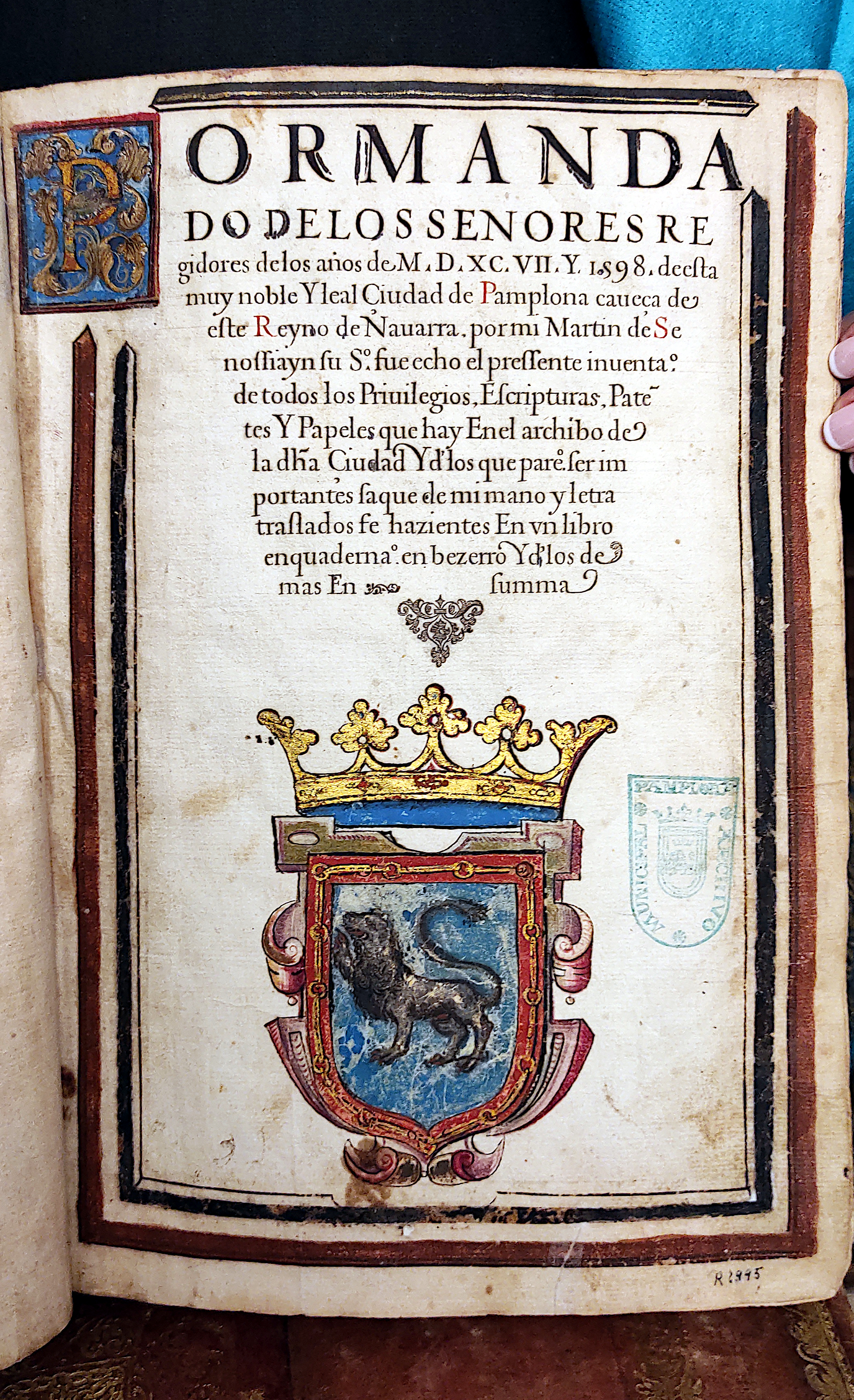
Privilege of the Union written in Navarrese Romance

In addition to the Liber Regum, which is the first Hispanic chronicle written in the vernacular and perhaps the first romance text of Hispanic literature, the Crónica d'Espayña by García de Eugui, the Crónica by Garcí López de Roncesvalles and the Crónica de los Reyes de Navarra by the Charles, Prince of Viana, we must mention the genealogical news that collect, at the end, some manuscripts of the Fuero General de Navarra. Under the name of Corónicas navarras they have been edited by Antonio Ubieto Arteta, for whom these brief texts had an independent life prior to their inclusion in the legal compilation.

Also worth mentioning in this section is the account From Estella to Seville. Accounts of a Journey (1352).

The manuscript entitled Book of Generations with a 16th century letter copies a work by Martín de Larraya that was written between 1258 and 1270. Its historical and literary value is scarce, but the linguistic one is more interesting since it contains a relatively early text, but the copy is late and in it still persist with intensity multiple features of the Navarrese dialect, since from the end of the 15th century and even before the language of the Navarrese documentation appears deeply Castilianized. The same generally happens with other contemporary Navarrese historical texts: the Chronicle of the Kings of Navarre by Diego Ramírez de Ávalos de la Piscina or in the Sum of the Chronicles of Navarre by an anonymous author.

== Survivals ==
As with the area where Aragonese was formerly spoken and which underwent a process of Castilianization, the Castilian vocabulary and speech of central, southern, and eastern Navarre have maintained until recently or retain today identifying features of Navarrese Romance, such as the aversion to words with proparoxytones.

Specifically, the following are attributable to the survival of linguistic forms of Navarrese:

- In the Eslava area, the oldest people used the ending -i for the first person of the imperfect tense, just as in present-day Ansó Aragonese. Example: teníai.
- The most widespread Navarrism is the anthroponym Javier (Xabier, Xavier), adapted to many Western languages, coming from the Basque Etxeberri, which means new house.
- In Navarrese regional law, the term municipal domain and the regional neighbourhoods still exist.
- It is possible that the Salacenco demonym for the inhabitants of the Salazar Valley is of Navarrese origin, as is the survival of the name Selva de Irati (Irati Forest), which in Spanish would be forest because the use of jungle for this type of plant formation has long since been lost.

== Orthography ==
Much like many other Romance languages, Navarrese is written in the Latin script with its own variations.

Medieval spellings for phonemes in Navarrese
Phoneme	Spelling(s)	Usage notes
[wa]	⟨oa⟩	
[ʎ]	⟨yll⟩, ⟨ill⟩, ⟨lli⟩, ⟨yl⟩, ⟨ll⟩, ⟨l⟩, ⟨lg⟩, ⟨li⟩, ⟨il⟩	
[ɲ]	⟨ynn⟩, ⟨yn⟩, ⟨nni⟩, ⟨jnn⟩, ⟨inn⟩, ⟨nn⟩, ⟨ng⟩, ⟨yn⟩, ⟨ny⟩, ⟨in⟩, ⟨ni⟩	
[ʃ]	⟨x⟩, ⟨xc⟩, ⟨sc⟩, ⟨xs⟩, ⟨iss⟩, ⟨yss⟩, ⟨ss⟩	⟨x⟩ is most commonly found in texts of non-native speakers and sparsely in texts written by native speakers.
[t͡ʃ]	⟨ch⟩, ⟨z⟩, ⟨ç⟩, ⟨s⟩, ⟨g⟩	⟨ch⟩ is the most common spelling.
[t͡s]	⟨ts⟩, ⟨tz⟩, ⟨ç⟩, ⟨z⟩	[t͡s] was represented by ⟨ç⟩ and ⟨z⟩ in word-final position.

== Bibliography ==
- Cierbide, Ricardo (1980), En torno a la problemática lingüística en la Navarra medieval (El romance navarro) (in Spanish), vol. 12, Fontes linguae vasconum: Studia et documenta, pp. 395–402, ISSN 0046-435X
- Líbano Zumalacárregui, Ángeles (1977). El romance navarro en los manuscritos del fuero antiguo del Fuero General de Navarra. Inst. Príncipe de Viana. ISBN 978-84-235-0086-4.
- Mata Induráin, Carlos (2007). Navarra-Literatura. Gobierno de Navarra. ISBN 978-84-235-2446-4.
- Menéndez Pidal, Ramón (1956). Orígenes del español. Estado lingüístico de la Península Ibérica hasta el siglo XI (4 ed.). Espasa-Calpe. ISBN 8423947521.
- Sarasa Echeverría, Sergio (2024), El léxico navarro y su pervivencia más allá de la Edad Media: Estudio de voces de raigambre navarroaragonesa en un inventario navarro del siglo XVIII (in Spanish), vol. 7, RILEX. Revista sobre investigaciones léxicas, pp. 33–58, doi:10.17561/rilex.7.2.8321, ISSN 2605-3136
- Ciérvide, Ricardo (1970). "El romance navarro antiguo". Fontes linguae vasconum: Studia et documenta (in Spanish). 6 (1): 271. ISSN 0046-435X.
  - González Ollé, Fernando (1970). Vascuence y romance en la historia lingüística de Navarra (in Spanish). Vol. L. Madrid: Boletín de la Real Academia Española. pp. 31–76. ISSN 0210-4822.
- González Ollé, Fernando (1972). Cofradía Gastronómica del Pimiento Seco (ed.). Vascuence y romance en la historia lingüística de Navarra (in Spanish). Pamplona.
- González Ollé, Fernando (1997). La función de Leire en la génesis y difusión del romance navarro, con noticia lingüística de su documentación (I) (in Spanish). Vol. 58. Príncipe de Viana. pp. 653–708. ISSN 0032-8472.
- González Ollé, Fernando (1996). "Navarro". Manual de dialectología hispánica: el español de España. Ariel lingüística (in Spanish). Ed. Ariel. pp. 305–316.
- González Ollé, Fernando (1987). Reconocimiento del romance navarro bajo Carlos II (1350) (in Spanish). Vol. 48. Príncipe de Viana. pp. 705–710. ISSN 0032-8472.
