= San Millán de la Cogolla =

- Municipality
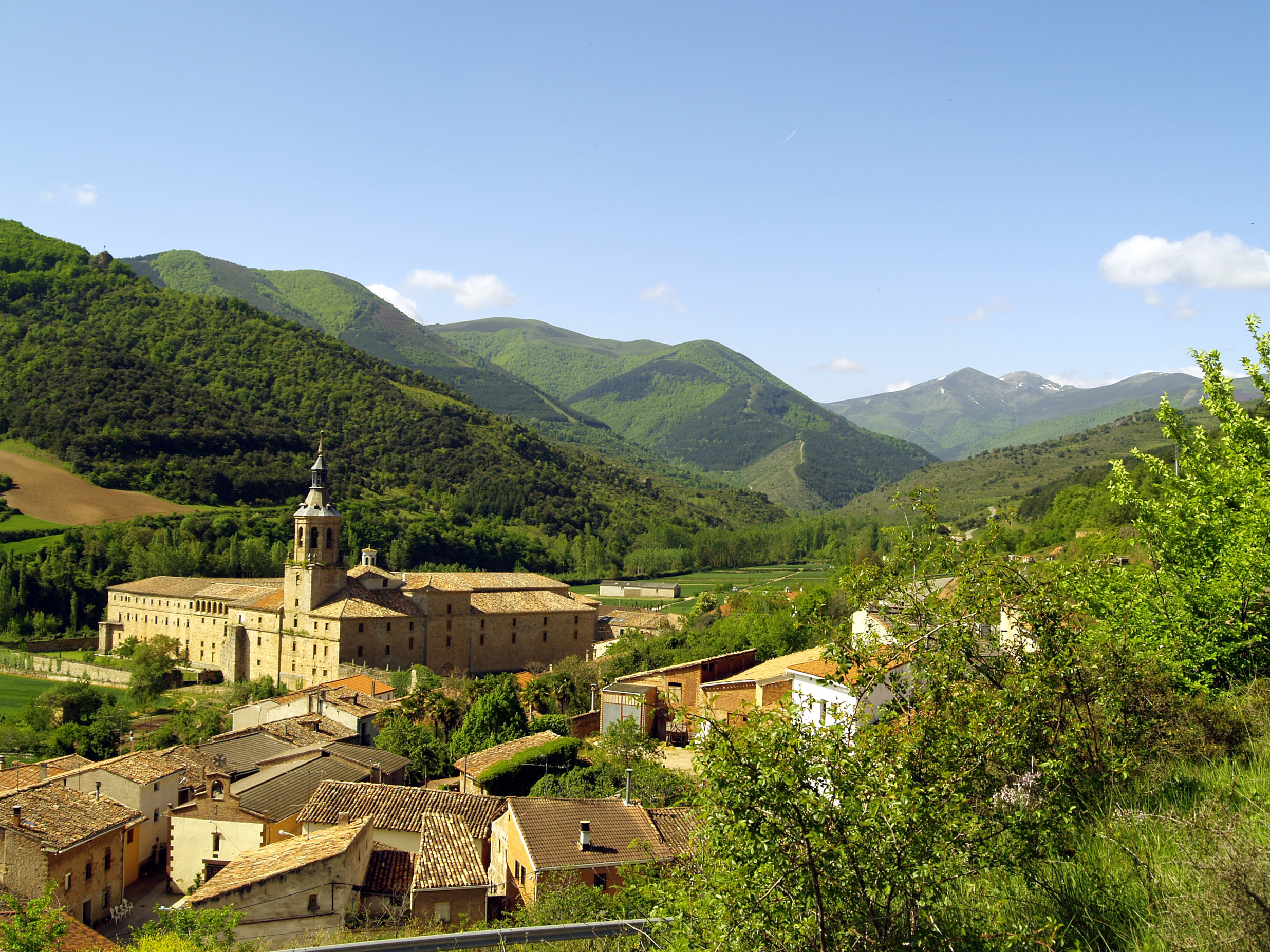

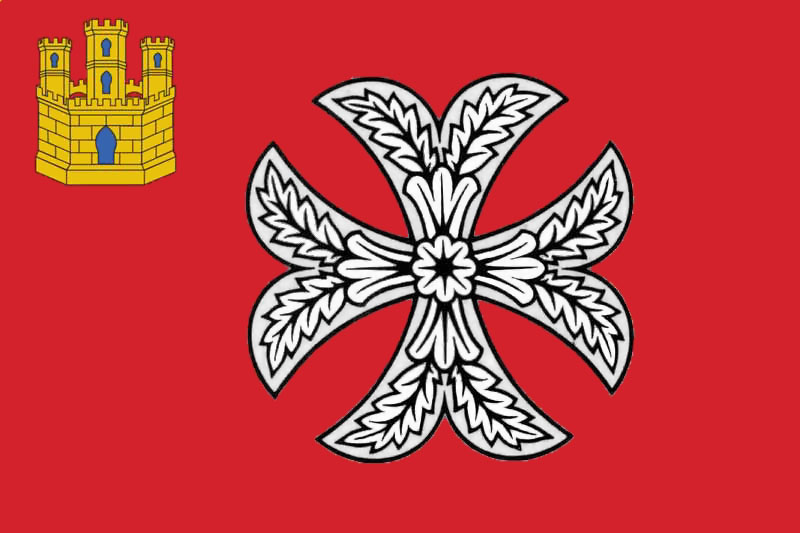
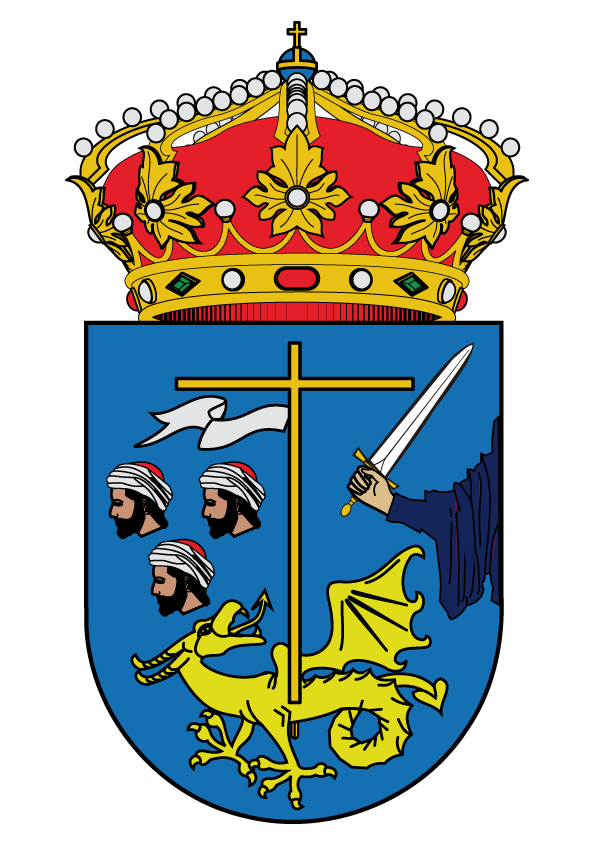
- Flag Coat of arms
- Interactive map of San Millán de la Cogolla
- Coordinates: 42°10′N 2°52′W
- Country: Spain
- Autonomous community: La Rioja
- Province: La Rioja
- Comarca: Nájera

Government
  - Mayor: María Pilar Mendoza Martínez (PSOE)

Area
  - Total: 31.19 km^{2} (12.04 sq mi)
- Elevation: 728 m (2,388 ft)

Population (2025-01-01)
  - Total: 214
  - Density: 6.86/km^{2} (17.8/sq mi)
- Demonym: Emilianenses
- Time zone: UTC+1 (CET)
  - Summer (DST): UTC+2 (CEST)
- Postal code: 26326
- Website: http://www.sanmillandelacogolla.es

San Millán de la Cogolla (Spanish pronunciation: [sam miˈʎan de la koˈɣoʎa]) is a sparsely populated municipality in La Rioja (Spain). The village is famous for its twin monasteries, Yuso and Suso (Monasterio de San Millán de Yuso and Monasterio de San Millán de Suso), which were declared a World Heritage Site in 1997. There were 293 inhabitants registered in 2009, the population having fallen significantly during the twentieth century.

== Birthplace of the Spanish language ==
San Millán has a claim to being the birthplace of the Spanish language. This claim is based on its monasteries being the home of a medieval manuscript which contains the Glosas Emilianenses, examples of writing in an early Romance language, a forerunner of Spanish. The claim is reinforced by the proximity of the village to Berceo which is associated with Gonzalo de Berceo, the first Spanish poet known by name.

The area is now Spanish-speaking, but some of the local place-names are of Basque origin, and the Glosas Emilianenses, provides evidence that in medieval times Basque was spoken alongside an early form of Spanish.

== History ==
In a papal bull from 1199 where Privileges were granted to the monasteries of San Millán de la Cogolla it appears with the name Coculla, which comes from the Latin word cuculla, small hill, hilltop; this word is typically used for high sites and those of defensive nature, coming from the times of the Reconquista. The other part of the name is taken from a 6th-century saint (Saint Emilianus or San Millán) who lived here.

In medieval times the monastery had a large estate documented in its cartulary, the Becerro Galicano. It also benefited from being on one of the variants of the Camino de Santiago.

A number of abbots of San Millán de la Cogolla held different episcopal titles between 1025 and 1065

The monastery and the surrounding area suffered in the civil war between Peter of Castile and Henry II of Castile. The war involved a major confrontation nearby, the Battle of Nájera (April 1367). Peter was supported by Edward the Black Prince, who acquired the so-called Black Prince's Ruby (it is not clear how) before returning to England. Peter was killed in 1369 by Henry, who then ascended the throne.

Those affected included the small Jewish community (aljama) of San Millán. In 1369 Henry made an order in their favour, "the Christian men and women and the Moorish men and women" should immediately discharge all their debts to the Jews, "that the last-named might be able to pay their taxes the more promptly." On September 10, 1371, however, the king released the abbot and all the monks of San Millán from whatever debts they had contracted with the Jews since the Battle of Nájera.

== Politics ==
List of mayors since the democratic elections of 1979
Term	Mayor	Political party
1979–1983	Santiago Lerena Alesanco	UCD
1983–1987	Santiago Lerena Alesanco	AP
1987–1991	Millán Ángel Baltanás Lorenzo	PSOE
1991–1995	Millán Ángel Baltanás Lorenzo	PSOE
1995–1999	Eladio Cañas Ureta	PR
1999–2003	Eladio Cañas Ureta	PP
2003–2007	Eladio Cañas Ureta	PP
2007–2011	María Pilar Mendoza Martínez	PSOE
2011–2015	María Pilar Mendoza Martínez	PSOE
2015–2019	Raquel Fernández Tejerina	PP
2019–2023	n/d	n/d
2023–	n/d	n/d

== Notable people ==
- Juan de San Millán
- Antonio Segura
- María de la O Lejárraga
- Leandro Nieto Bolandier
- Joaquín Peña
- Tarsicio Lejárraga

== See also ==
- Aurea of San Millán
- Monasteries of San Millán
