= Becerro Galicano =

The cartulary of the monasteries of San Millán de la Cogolla in Spain survives as a codex called the Becerro Galicano. It contains more than 200 folio sheets, the work of a single scribe active at the end of the 12th century.

The scribe was transcribing earlier documents which are sometimes dated. The dating cannot always be taken at face value: sometimes monasteries used documentary fabrication to reclaim lost prestige. In the case of San Millán de la Cogolla, it has been pointed out that it was in the interests of the monastery to include in the cartulary claims in respect of patrimony associated with episcopal titles which its abbots had held under Navarrese royal patronage.

Becerro is a Spanish term for a monastic cartulary. It is derived from the word for the calf-binding typical of Spanish cartularies (although in this case the binding is goatskin). Galicano refers to Carolingian script, the type of script used. The monastery originally had another cartulary in Gothic script.

== De Ferro de Alaua ==
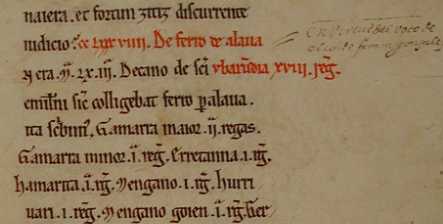
The role of a decano (dean) with regard to the "ferro de Alaua" is mentoned in this folio. Taxes were assessed in terms of iron (for ploughshares)

A section with the Latin title "De Ferro de Alaua" (Basque: Donemiliagako goldea, Spanish: Reja de San Millán) has been dated to the 11th century. Similarly to the way the Domesday Book records mills in Norman England as a way to measure economic output and assign obligations, the cartulary quantifies ploughshares in Álava. It gives detailed information including archaic versions of the names of settlements which paid a tax to the monastery. The tax was nominally collected by a dean, suggesting that it was connected to the Diocese of Álava.

== Linguistic mix ==
It has been said that this supposedly Latin text is "profoundly influenced by early Castilian, to which an abundance of Basque names is added to form a singularly complex linguistic mix".

The toponyms reflect the fact that the monastery held land in Basque-speaking areas and Romance-speaking areas. The Basque toponyms have been studied by scholars researching the phonological past of the Basque language such as Luis Michelena and more recently Juliette Blevins.

== Access and publication ==
The Becerro Galicano has survived in good condition. It is normally kept in the library at Yuso, the lower refoundation of the monastery, having been hidden in the 19th century, a time of ecclesiastical confiscations. In October 2025 it was on loan to the Archives Office of Alava in Vitoria-Gasteiz as the centrepiece of an exhibition celebrating the 1000th anniversary of "De Ferro de Alaua".

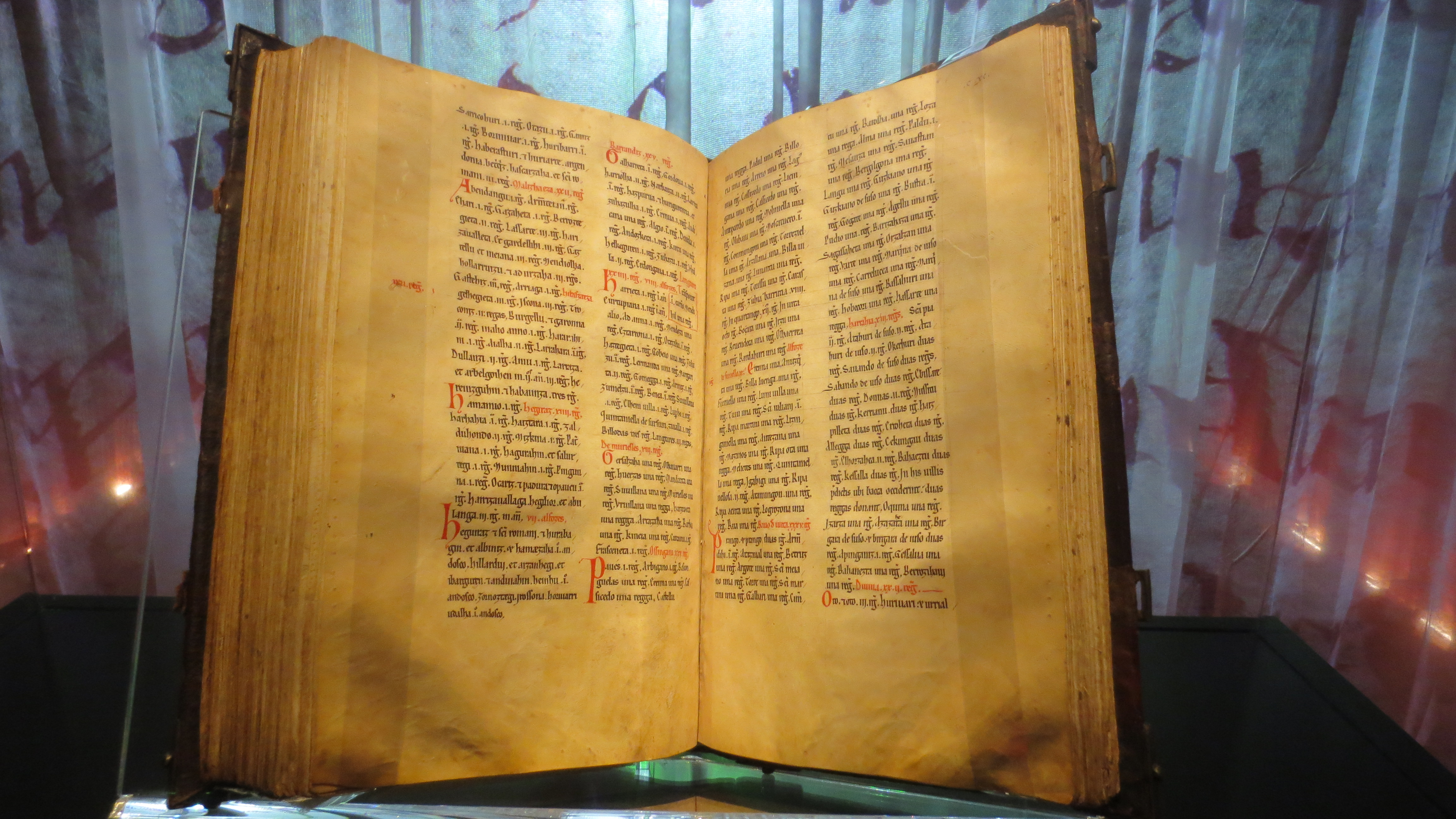
The codex on exhibition

The Becerro Galicano has been published, most recently in a digital edition involving the University of the Basque Country and the Centro Internacional de Investigación de la Lengua Española (a research institute based in San Millán de la Cogolla). It is accessible online at https://www.ehu.es/galicano.

== See also ==
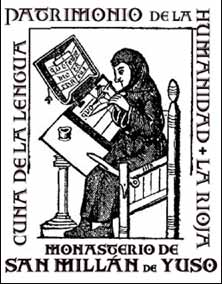

The monastery was also the home of the Glosas Emilianenses, which is another example of a linguistic mix containing early Basque and Romance texts. However, the codex containing the Glosas Emilianenses was removed to Madrid in the 19th century.
