= Monasteries of San Millán de la Cogolla =

San Millán Yuso and Suso Monasteries
UNESCO World Heritage Site
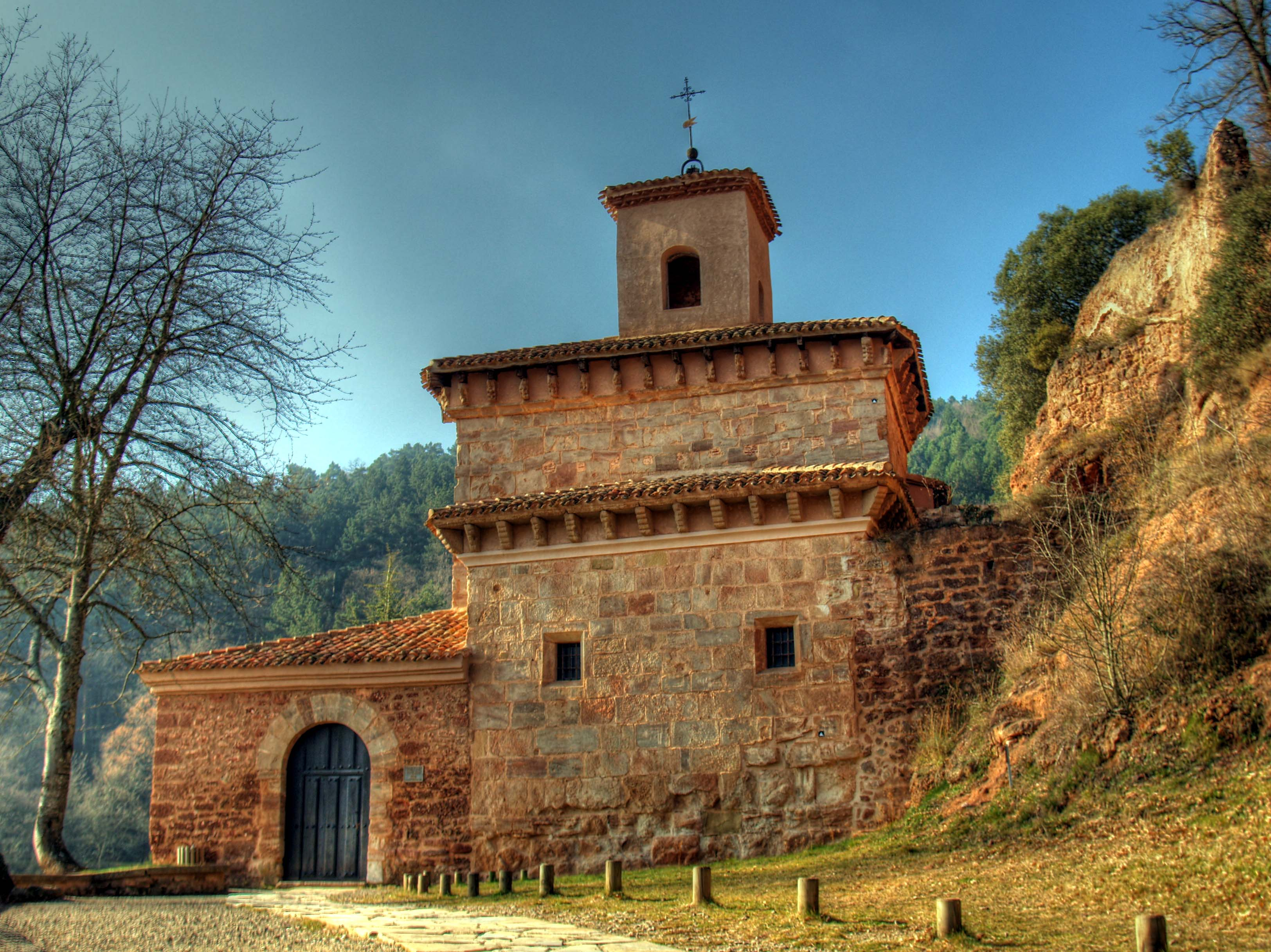
- San Millán de Suso

- Location within La Rioja, Spain Location within Spain
- Location: San Millán de la Cogolla, La Rioja, Spain
- Includes: 1. Yuso Monastery and Monastic Kitchen Gardens; 2. Suso Monastery and Archaeological Sites
- Criteria: Cultural: (ii), (iv), (vi)
- Reference: 805
- Inscription: 1997 (21st Session)
- Area: 19.01 ha (47.0 acres)
- Buffer zone: 266.24 ha (657.9 acres)
- Website: www.monasteriodesanmillan.com
- Coordinates: 42°19′33″N 2°51′54″W

Spanish Cultural Heritage
- Official name: Monasterios de Yuso y Suso
- Type: Real property
- Criteria: Monument

The monasteries of San Millán de Suso (6th century) and San Millán de Yuso (16th century) are two monasteries situated in the village of San Millán de la Cogolla, La Rioja, Spain. They have been designated a World Heritage Site by UNESCO since December 1997.

The two monasteries' names Suso and Yuso mean the "upper" and the "lower" in archaic Castilian, respectively. Suso is the older building and is believed to be built on the site of a hermitage where Saint Emilian (Spanish: San Millán) lived. Perhaps Suso's major claim to fame is as the place where phrases in the Spanish and Basque languages were written for the first time. UNESCO acknowledges the property "as the birthplace of the modern written and spoken Spanish language". The phrases in Spanish and Basque are glosses on a Latin text and are known as the Glosas Emilianenses. There is some debate as to whether the Spanish words are written in an early form of Castilian (Spanish), or in a similar early form of Navarro-Aragonese (ancestor to modern Aragonese). In either case, San Millán's importance as a cradle of the Spanish language is reinforced by the proximity of the village of Berceo which is associated with Gonzalo de Berceo, the first Spanish poet known by name.

== History ==
There is a continuous history of Christianity at San Millán since the time of the saint. The scriptorium produced the second phase of the San Millán Beatus and remained active during the period of Muslim rule; and over the centuries, the religious community has overcome various vicissitudes which affected the monasteries (for example being sacked by the Black Prince). However the type of monastic life evolved: the original monks living at Suso were hermits, but Yuso, the refoundation of the monastery on a lower site, developed as a Benedictine community. As the UNESCO evaluation noted, San Millán shows the transformation from an eremitic to a cenobitic community in material terms.

Suso monastery has been uninhabited since the expropriation of monastic property in the 19th century. Such expropriations were widespread in Spain, and are often called the ecclesiastical confiscations of Mendizábal, but at San Millan the process began in the 1820s during the Trienio Liberal, a decade before the government of Juan Álvarez Mendizábal. Yuso monastery was abandoned at the same time, but was reoccupied by an Augustinian community.

== The monasteries today ==
Today part of the monastery has been converted into a hotel. San Millán attracts pilgrims on the Way of St James (even though it lies somewhat off the line of the official route between Nájera and Burgos).

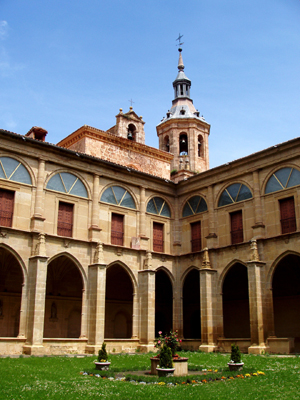
Processional cloister. Yuso Monastery.

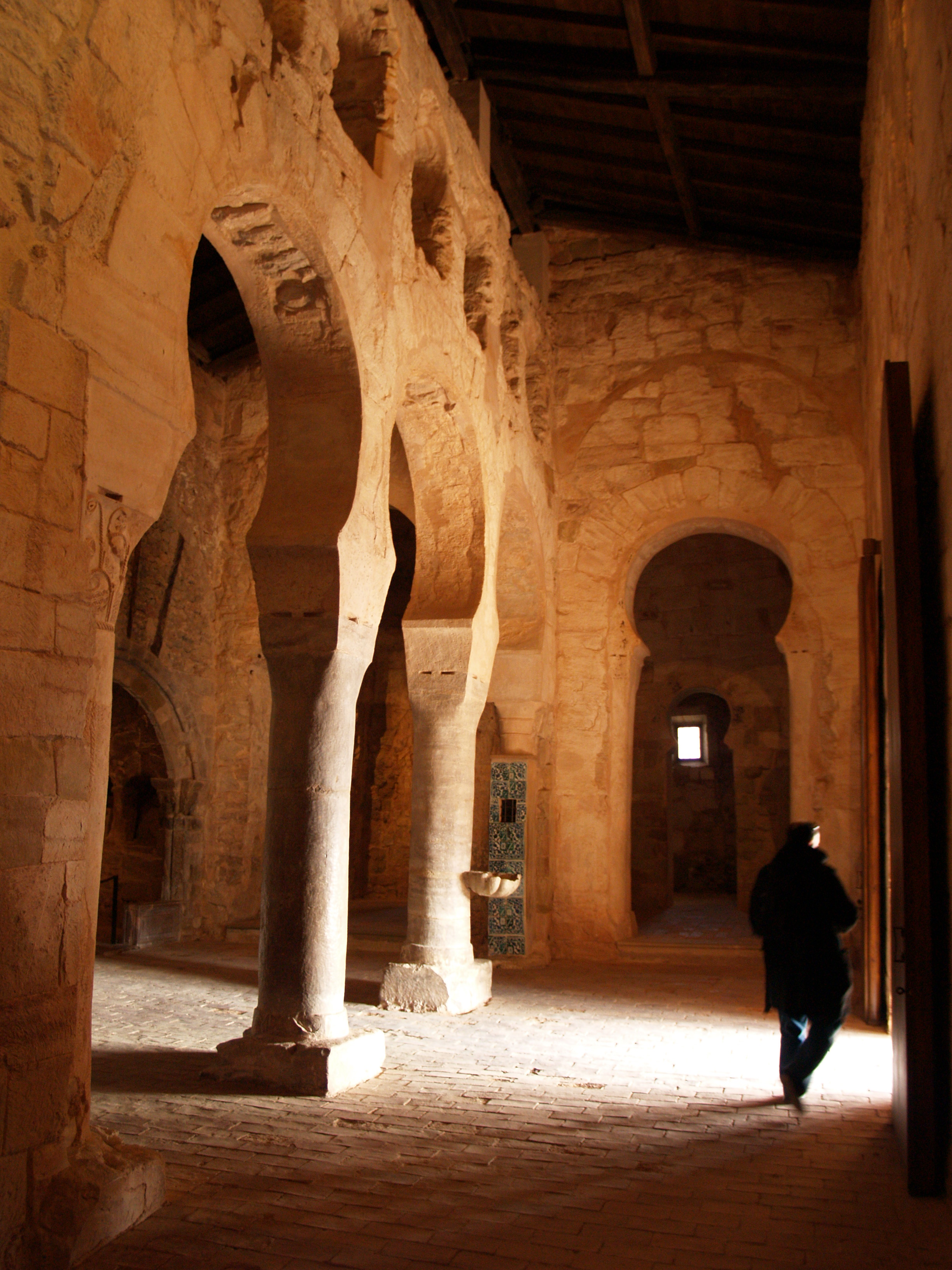
Mozarabic arches in the Suso Monastery.

== See also ==
- Sonsierra
