= Valencian Aragonese =

Extinct language spoken in Valencia

- Native to: Eastern Spain
- Region: Central Valencia
- Extinct: 15th century
- Language family: Indo-European: Italic; Latino-Faliscan; Latinic; Romance; Italo-Western; Western Romance; (disputed); Pyrenean–Mozarabic?; Navarro-Aragonese; Valencian Aragonese
- Early forms: Old Latin: Vulgar Latin; Proto-Romance; (unclassified); Navarro-Aragonese
- Writing system: Latin

Language codes
- ISO 639-3: None (mis)
- Glottolog: None
- Valencian Aragonese

Valencian Aragonese are the extinct varieties of Navarro-Aragonese which are supposed to have been spoken in the Kingdom of Valencia until the 15th century. It was one of six dialects of Navarro-Aragonese and one of four dialects of medieval Aragonese. The areas in which the settlers greatly influenced are referred to as the comarcas churras.

Aragonese had been spoken in Valencia in the 13th century, after migrations by Aragonese settlers under James I.

== History ==
In the 13th century, under the reign of James I, many Aragonese settlers moved to areas within the Kingdom of Valencia. These settlers mostly migrated to the province of Castellón, though other areas also went through Aragonese influence. The comarcas (shires) which underwent Aragonese influence (dubbed the comarcas churras) are Alto Mijares, Alto Palancia, Los Serranos, Rincón de Ademuz, and Hoya de Buñol. All of these areas apart from Hoya de Buñol border the province of Teruel.

In 1479, the crowns of Castile and Aragon united as a result of the marriage of Isabella I of Castile and Ferdinand II of Aragon. This resulted in Castilian growing in prestige in the Kingdom of Valencia. By the late 15th century, the comarcas churras had shifted to Castilian. This variety of Castilian had not only an Aragonese substrate but also influence from nearby Valencian.

== Influence ==
One theory for the origin of the term "churro" is that the Aragonese settlers couldn't pronounce yo juro ("I swear") correctly, pronouncing juro as churro.
