= Eslava =

Coordinates: 42°34′N 1°27′W

- Town
- Eslava, Spain
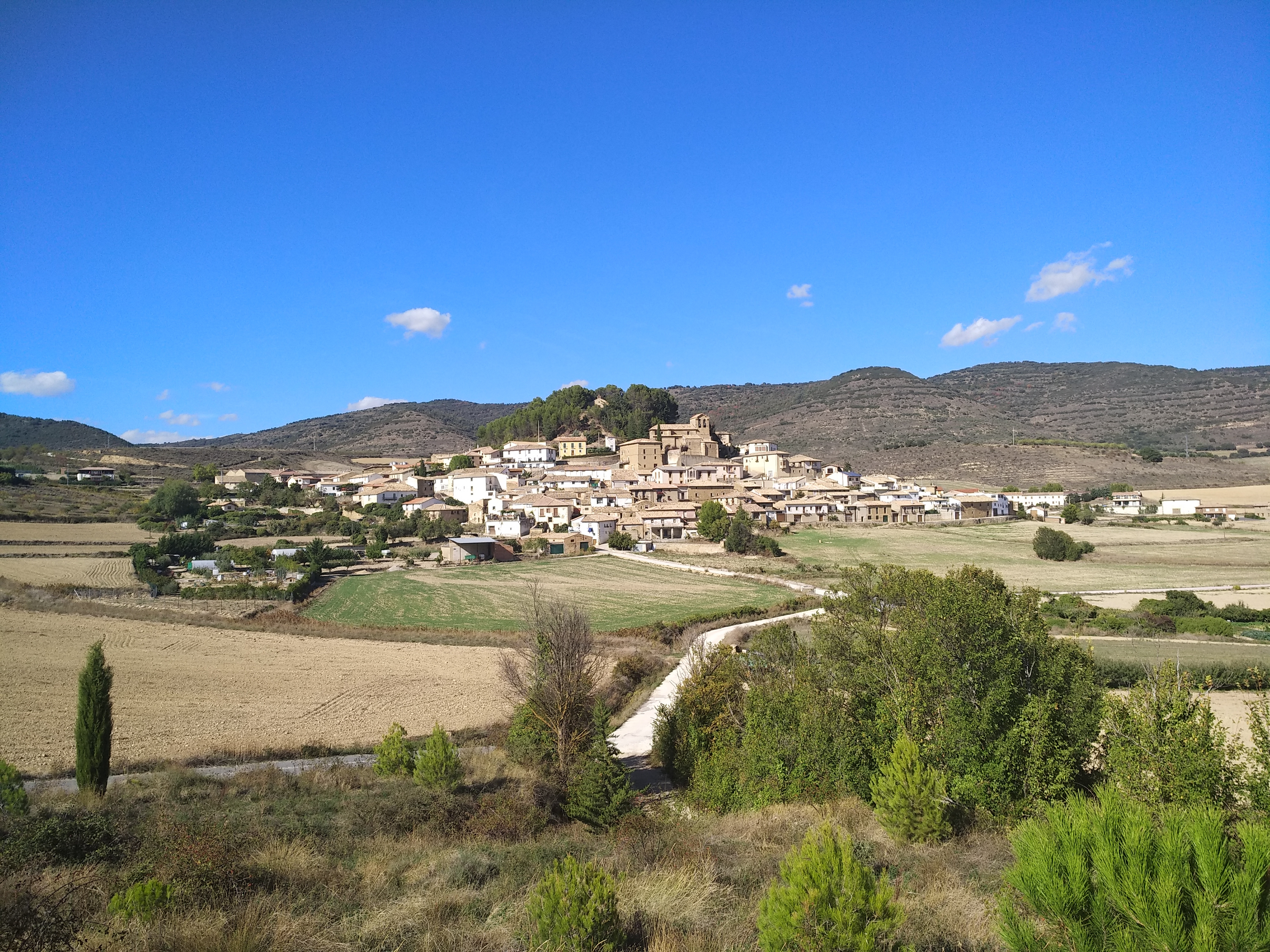
- Town of Eslava

- Coat of arms

- Map of Eslava, Navarra

Eslava is a town and municipality located in the province and autonomous community of Navarre, northern Spain.
