= Crónica of Pedro de Valencia =

The Crónica of Pedro de Valencia is a Spanish chronicle of the Kingdom of Navarre from 994 to around 1560. It was composed in stages at the monastery of Santa María la Real of Nájera. The original chronicle concerned primarily the foundation of the monastery by King García Sánchez III (1035–1054) and this is the largest part of the whole. The chronicle only reached its final form in 1564–1576, when Pedro de Valencia, a monk of Santa María la Real, redacted the whole and brought it down to his time.

== Synopsis ==
The language of the Crónica is Spanish. It contains 46 chapters, although the numbering begins with chapter 12. It can be divided into three sections based on style and authorship, chapters 12–38, 41–50 and 51–57. The first section takes up 83% of the work and just the reign of García Sánchez III takes up almost half (46.5%). The focus of the first section is the foundation and endowment of Santa María la Real of Nájera.

The Crónica consists of 27 chapters of unequal length each devoted to the reign of a single king of Navarre plus 18 chapters devoted to the reign of García Sánchez III alone and a single chapter, placed at the end, on Blanche of Navarre, the queen of Sancho III of Castile. It covers the period from 994 to about 1560. Its succession is as follows:

- García Sánchez II el Tembloso
- Sancho III el Mayor
- García Sánchez III
- Sancho IV
- Sancho Garcés
- Sancho V
- Peter I
- Alfonso I
- García Ramírez
- Sancho VI el Valiente
- Sancho VII el Encerrado
- Theobald I
- Theobald II
- Henry I
- Philip I Lobel
- Louis I
- Philip II el Luengo
- Charles I
- Philip III
- Charles II
- Charles III
- John II
- Gaston
- Francis Phoebus
- John III de Labrid
- Ferdinand
- Charles V

The value of the Crónica as a historical source of information is low. It contains many legends. It also includes many inaccuracies of chronology and genealogy. It confuses García Sánchez II with García Sánchez I. It claims that Sancho Garcés was declared king between Sancho IV and Sancho V. It has Gaston IV, Count of Foix, outliving John II and becoming king of Navarre when in fact he predeceased him and never inherited. It is more interested in heraldry than chronology.

== Authorship and dating ==
The Crónica appears to be the successive work of three authors working centuries apart. The anonymous author of chapters 12–38 covered the reigns of García Sánchez II through García Ramírez. On three occasions, he writes in the first person. The second author continued the work for the reigns of Sancho VI through Charles III. His style is more annalistic and lacks the legendary and moralizing components of his predecessor's. He was writing in 1412–1413, since he refers to Prince Lionel as the marshal of Navarre at the time. He was probably a monk of Santa María la Real of Nájera. The third author and final redactor of the work was working when Maximilian II was king of Hungary, between 1564 and 1576. He brought the chronicle down to the reign of Charles V. He may be the Pedro de Valencia (or Pedro Valencia) who was the prior of Nájera in 1535–1538. All surviving copies of the Crónica name its author in this way: Su autor, F. Pedro Valencia, monge en Nágera, año de 1400, which seems combine the name of the final redaction with the date of the second redaction. Pedro de Valencia is responsible for the final form of the Crónica as it stands, having edited the earlier parts using later sources.

== Sources ==
In only four instances does the Crónica cite its source. The five cited sources are Charles, Prince of Viana, Sigebert of Gembloux, García de Eugui, Rodrigo Jiménez de Rada and Lucas de Tuy. Other sources used include Garci López de Roncesvalles, the Chronica Naierensis and the Chronicle of San Juan de la Peña in both its Latin and Aragonese versions. Material not derived from these sources may be based on oral tradition.

== Manuscripts ==
There are four surviving manuscripts of the Crónica, all late copies. They have been assigned letters (sigla) by the text's modern editor, Agustín Ubieto Arteta:

- B – Madrid, Real Academia de la Historia, MS 9/5555 (olim C–134), copied in 1788
- C – Madrid, Real Academia de la Historia, MS 9/5238 (olim B–154), copied in the 19th century from B
- D – Pamplona, Biblioteca General de Navarra, MS 36–6/32, copied in 1770
- E – Pamplona, Archivo Real y General de Navarra, no shelfmark, copied in the 18th century from D

== Bibliography ==
- Sánchez Alonso, B. (1947). Historia de la historiografía española. Vol. 1: Hasta la publicación de la crónica de Ocampo (...–1543) (2nd ed.). Madrid.
- Ubieto Arteta, Agustín, ed. (1991). Pedro de Valencia: Crónica (PDF). Zaragoza.
- Ward, Aengus (1999). "Kingdom of Navarre in Early Peninsular Historiography". In Don W. Cruickshank (ed.). A Lifetime's Reading: Hispanic Essays for Patrick Gallagher. University College Dublin Press. pp. 191–202.
