= García de Eugui =

García de Eugui (died 1408) was a Navarrese clergyman, diplomat and historian. He was the confessor of two successive kings, Charles II and Charles III, from 1375 until 1407. In this capacity he was entrusted with many diplomatic missions. An adherent of the Avignon Papacy during the Great Schism, he served that cause as the bishop of Bayonne in exile from 1384.

He wrote a history of Spain entitled Crónica d'Espayña.

== Life ==
On 28 December 1359, García received from the infante Louis a scholarship to study in Castile. He was at that time already a member of the Order of Saint Augustine. He had completed his education by 1370, when he was prior and lecturer in theology of the Augustinian house in Pamplona.

In 1375, Eugui succeeded Pierre de Saint-Martin as the confessor of Charles II. He was the first native of Navarre to hold this position under the House of Évreux. He was with Charles in Normandy in 1378, when Charles dispatched him to Navarre with a message for the queen. On 26 June 1378, he delivered 20,000 Aragonese florins to Pedro Manrique, Castilian governor of Logroño, who was to hand over his castle to Navarre. In fact, Manrique was attempting to capture Charles II. The result of these failed gambits was war between Castile and Navarre. Nevertheless, Eugui undertook several diplomatic missions to Castile between 1381 and 1385.

In 1382, following the death of Bishop Barthélémy de La Rivière, Charles II sought the see of Bayonne for Eugui. Pedro de Zumálaga was elected instead, but died soon after. On 12 February 1384, the Avignon pope Clement VII appointed Eugui bishop. As Gascony was under English rule and the English did not recognize the Avignon pope, Eugui was unable to enter Bayonne. He therefore resided in Saint-Jean-Pied-de-Port and governed what part of his diocese he could.

Eugui was present at the signing of the Treaty of Estella on 1 January 1386, which restored territories Navarre had lost in the 1378–1379 war. When Charles II died a year later, he was the executor of his will. He also served as alférez for the three weeks it took Charles III to arrive in Navarre after his father's death. In 1388, he travelled to Castile. He attended Charles III's coronation in Pamplona on 13 February 1390.

On 3 December 1405 in Olite, Eugui officiated the marriage of Charles's heiress, Joan, and the heir of the county of Foix, John. He continued as confessor to Charles III until March 1407. He was succeeded by Diego de Dicastillo later that year. He died in 1408.

== Works ==
Eugui wrote a history of Spain entitled Crónica d'Espayña. It has twice been printed in modern times. Scholars are divided over whether Eugui wrote mainly in the 1360s or 1390s. There are nine surviving manuscripts of the Crónica. Its language is Navarrese Romance with Castilian characteristics.

The Crónica consists of two distinct parts, the history of Spain which takes up 130 folios in the earliest manuscript and a genealogy of the kings of Navarre, which takes up a further eight folios. In a brief opening statement, Eugui identifies himself and describes his work as being about the deeds done in Spain in the past according to old books. He refers to his work as canonicas, perhaps as 'canons' on which to base a more detailed exposition. The Crónica begins with Creation and ends with the death of Charles II in 1387, although the last years of his reign are not covered. It dates events by the Spanish era.

Eugui's main sources are Rodrigo Jiménez de Rada's De rebus Hispaniae and the Alfonsine Estoria de España. He supplements these for the earlier period with Isidore of Seville's Historia Gothorum and Orosius' History Against the Pagans. For the Roman period, he condenses his source material into a series of chapters on each reign, limiting himself to military, Christian and Spanish events. For later periods, he selectively highlights Navarrese material without turning the chronicle into a history of Navarre. The genealogy at the end recapitulates the reign of Sancho the Great and the Battle of Las Navas de Tolosa, the two outstanding moments in Navarrese history. It gives a genealogy from Íñigo Arista to Charles II.

The Crónica was used as a source by Charles, Prince of Viana, and by Pedro de Valencia.
