= Old Riojan =

Extinct variety of Navarro-Aragonese of medieval La Rioja

- romanz
- Native to: Spain
- Region: Northeastern medieval La Rioja
- Era: 10th–13th centuries
- Language family: Indo-European: Italic; Latino-Faliscan; Latinic; Romance; Italo-Western; Western Romance; (disputed); Pyrenean–Mozarabic?; Navarro-Aragonese; Old Riojan
- Early forms: Old Latin: Vulgar Latin; Proto-Romance; (unclassified); Navarro-Aragonese
- Writing system: Latin

Language codes
- ISO 639-3: None (mis)
- Glottolog: None
- Old Riojan

Old Riojan is an extinct variety of Navarro-Aragonese which was spoken in northeastern medieval La Rioja. This variety went extinct due to a rapid mixture with Castilian following La Rioja falling into the control of Crown of Castile.

Latin had been spoken in La Rioja after 218 BC, following the Second Punic War. These varieties eventually evolved into Old Riojan, and were first documented in the Glosas Emilianenses. In the modern day, the modern Riojan varieties of Castilian contain several characteristics which belonged to Old Riojan.

== Classification and terminology ==
The term "Old Riojan" refers to varieties of Navarro-Aragonese spoken in La Rioja.

Varieties of Ibero-Romance were referred as "romanz" before the reign of Alfonso X of Castile in the 13th century. Terms such as castellano, leonés, and riojano only existed as adjectives relating as to the region it referred to, but not as names of languages or dialects. As a Romance language, it formed part of a linguistic continuum, where it and Navarrese were both in-between Aragonese and Castilian.

== History ==
=== Pre-Riojan era ===
Before Roman times, the Vascones inhabited northeastern La Rioja. They presumably spoke a precursor to modern Basque. It is believed by experts that the Hand of Irulegi is written in this Vasconic language, referred as "proto-Basque". Upon the arrival of Romans in 218 BC following the Second Punic War, Latin was brought the Iberian Peninsula, initially to the southern and eastern coasts. These Latin varieties eventually evolved into multiple Vulgar Latin dialects, La Riojan being one of them.

In 711 AD, the Iberian Peninsula fell into Muslim control, and La Rioja became a part of the Muslim domains of Al-Andalus. This resulted in an influx of Arabic vocabulary being added to everyday Ibero-Romance speech, most words starting with "al-" or "a".

=== 10th-12th centuries ===
The first features in Ibero-Romance arise in the 10th century as fragments appear from that time in Vulgar Latin varieties, identifiable as Old Leonese and Navarro-Aragonese. In the 10th or 11th century, glosses known as the "Glosas Emilianenses" were written, presumably by a monk at the monastery of San Millán de Suso (in La Rioja). These glosses were originally believed to be written in Castilian, though it several authors now believe they are the first written texts in Navarro-Aragonese.

=== Decline and extinction ===
Starting from the 12th century, La Rioja started to be more Castilianized following the region's annexation by the Crown of Castile. By the 13th century, all characteristics which marked the Riojan dialect disappeared in the west, while in the east, these characteristics mingled with Burgalese Castilian. Currently, several characteristics are conserved in the modern Riojan dialect.
