= Navarro-Aragonese =

Romance language spoken in northeast Iberia

- Native to: Kingdom of Navarre; Kingdom of Aragon; Kingdom of Valencia
- Region: Northeast Iberia
- Extinct: 17th century developed into Aragonese
- Language family: Indo-European: Italic; Latino-Faliscan; Latin; Romance; Italo-Western; Western Romance; (disputed); Pyrenean–Mozarabic?; Navarro-Aragonese
- Dialects: Community of Villages Aragonese; Ebro Valley Aragonese; Medieval High Aragonese; Navarrese Romance; Old Riojan; Valencian Aragonese

Language codes
- ISO 639-3: None (mis)
- Glottolog: None

Navarro-Aragonese was a Romance language once spoken in a large part of the Ebro River basin, south of the middle Pyrenees; the dialects of the modern Aragonese language, spoken in a small portion of that territory, can be seen as its last remaining forms. The areas where Navarro-Aragonese was spoken might have included most of Aragon, southern Navarre, and La Rioja. It was also spoken across several towns of central Navarre in a multilingual environment with Occitan, where Basque was the native language.

Navarro-Aragonese gradually lost ground throughout most of its geographic area to Castilian (i.e. Spanish), with its last remnants being the dialects of the Aragonese language still spoken in northern Aragon.

== Dialects ==
Map of Navarro-Aragonese dialects: Community of Villages Aragonese Ebro Valley Aragonese Medieval High Aragonese Navarrese Romance Old Riojan Valencian Aragonese

Navarro-Aragonese has 6 different dialects:

- Community of Villages Aragonese
- Ebro Valley Aragonese
- Medieval High Aragonese
- Navarrese Romance
- Old Riojan
- Valencian Aragonese

The only surviving dialect is Medieval High Aragonese, with it evolving into Aragonese.

== Origins and distribution ==
Navarro-Aragonese was not defined by clear-cut boundaries, but was rather a Romance language continuum spoken in the area extending north of the Muslim realms of the Ebro, under the influence of Mozarabic and Basque, towards the Pyrenees. The Muwallad Banu Qasi, lords of Tudela in the 9th century, may have mostly spoken a variant of Navarro-Aragonese. Early evidence of the language can be found in place-names like Murillo el Fruto attested as Murello Freito and Muriel Freito (stemming from Latin Murellus Fractus), and Cascante, Olite or Urzante with a typical restored -e ending after t in this area.

Navarro-Aragonese is also attested in major towns of Navarre (including Estella and Pamplona) in a multilingual environment where Basque was the natural language, used by most of the people; Occitan was spoken by the Franks in their ethnic boroughs; and Hebrew was used for written purposes in the aljamas along with Basque and Navarro-Aragonese as vernaculars in their respective linguistic regions.

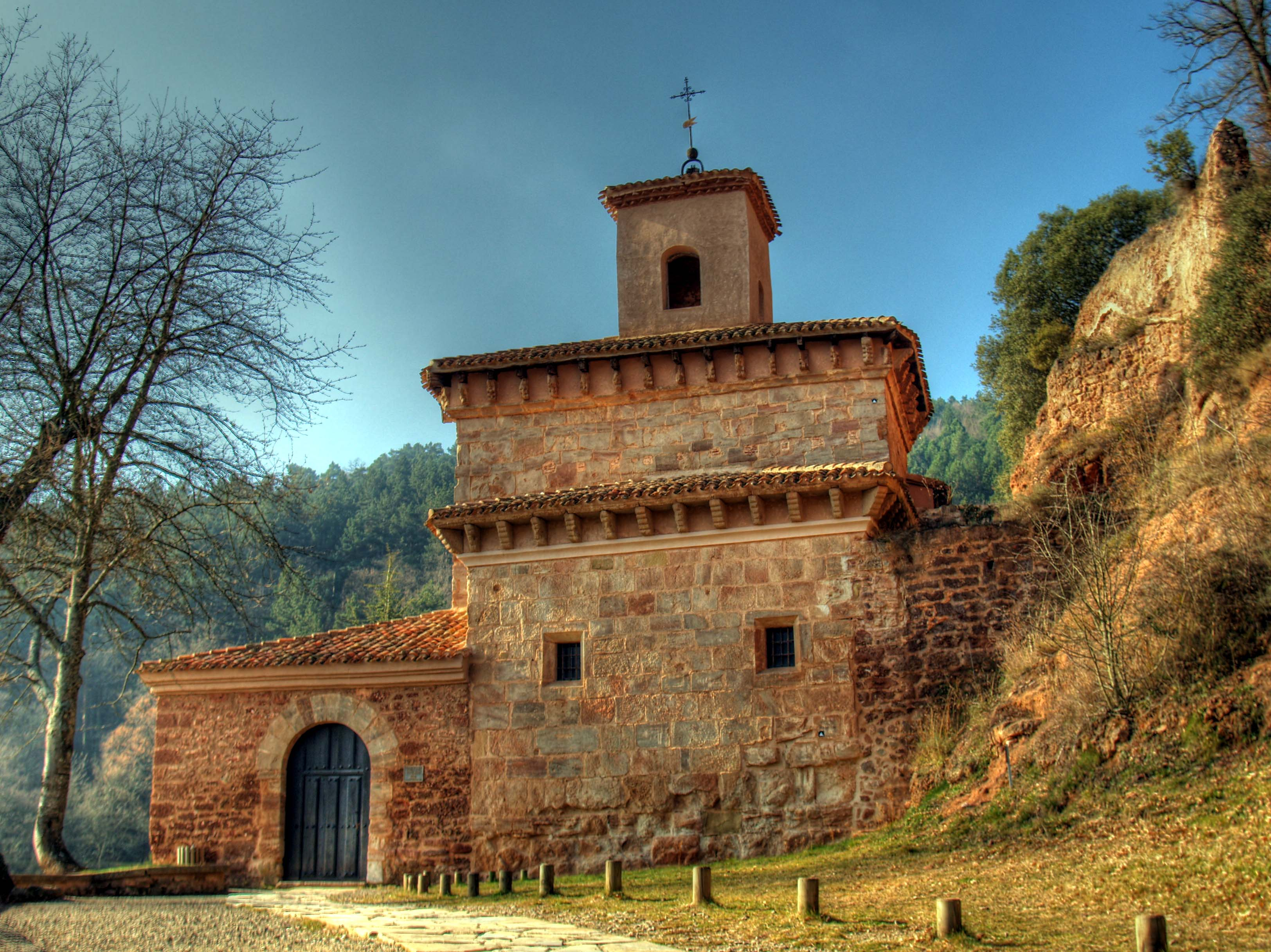
The Monastery of San Millan de la Cogolla in La Rioja is home to the oldest records in Navarro-Aragonese

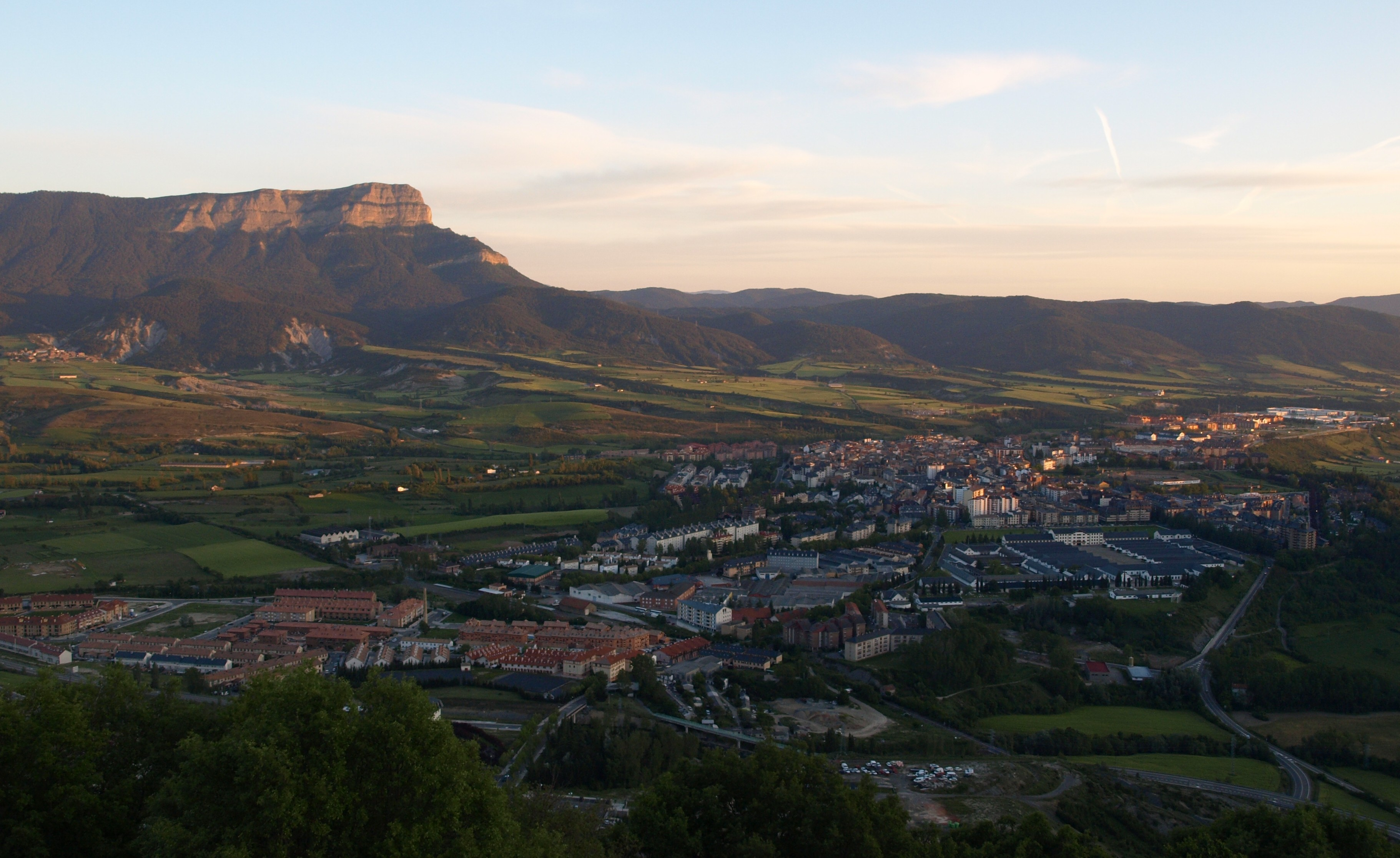
Jaca in the Corridor of Berdún

At the westernmost tip of this middle Ebro stretch, a Romance variant was developed in La Rioja, recorded in the Glosas Emilianenses dating from roughly 1000 AD. They have been diversely classified from "cradle of Spanish" to a Navarro-Aragonese variant, while it is widely accepted that the glosses show more similarities with the latter. However, political events would tip the scale in favour of an increasing assimilation to Spanish in the following centuries, especially after the disputed region was annexed to Castile in 1177 at the expense of Navarre. Another focal point for the emergence and expansion of Romance in High Aragon and the eastern border of Navarre was the ancient Roman road and Way of St. James crossing the Pyrenees to the south from Gascony and extending west via Jaca through the Corridor of Berdún, while the territory was largely Basque-Romance bilingual in 1349.

However, early Navarro-Aragonese–speaking communities may have ebbed and become assimilated in some spots on the strength of a predominant Basque-speaking population (overwhelmingly so in Navarre) north away from the Ebro plains, due to demographic, economic and political shifts; e.g. the eastern borders of Navarre in Leire, Sangüesa, Liédena, and Romanzado altogether, were densely Basque-speaking in the mid and late 16th century. Navarro-Aragonese had a strong Basque substratum and adstratum, the former being in close contact with Basque, which in turn was rapidly losing ground to the Romance language in the Kingdom of Aragon during the High and Late Middle Ages.

== Status and written language ==
Navarro-Aragonese was chosen in the High Middle Ages by the Navarrese aristocracy and royal institutions for official records and documents in the 14th century, when Occitan variants fell into disuse after the last devastating war among boroughs in Pamplona; it was dubbed ydiomate navarre terrae or lengoage de Navarra (as opposed to the lingua navarrorum, the Basque language). "Navarro-Aragonese" is a modern term coined for linguistic classification purposes, while its speakers may have referred to it as "Romanz(e) (Aragonés/Navarro)" in the Middle Ages.

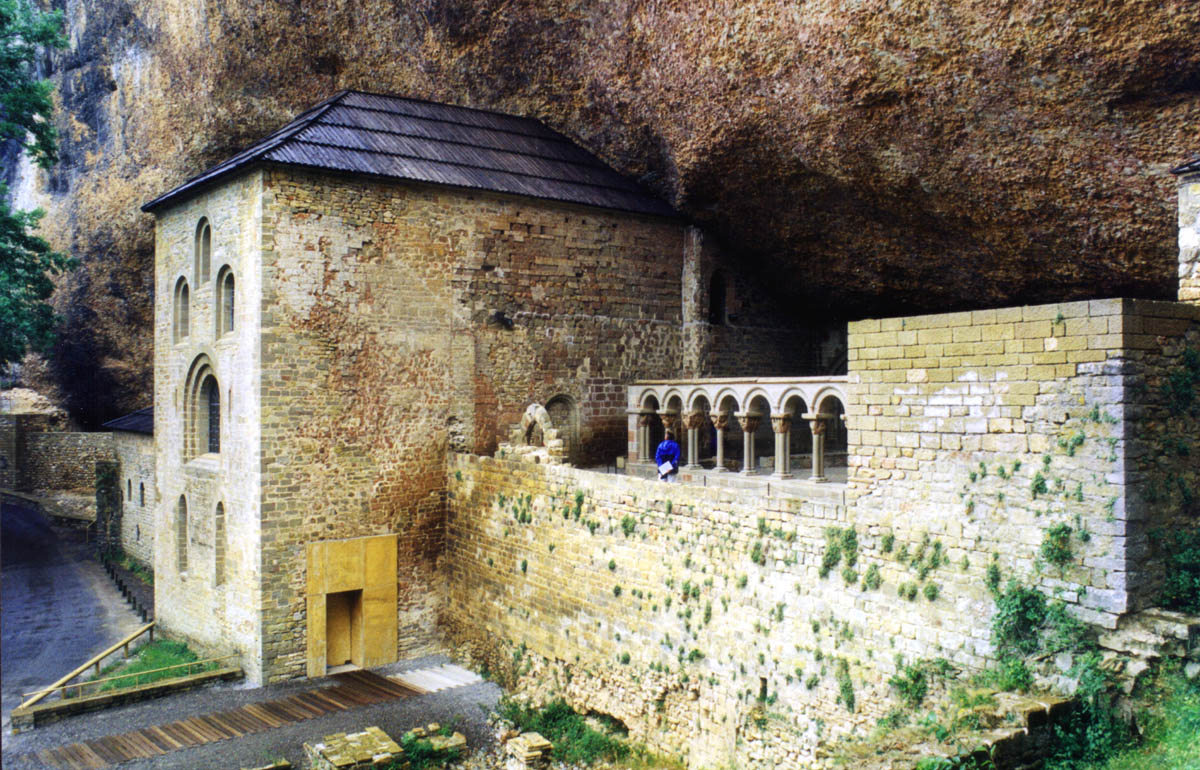
San Juan de la Peña, a landmark in the expansion of Romance in Aragón

The features of the language at this last stage in the 14th and 15th centuries grew closer to those of Castilian, showing a clear trend towards convergence, as attested in the telling opening sentence of Charles II of Navarre at his coronation ceremony (1350): "Nos Karlos, por la gracia de Dios, rey de Navarra et conté d'Evreux, juramos a nuestro pueblo de Navarra, es assaber, prelados, ricoshombres, cavailleros, hombres de buenas villas et a todo el pueblo de Navarra, todos lures fueros, usos, costumbres, franquezas, libertades."

== Eventual development ==
In Navarre the language gradually merged with Castilian (Spanish) in the 15th and early 16th centuries, but it survived in Aragon, eventually developing into Aragonese, expanding south along with the Crown of Aragon's lands conquered to the kingdoms in Al-Andalus, and reaching at one point as far south as Murcia, while the Mediterranean coastal strip came to be settled by Catalan speakers. These geo-linguistic gains could not prevent Navarro-Aragonese from gradually losing ground to Spanish both territorially and socially after the Trastámara dynasty's access to the Aragonese crown and the 1469 wedding between Ferdinand II of Aragon and Isabella I of Castile, who favoured Spanish in the royal court. However, some varieties of the language, now called Aragonese, have survived in northern Aragon as a vernacular, though increasingly confined to the higher Pyrenees.

== Vocabulary ==
The vocabulary below illustrates the language's Romance roots, its relationship to neighbouring languages (adstratum, and possibly also as substratum in the case of Basque), as well as meanings in English.

Navarro-Aragonese	Béarnese (Occitan)	Spanish	Catalan	Basque	English
ome	òmi	hombre	home	gizon	man
muyller/muger	hemna, dauna	mujer	muller, dona	emazte, emakume	woman
casa	ostau/casa/maison	casa	casa	etxe	house
arb/arbor	arbe/arbo	arbol	arbre	zuhaitz, arbola	tree
aquest(i)	aqueste	este	aquest	hau	this
areyto	dret	derecho, de pie	dret, dempeus	zuzen, tente, zutik	straight, standing
car/quar	per' mor, pr'amor	porque	perquè	-lako, -gatik, (...) bait, zeren	because
canba	camba	pierna	cama	hanka, zango	leg
cayll	carrera	calle	carrer	kale, karrika	street
cuylir	préner, gahar	coger	collir, prendre	hartu	take (collect)
dreytos	drets	derechos	drets	eskubideak	rights
exir/ixir	sortir, eishir, gessir, salhir	salir	sortir, eixir	irten/jalgi/elk(h)i	exit, get out
faya	destrau	hacha	destral	aizkora	axe
feyto	hèit	hecho	fet	egina	done/made
ferme	hidança	fianza	fiança	berme	deposit
huey	uei	hoy	avui	gaur	today
lueyn	luenh	lejos	lluny	urrun, urruti	far
lur/lures	lor/lors; lo son/los sons; eth son/eths sons	su/sus	llur/llurs; llura/llures; els seus/les seves	haien, beren	their
miyor/migor	miélher/melhor	mejor	millor	hobe	better
Nadal	Nadau	Navidad	Nadal	Eguberri	Christmas
noch/nueyt	nueit	noche	nit	gau	night
pluvia	ploja	lluvia	pluja	euri	rain
poçon/pozon	bevuda/beguda	bebida	beguda	edari	drink
remanir	demorar	permanecer	romandre	gelditu	remain
seteno	setau	séptimo	setè	zazpigarren	seventh
soz/soç	devath, jus	bajo	sota	-ren pean/azpian	under/below
veyendo	vedent	viendo	veient	ikusten	seeing

== Ebro Valley Aragonese ==
Ebro Valley Aragonese
- Native to: Northern Spain
- Region: Ebro Valley
- Extinct: 16th–17th centuries
- Language family: Indo-European: Italic; Latino-Faliscan; Latinic; Romance; Italo-Western; Western Romance; (disputed); Pyrenean–Mozarabic?; Navarro-Aragonese; Ebro Valley Aragonese
- Early forms: Old Latin: Vulgar Latin; Proto-Romance; (unclassified); Navarro-Aragonese
- Writing system: Latin

Language codes
- ISO 639-3: None (mis)
- Glottolog: None
- Ebro Valley Aragonese

Ebro Valley Aragonese was the dialect of Navarro-Aragonese spoken in the Ebro Valley until the 16th–17th centuries when speakers underwent a process of language replacement, which made Castilian the spoken language in the Ebro Valley.

== See also ==
- Aragonese language
- Navarrese Romance
- History of the Basque language
