= Medieval Spanish literature =

Corpus of literary works in Old Spanish

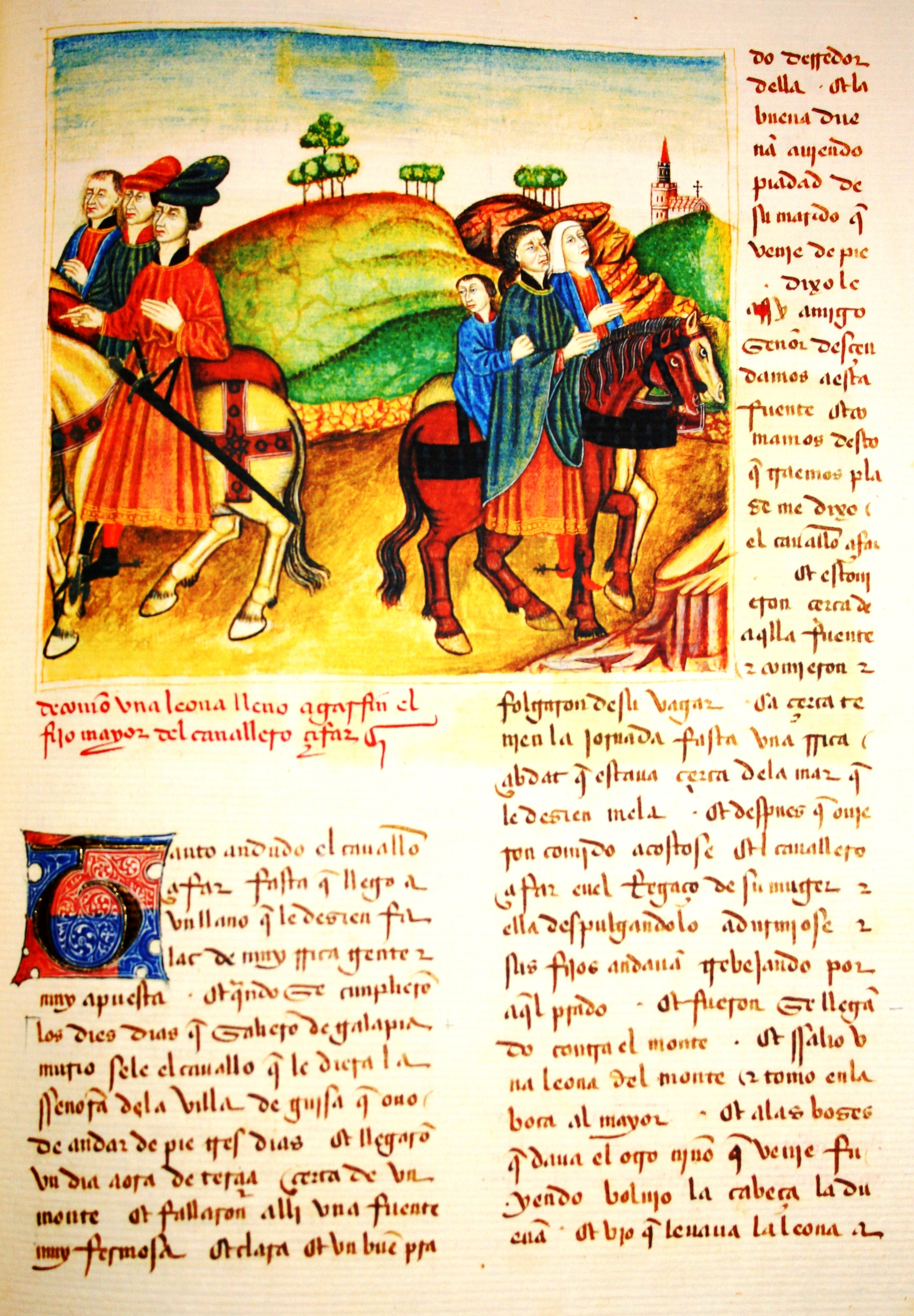
Book of the Knight Zifar, f. 32r Paris. «De cómmo una leona llevó a Garfín, el fijo mayor del cavallero Zifar»

Medieval Spanish literature consists of the corpus of literary works written in Old Spanish between the beginning of the 13th and the end of the 15th century. Traditionally, the first and last works of this period are taken to be respectively the Cantar de mio Cid, an epic poem written at some point between 1140-1207, and La Celestina (1499), a work commonly described as transitional between the Middle Ages and the Renaissance.

By the end of the 10th century, the languages spoken in the Iberian Peninsula had developed far from their Latin origins, and can assuredly be called Romance languages. Latin texts were no longer understood, as can be seen from the glosses used in manuscripts of Castile to explain Latin terms.

Spanish oral literature was doubtless in existence before Spanish texts were written. This is shown by the fact that different authors in the second half of the 11th century could include, at the end of poems written in Arabic or Hebrew, closing verses that, in many cases, were examples of traditional lyric in a Romance language, often Andalusi Romance. These final refrains are known as kharjas (jarchas in Spanish).

== Spanish prose ==
Spanish prose gained popularity in the mid-thirteenth century when Alfonso X of Castile gave support and recognition to the writing form. He, with the help of his groups of intellectuals, directed the composition of many prose works including Las siete partidas, the first modern book of laws of the land written in the people's language. Another work was Estoria de España, which accounted for the history of Spain from the Creation until the end of the reign of his father, San Fernando. For his direction of these works and many others he directed, Alfonso X is called the father of Spanish prose. His nephew, Juan Manuel, Prince of Villena, is famous for his prose work Tales of Count Lucanor, which is a frame story: short stories within an overall story. In this work, the Conde Lucanor seeks advice from his wise counselor, Patronio, who advises by telling of stories. Juan Manuel also wrote lesser-known works such as El libro de los estados on the social classes and El libro del caballero y escudero on philosophical discussions.

Toward the end of the Middle Ages, writer Hernando del Pulgar (1436 – c.1490) created a new type of prose named the verbal portrait. This form is demonstrated by Pulgar's work Claros varones de Castilla in which he represents the detailed lives of twenty-four distinguished contemporaries. He explores their moral and psychological natures as well as physical traits. Pulgar was the official historian of Fernando and Isabel, the Catholic Monarchs of Spain. This position gave him close encounters with the characters in this book, making the work realistic and detailed.

=== Mester de Juglaría ===
Medieval Spanish poets recognized the Mester de Juglaría as a literary form written by the minstrels (juglares) and composed of varying line length and use of assonance instead of rhyme. These poems were sung to uneducated audiences, nobles and peasants alike.

==== Cantar de Mio Cid ====
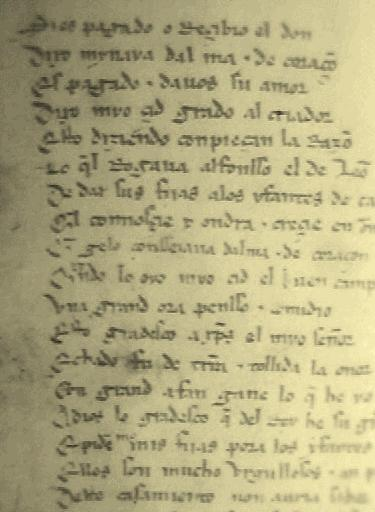
The Cantar de Mio Cid is the oldest preserved Spanish cantar de gesta

The epic poem Cantar de mio Cid was written about a real person, Rodrigo Díaz de Vivar ("el Cid", c. 1043 – 1099), and recounts his battles, conquests, and daily life. The anonymous poet composed it around 1140, although the only remaining copy was copied by Per Abbat in 1207 and is currently housed in the National Library of Spain. The poem narrates various parts of El Cid’s life: his first exile from King Alfonso VI, the military campaigns that lead to the conquest of Valencia, his daughters’ marriages to the princes of Carrión, and finally the restoring of his honor and position. This epic is considered realistic due to the closeness to historical events and accuracy of the details, even portraying correctly the areas in which Cid traveled and lived. Unlike other European epics, the poem is not idealized and there is no presence of supernatural beings. It has assonance instead of rhyme and its lines vary in length, usually between ten and twelve syllables, which makes it a type of mester de juglaria. The epic is divided into three parts, also known as cantos.

=== Mester de Clerecía ===
This Castilian narrative poetry known as the mester de clerecía became popular in the thirteenth century. It is the verse form of the learned poets, usually clerics (hence the name 'clerecía'). These poets carefully counted the number of syllables in each line and strived to achieve perfect lines. The line form is the Alexandrine line (14 syllables) with consonantal rhyme in stanzas of four lines each. This form is also known as the cuaderna vía "fourfold way" and was borrowed from France. It was popular until the late fourteenth century. Popular themes of these poets were Christian legends, lives of saints, and tales from classical antiquity. The poems were recited by villagers in public plazas.

Two traits separate this form from the Mester de Juglaría: didacticism and erudition. Castilian priest and poet Gonzalo de Berceo was one of the greatest followers of the mester de clerecía. All of his works were religious; two of the most well-known are Milagros de Nuestra Señora (about the miracles worked by Mary, mother of Jesus) and Vida de Santa Oria. Shem Tob ben Isaac Ardutiel, called "Sem Tob de Carrión", a Jewish poet born towards the end of the thirteenth century, was very admired for his Proverbios Morales. Fourteenth-century poet Juan Ruiz, called the "Arcipreste de Hita, used the cuaderna vía in parts of his famous work Libro de buen amor. He introduced sixteen-syllable lines.

==== Milagros de Nuestra Señora ====
Milagros de Nuestra Señora is a collection of poems written by Gonzalo de Berceo sometime between 1246-1252. The work begins with a prologue, then details 25 different miracles credited to Virgin Mary. The stories are not original to Berceo but rather taken from manuscripts written in Latin and translated into the Spanish dialect, Riojan. Each story presents a takeaway moral for the reader and works to increase religious understanding, while the work broadly introduced the Monasteries of San Millán de la Cogolla.

== Lyric poetry of the Middle Ages ==
Lyric poetry in the Middle Ages can be divided into three groups: the kharjas, the popular poems originating from folk-songs sung by commoners, and the courtly poetry of the nobles. Alfonso X el Sabio fits into the third group with his series of three hundred poems, written in Galician: Las cantigas de Santa María. Another poet, Juan Ruiz, also known as the Arcipreste de Hita, is an outstanding lyricist of the fourteenth century. His only work, Libro de buen amor is a framework tale in which he includes translations from Ovid, satires, little poems called serranillas, twenty-nine fables, a sermon on Christian armor, and many lyric poems that praise the Virgin Mary. Poet Íñigo López de Mendoza, the Marqués de Santillana (1398–1458), begins to show the movement away from the traditions of the Middle Ages. He shows a knowledge of Latin authors and familiarity with the works of Dante and Petrarch. Mendoza was also the first to introduce the sonnet into Spanish literature.

Another well-known medieval Spanish poet is Jorge Manrique. He is famous for his work which laments the death of his father, Coplas a la muerte de su padre. In this piece, Manrique shows classical feelings by expressing himself in a universal manner (all things come to an end). He is still considered a poet of the Middle Ages in that he finds peace and finality in religion.

=== The kharjas texts ===
The earliest recorded examples of a vernacular Romance-based literature date from the same time and location, the rich mix of Muslim, Jewish, and Christian cultures in al-Andalus, in which Maimonides, Averroes, and others worked. The kharjas, dating from the 9th to the 12th centuries C.E., were short poems spoken in local colloquial Iberian Romance languages known as Andalusi Romance, which was written with the Arabic script. The kharjas appeared at the end of longer poetry written in Arabic or Hebrew known as muwashshah, which were lengthy glosses on the ideas expressed in the kharjas. Typically spoken in the voice of a woman, the kharjas express the anxieties of love, particularly of its loss, as in the following example:

| Mozarabic: Vayse meu corachón de mib. ya Rab, ¿si me tornarád? ¡Tan mal meu doler li-l-habib! Enfermo yed, ¿cuánd sanarád? | Modern Spanish: Mi corazón se me va de mí. Ay Dios, ¿acaso se me tornará? ¡Tan fuerte mi dolor por el amado! Enfermo está, ¿cuándo sanará? | English: My heart is leaving me. Oh God, will it return? How horrible is the pain for my lover! Sick he is, when will he heal? |

This combination of Iberian Romance expression with Arabic script, only discovered in 1948, locates the rise of a Spanish literary tradition in the cultural heterogeneity that characterized medieval Spanish society and politics. However, the Andalusi Romance of the kharjas appears to be a separate language whose evolution from Vulgar Latin paralleled that of the languages in northern Spain such as Spanish rather than deriving from or fusing into it. While the relatively recent discovery of the kharjas challenges the pride of chronological place that belonged for so long to El Cantar de mio Cid (1140 C.E.) in the history of Spanish literature, they cannot be seen as a precursor to Spain's great epic poem. What the discovery of the kharjas makes clear instead is that from its origins, the literature of Spain has arisen out of and born witness to a rich, heterogeneous mix of cultures and languages.

== Mystery plays ==
Mystery plays are some of the earliest developed plays in medieval Europe. These plays focused primarily on religious stories and events ranging from Creation to the Last Judgement. The plays were usually performed by local guilds and, on occasion, travelled around town on caravans to reach a wider audience. The plays were written in stanza form and covered a wide variety of set designs and effects. Despite various attempts to ban these plays, they gained popularity and by the end of the 15th century they became commonplace for religious celebrations across parts of Europe.

=== Auto de los Reyes Magos ===
The Auto de los Reyes Magos is the oldest extant liturgical drama (12th century) written in Spanish language. It is a codex found in the library of the Toledo Cathedral and is a mystery play belonging to the Christmas cycle. It is a play about the Biblical Magi, three wise men from the East who followed a star and visited the baby Jesus in Bethlehem. It is believed to have been based on an earlier liturgical Latin play written in France.

=== Misteri d'Elx ===
The Misteri d'Elx (in English, the Elx Mystery Play or Mystery Play of Elx) is a liturgical drama dating from the Middle Ages, which is enacted and celebrated in the Basilica de Santa María in the city of Elx on 14 and 15 August of each year. In 2001, UNESCO declared it one of the Masterpieces of the Oral and Intangible Heritage of Humanity. It commemorates the Assumption of Mary.

== Bibliographical reference ==
- Alvar, Carlos, José-Carlos Mainer y Rosa Navarro, Breve historia de la literatura española, Alianza Editorial, Madrid, 2005.
- Cañas Murillo, Jesús, La poesía medieval: de las jarchas al Renacimiento, Anaya, Madrid, 1990.
- Deyermond, A. D., Historia de la literatura española, 1. La Edad Media, Ariel, Barcelona, 1989.
- Deyermond, Alan, Edad Media. Primer suplemento, vol. 1/1 de Francisco Rico, Historia y crítica de la literatura española, Crítica, Barcelona, 1991.
- Pedraza Jiménez, Felipe B. y Milagros Rodríguez Cáceres, Las épocas de la literatura española, Ariel, Barcelona, 2006.
- Rubio Tovar, Joaquín, La prosa medieval, Playor, Madrid, 1982.
