= Cantar de los Siete Infantes de Lara =

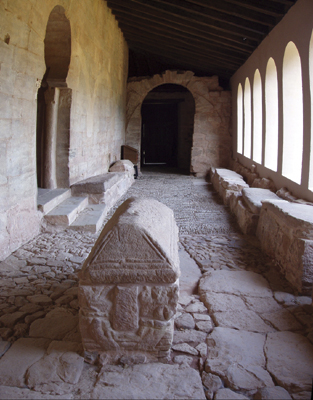
Portal of Gonzalo de Berceo in the Monastery of San Millán de Suso, which contains a sarcophagus claimed to be that of the seven infantes of the legend.

The Cantar de los Siete Infantes de Lara ("Song of the Seven Lara Princes") is a legend, perhaps derived from a lost cantar de gesta, that relates a tale of family feuding and revenge, centering on the murder of the eponymous seven infantes (princes) of Lara or Salas. The legend survives in prose form in medieval chronicles, the oldest being in the extended version of the Estoria de España (History of Spain) compiled during the reign of Sancho IV of Castile before 1289 (edited by Ramón Menéndez Pidal under the name Primera Crónica General).

From the account found in this chronicle as well as mention in the Crónica de 1344 (Segunda Crónica General) and interpolations into a copy of the Tercera Crónica General dating from 1512, Menéndez Pidal found evidence for the existence of an ancient lost cantar de gesta that scholars have since partially reconstructed, dating back to the year 1000. This work would, along with the Cantar de Mio Cid and the Poema de Fernán González, represent one of the most important epic cantares of Castilian literature, and the most primitive example of the Spanish epic. The legendary tradition of the Infantes de Lara has also been developed through ballads. Some more recent scholars have rejected this, dating the story to shortly before the surviving prose versions.

The Infantes de Lara were the children of Castilian nobleman Gonzalo Gustioz of Lara or Salas and his wife "Doña Sancha" (lady Sancha). The story revolves around a family feud, an escalating tit-for-tat cycle of revenge, between their family and that of Sancha's brother, Ruy Velázquez and his wife Doña Lambra.

== The legend ==
According to the version transmitted by the Estoria de España, at the wedding between Doña Lambra, from Bureba, and Ruy Velázquez of Lara, a confrontation arose between the bride's family and the sons of Sancha, the infantes. In this confrontation, Alvar Sánchez, cousin of Doña Lambra, was killed by Gonzalo González, the youngest of the seven Lara princes. Later Gonzalo González is seen by Doña Lambra, having undressed to his undergarments to bathe his goshawk, and Lambra interprets it as an intentional sexual provocation. Taking advantage of this to avenge the death of her cousin Alvar, Lambra orders her servant to strip and humiliate Gonzalo González in front of her brothers, throwing a blood-covered cucumber at him. The irate Gonzalo and his brothers respond by killing the servant at Lambra's feet, spattering her with her servant's blood.

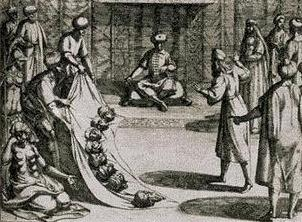
Almanzor shows the heads of the seven infantes, plus that of a faithful retainer, to their father Gonzalo Gustioz. Engraving by Otto Venius, seventeenth century.

Thirsting for revenge, Lambra and her husband Ruy Velázquez come up with a plan to send the father of the infantes, Gonzalo Gustioz, lord of Salas, as envoy to the ruler of Córdoba, Almanzor, to request money to help pay for their lavish wedding. Unbeknownst to him, he carries a letter that tells Almanzor of Ruy's plans to have the infantes ambushed and murdered, and requesting that their father, letter's bearer, likewise be killed. Ruy Velásquez carries out the ambush of his nephews using Muslim troops and supervises their beheading, sending the severed heads to Córdoba to torment their father. His painful laments for his sons represent one of the most emotional in all of Castilian epic tradition Almanzor takes pity on him and merely has him imprisoned. In the earliest surviving version, a female servant is assigned to tend to him, and they fall in love and have a sexual liaison. In the later version of the Crónica de 1344, she is a sister of Almanzor himself and is offered up to Gonzalo, who takes her by force. She becomes pregnant and has a son named Mudarra González.

Shortly before his release, when Gonzalo Gustioz learns his lover is expecting a child, he sees the opportunity for help in his planned revenge against Ruy Velázquez. He takes a ring and breaks it in two, keeping one half and leaving the other to be given the child, so that later they will be able to recognize each other by matching the two sides. The child, Mudarra González, grows up and goes north to Castile to find his father, and they unite the two halves of the ring, which fit perfectly. The version in the Crónica de 1344 has the aged Gonzalo Gustioz become blind and when the halves of the ring are aligned, he miraculously regains his sight and the ring is permanently rejoined. It is Mudarra, the son born to the captive Gonzalo, who eventually avenges the killing of his half-brothers by murdering Ruy Velásquez and burning Lambra alive.

== Literary analysis ==
Menéndez Pidal argued that the rendition of the existing legend found in the chronicles likely used an epic poem and ancient cantar de gesta composed around the year 990 as sources. He deduced this from the abundance of assonant rhymes and other features common to epic literature that are retained in the chronicle prose. There is a consensus among philologists that there was a Cantar de Los Siete Infantes de Lara, as the verses of the epic were not overly disturbed. Attempts have been made to reconstruct the original Cantar. In this regard, Mercedes Vaquero has identified signs in the prose texts of oral delivery, suggesting that at some point there was a lay that was either spoken or sung.

The Cantar de los Siete Infantes de Lara (or de Salas) refers to the historical situation in Castile about 990, and this has been used to date the poem, although not all scholars agree that the epic predates 1000, as this would place it before the great French epic cycles that could have been its inspiration. Barton states that recent analysis places the origin of the story in the 13th century.

In this regard, Carlos and Manuel Alvar note that many of the primitive motivations expressed in the Cantar de Los Siete Infantes de Lara relate more with the Scandinavian and Germanic epics (such as Nibelungenlied) than with the Romance epics. These include the importance of blood ties, the cruelty of revenge as a way of imposing an individual justice not supported by social institutions or a body of law, and the aggressiveness of passionate sexually charged relationships. Erich von Richthofen in his studies of this epic has pointed to numerous analogies with the epic of central and northern Europe, in particular stating that in addition to many original Castilian elements and motifs, the epic of the Lara princes has many in common with the Thidrekssaga - the disgrace of Odila and her husband Sifka's planned revenge, his collaboration with his friend the governor, Fridrek's trip with his six companions and their ambush by the governor that leads to the death of the seven knights; plus details provided to the episodes of the death of Egard and Aki at Fritila, the theme of skulls sent to a father, and the revenge of the Hogni's son.

The idea of a Muslim woman assisting a prisoner to escape plays a role in other popular stories of the time. Orderic Vitalis tells an analogous story relating to Bohemond I of Antioch, while such an episode also appears in the Prise d'Orange, a 12th-century Chanson de geste. His relationship with Almanzor's sister is the trigger and mechanism by which Gonzalo gets his revenge on his brother- and sister-in-law, while the sister of Almanzor is seen as a proxy for all of Muslim Al-Andalus, taken by force, and producing a righteous Christian progeny represented by Mudarra, the product of the liaison, praised as a "very good Christian and at God’s service, and was the most honourable man that there was in Castile, apart from Count Garcia Fernandez". According to Ramón Menéndez Pidal, the subplot in which the ring is used for recognition shows the Germanic origin of the Spanish epic. Barton notes sexual imagery in the episode involving Gonzalo González and Doña Lambra, with Gonzalo bathing his goshawk a metaphor for masturbation, and the blood-covered cucumber representing castration.

According to Ramón Menéndez Pidal there were several versions of the poem, some much later than the original. The name of the song would be Los Siete Infantes de Salas, since the name "Lara" is not mentioned. In this, Doña Lambra is married to Ruy Velázquez. He does not assert that all the characters are historical, indeed, he was not able to find any historical evidence for the majority of the characters. Its poetic elements included the deaths of the infantes and their avenger, Mudarra.

Alan Deyermond notes that the background story contains common and universal themes of folklore, such as the letter ordering the death of the messenger (a point of commonality with Hamlet), the love of a young woman for her brother's captive, and the protagonist's mysterious ancestry. The Englishman observed that the Cantar de los Siete Infantes de Lara or Salas is valued for its antiquity and priority in its genre, and it reflects what would be the heroic age of the birth and formation of Castile, a period which in turn was when the epic saw gestation in the villages. In addition, he extols the forceful rendering of some passages, such as when Mudarra threatens Doña Lambra and her attempt to seek protection.

No manuscript of the Cantar de los Siete Infantes de Lara survives (although Ramón Menéndez Pidal and, to a lesser extent, Erich von Richthofen have reconstructed many of its verses), yet it has had a large influence on later literature. A partial list includes:

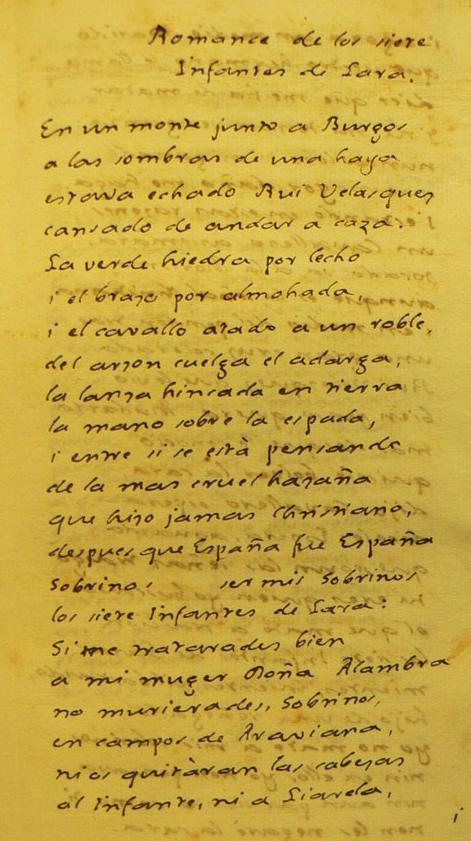
Romance manuscript telling of the siete infantes de Lara. Biblioteca Nacional de la República Argentina

- The prose rendering of the Cantar in the Primera Crónica General, the Crónica de 1344, and the Crónica de los Veinte Reyes.
- Fragments of the Cantar in Romance epics, mostly old Ballads. Six epic romances of the infantes de Lara survive.
- Several plays, including:
  - Siete Infantes, written by Juan de la Cueva in 1579.
  - El Bastardo Mudarra, written in 1612 by Lope de Vega.
  - La Gran Tragedia de los Siete Infantes de Lara, written by Alonso Hurtado Velarde between 1612 and 1624.
- Los SIete Infantes de Lara, a novel by Manuel Fernández y González, published in 1853.
- El Moro Expósito (1834), a poem in hendecasyllable metre by the Duke of Rivas.

== Sarcophagi and tombs ==
Since ancient times several monasteries have exhibited relics of the legendary Siete Infantes. Such links with prestigious heroes (be they real or fictional) and the pilgrims attracted by them provided these ecclesiastical establishments with increased economic resources. Thus, the supposed sarcophaguses of the seven infantes are exhibited in the Monastery of San Millan de Suso, although the authenticity of the claimed remains of the brothers is disputed by other monasteries, such as San Pedro de Arlanza; also the church of Santa María de Salas de los Infantes claims to have their heads, and long exhibited seven skulls as those of the brothers; on the other hand, the tomb of Mudarra is said to be in Burgos Cathedral. The contest for possession of relics of famous heroes from legend has been common since the Middle Ages.

== Sources ==
- ALVAR, Carlos y Manuel Alvar, Épica medieval española, Madrid, Cátedra, 1997. ISBN 978-84-376-0975-1, especially the chapters "Siete Infantes de Lara", pp. 175–270.
- ANTELO IGLESIAS, Antonio: “Filología e historiografía en la obra de Ramón Menéndez Pidal”. Thesaurus. Boletín del Instituto Caro y Cuervo. Tomo XIX. October–December 1964. No. 3.
- BARTON, Simon, Conquerors, Brides and Concubines: Interfaith Relations and Social Power in Medieval Iberia. Philadelphia: University of Pennsylvania Press, 2015.
- DEYERMOND, Alan D., Historia de la literatura española, vol. 1: La Edad Media, Barcelona, Ariel, 2001 (1st ed. 1973), pp. 78–81. ISBN 84-344-8305-X
- MENÉNDEZ PIDAL, Ramón (1896): La Leyenda de los Siete Infantes de Lara. Three editions of this study exist:
  - La leyenda de los siete infantes de Lara. Madrid: Press of the sons of José M. Ducazcal, 1896.
  - with numerous additions in: Obras de R. Menéndez Pidal, Vol. 1. “La leyenda de los Infantes de Lara”. Madrid: Centro de Estudios Históricos, 1934.
  - in Obras Completas de Ramón Menéndez Pidal, Vol. I, "La Leyenda de los Siete Infantes de Lara". Madrid: Espasa-Calpe, 1971, which reproduces the previous edition and adds various work published since 1934.
- MENÉNDEZ PIDAL, Ramón; Poesía juglaresca y juglares; Espasa-Calpe Argentina; Buenos Aires - México; 1948 (2nd edición); pp. 195–196.
- RICHTHOFEN, Erich von, «Interdependencia épico-medieval: dos tangentes góticas», Dicenda: Cuadernos de filología hispánica, no. 9, 1990, Madrid, Universidad Complutense, pp. 171–186. ISSN 0212-2952.
- VAQUERO, Mercedes, "Señas de oralidad en algunos motivos épicos compartidos: Siete infantes de Lara, Romanz del infant García y Cantar de Sancho II", Aengus Ward (coord.), Actas del XII Congreso de la Asociación Internacional de Hispanistas, 21-26 de agosto de 1995, Birmingham, vol. 1, (Medieval y Lingüística), págs. 320-327, University of Birmingham: Department of Hispanic Studies, 1998. ISBN 0-7044-1899-1.
