= Estoria de España =

Book by Alfons X van Castilië

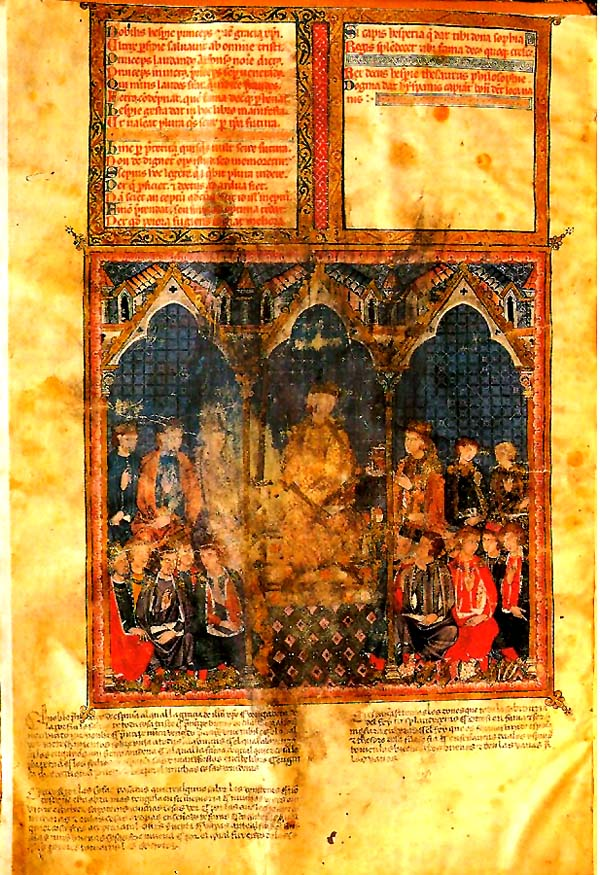
Manuscript of the Estoria de España of Alfonso X of Castile.

The Estoria de España ("History of Spain"), also known in the 1906 edition of Ramón Menéndez Pidal as the Primera Crónica General ("First General Chronicle"), is a history book written on the initiative of Alfonso X of Castile "El Sabio" ("the Wise"), reigned 1252-1284, and who was actively involved in the chronicle's editing. It is believed to be the first extended history of Spain in Old Spanish, a West Iberian Romance language that forms part of the lineage from Vulgar Latin to modern Spanish. Many prior works were consulted in constructing this history.

The book narrates a history beginning in Biblical and legendary origins and continues through the history of Castile under Fernando III of Castile. In the style of chronicles of its time, it begins by retelling the stories of remote origins found in the Bible. From the time of Moses onward, the mix begins to include Greek sources on ancient history. However, as the story continues, the details become increasingly detailed, especially from the Germanic invasions to the time of Alfonso's father Fernando III.

The work is divided into four large parts. The first includes a history of Ancient Rome: the medieval European monarchs considered themselves heirs to the Roman Empire. The second tells the history of the barbarian and Gothic kings, treated as antecedents within the Iberian Peninsula. The third is a history of the Kingdom of Asturias from which the Reconquista (the Christian reconquest of Iberia from Muslim rule) began. The fourth and final part is a history of the Kingdoms of León and Castile.

== Structure ==
Not all of the Estoria de España was completed during the reign of Alfonso X. The edition of Ramón Menéndez Pidal does not show all of the work actually completed during that reign and endorsed by Alfonso, but has the advantage of providing a linear narrative that offers the reader a comprehensive narrative history of Spain from its origins to the death of Fernando III, as intended by Alfonso.

The Estoria is divided into four large parts; the chapter numbers are from Menéndez Pidal's edition:

- Prologue by Alfonso X, written in the first person
- First part : Primitive and Roman history (chapters 1–364):

History of primitive Spain and history of Spain in the era of the Roman consuls (1–116)
Era of Julius Caesar (117–121)
Era of the Roman Empire (122–364)

- Second part : Visigothic history (chapters 365–565):

Barbarian kings and the first Visigothic kings until Euric (365–429)
Later Visigothic kings (430–565)

- Third part : Asturian-Leonese history (chapters 566–801):

Asturian-Leonese kings (566–677)
Leonese kings (678–801)

- Fourth part : Castilian-Leonese history (chapters 802–1135)

== Editions ==
There were two major periods of work on the book. The first occurred between circa 1260 and 1274. The second, producing the version known as the "critical version", was written between 1282 and 1284, the date of Alfonso's death.

As early as 1271 Alfonso authorized a version, known as the "Royal" or "Primitive" version, which carried the history only down to the reign of Fernando I of Castile (reigned 1033–1065), with some rough drafts down to the time of Alfonso VII of León and Castile (reigned 1135–1157). A serious political crisis in 1272 —a rebellion by nobility hostile to Alfonso's imperial ambitions—postponed work for several months. The team of scholars continued working with less supervision from the king, producing the "Concise" or "Vulgar" version in 1274. These editions completed in the 1270s, already had the four-part structure.

Unfortunately for Alfonso X, the following years were hardly more peaceful: Maghrebi invasions, rebellions, the premature death of his designated heir Fernando de la Cerda. Furthermore, Alfonso undertook another monumental literary project: the compilation of a universal history entitled General estoria or Grande e general estoria. This interrupted work on the Estoria de España, but, given the focus back to Biblical times, the subject matter overlapped significantly. Work was not resumed until 1282, when Alfonso established his court in Seville. In the light of recent and difficult times, Alfonso disowned the original version of 1271, and proposed a new edition reflecting the experience of facing a rebellious forces including even his own son Sancho. This "Critical" version was not completed in Alfonso's lifetime.

Sancho, succeeding Alfonso as Sancho IV of Castile, continued the work, producing the "Amplified" version of 1289.

In its various versions, the Estoria de España spread, expanded, and served as historical canon well into the modern era. A definitive edition was approved by Alfonso X up to chapter 616. The contradictions identified in the latter chapters of Menéndez Pidal's edition, the Primera Crónica General, can be attributed not to the will of Alfonso, but to Menéndez Pidal making use of late and unsatisfactory manuscripts of the Estoria.

=== The Primera Crónica General de España (1906) ===
In 1906, philologist Ramón Menéndez Pidal published the texts of two manuscripts (the second continuing the story of the first, which concludes with the Muslim conquest of Spain) conserved at the library of El Escorial, which he believed to be originals from the time of Alfonso X. He entitled the collection the Primera Crónica General de España - Estoria de España que mandó componer Alfonso el Sabio y se continuaba bajo Sancho IV en 1289 ("First general chronicle of Spain: History of Spain ordered to be composed by Alfonso the wise and continued under Sancho IV in 1289"). Later critics—especially Diego Catalán—demonstrated that only the first manuscript and the earlier parts of the second came from the royal ateliers. The rest was an assemblage of manuscripts of various origins, dating from the end of the 13th century and the beginning of the 14th. These were undoubtedly brought together by chancellor Fernán Sánchez de Valladolid towards the end of the reign of Alphonse XI.

== Worldview ==
The Estoria puts forth a worldview heavily influenced by the Policraticus written a century earlier by John of Salisbury and then in vogue in political circles of the Christian West: the kingdom is a body, the king its head and heart, the people the limbs. Recognizing the difficulty of putting into practice the precepts inspired by these ideas, the king proposed to develop a panoply of scientific, literary, artistic, and historical works intended to convey his political ideas through the several juridical collections he drafted, notably the Espéculo and the Siete Partidas.

The Estoria played a role in elaborating a common past for the nation (in the medieval sense of that word), to build an identity, and for the individual to find his place in this group. National history is recounted in such a way as to inspire in the readers behaviors sought by the monarchy. The Estoria elaborates a moral basis for the king and his designs by furnishing positive and negative examples to his subjects—at least those who had access to books. Though that was a relatively small proportion of the populace, it was a relatively large proportion of the often rebellious nobility. For example, the narration of the fall of the Visigoths provides an occasion to denounce the evil of internal wars. This history of Spain written in Castilian court served also to support the Neogothic ideology the kingdoms of León and Castile were the repositories of the authority of kings Visigoths who fled the Muslim conquest. In claiming the legacy of the Goths, who had secured the political and religious unity of the entire peninsula, the Castilians sought to impose their hegemony on various peninsular kingdoms: Aragon, Navarre, Portugal and of course the Muslim territories.

== Sources ==
The sources upon which the work draws most heavily for details were the lengthy Latin chronicles that, at that time, constituted the most complete account of the history of Spain: the Chronicon mundi (1236) by Lucas de Tuy, bishop of Tuy, known as el Tudense, and De rebus Hispaniae (1243) by Rodrigo Ximénez de Rada, bishop of Toledo, known as el Toledano. Besides these sources, Alfonso and his collaborators drew on other medieval Latin chronicles, the Bible, classical Latin historiography, ecclesiastical legends, chansons de geste, and Arab historians.

The existence of written epics in languages descended from Vulgar Latin was not unprecedented, but there had never before been such detailed and expansive chroniclers' prose versions of these poems, to the point where one can reliably reconstruct lost chansons de geste, such as the Condesa traidora ("Traitor Countess"), the Romanz del Infant García ("Romance of Prince García") and the Cantar de Sancho II ("Song of Sancho II"), as well as large fragments of the Cantar de los Siete Infantes de Lara ("Song of the Seven Lara Princes"), the Poema de Fernán González ("Poem of Fernán González") and the Mocedades de Rodrigo ("Deeds of the Young Rodrigo").

Arabic influences can be seen in Alfonso's style, with the use of comparisons and similes not habitual in the Western prose of the time. They can also be seen in an historic perspective and a notable equilibrium in episodes to which Andalusian sources brought a different focus. Arab historiography can also be credited for the awareness in the Estoria de España of economic and social aspects of history.

== Significance for language ==
The great originality of the Estoria de España was to write such a work in the Castilian language of its time, rather than Latin. Since the time of Alfonso's father Fernando III, this had become a language of court. A translation of the Libro Juzgo, a compendium of Visigothic law, had been translated during Fernando's reign. Still, systematic use of what would now be called Old Spanish begins in the time of Alfonso X, in particular because of the ever wider circulation of manuscripts of the Estoria and other works in the court, to the nobility, and to the monasteries and cathedrals. This began the cultural hegemony that led Castilian to become the dominant language of Spain and, later, its empire.

This adoption of Castilian as the language for the work led to a true process of literary creation. Under Alfonso X, in this and other works, Castilian becomes a literary language.

Alfonso's nephew Juan Manuel, Prince of Villena, author of Tales of Count Lucanor ("Libro de los ejemplos del conde Lucanor y de Patronio") was greatly inspired by the Estoria.
