= Romancero =

Collection of Spanish romances, a type of folk ballad

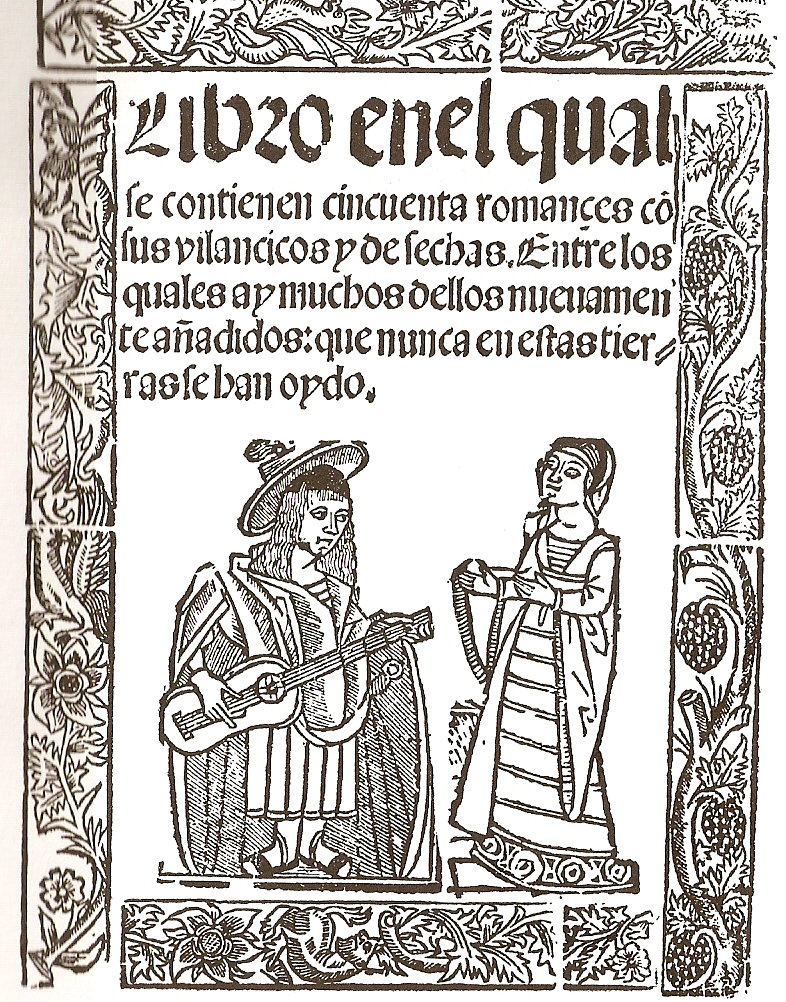
Cover page for Libro de los cincuenta romances (Book of Fifty Romances), 1525

A romancero is a collection of Spanish romances, a type of folk ballad (sung narrative). The romancero is the entire corpus of such ballads. As a distinct body of literature they borrow themes such as war, honour, aristocracy and heroism from epic poetry, especially the medieval cantar de gesta and chivalric romance, and they often have a pretense of historicity.

The romancero was once thought to extend back in time to before the earliest Old Spanish cantares, like the Cantar de mio Cid, but it is now argued that they are instead successors to the truly epic chivalric genres. The earliest examples of romances date from the fourteenth century, and some are shortened narrations of stories drawn from the cantares and romances. Many tales take place against the backdrop of the Reconquista, showing Spaniards and Moors in conflict or in love, while others draw their themes from the Matter of Britain or the Matter of France. The ballads form a continuous link in the chain of tradition from the earliest Spanish vernacular literature to the literature of the 20th century.

Romancero gitano ("Gitano Romancero") is the title of a book of songs by Federico García Lorca, many of which have themes derived from the life and culture of the gitanos of Andalusia.
