= Fresno de Caracena =

- Municipality
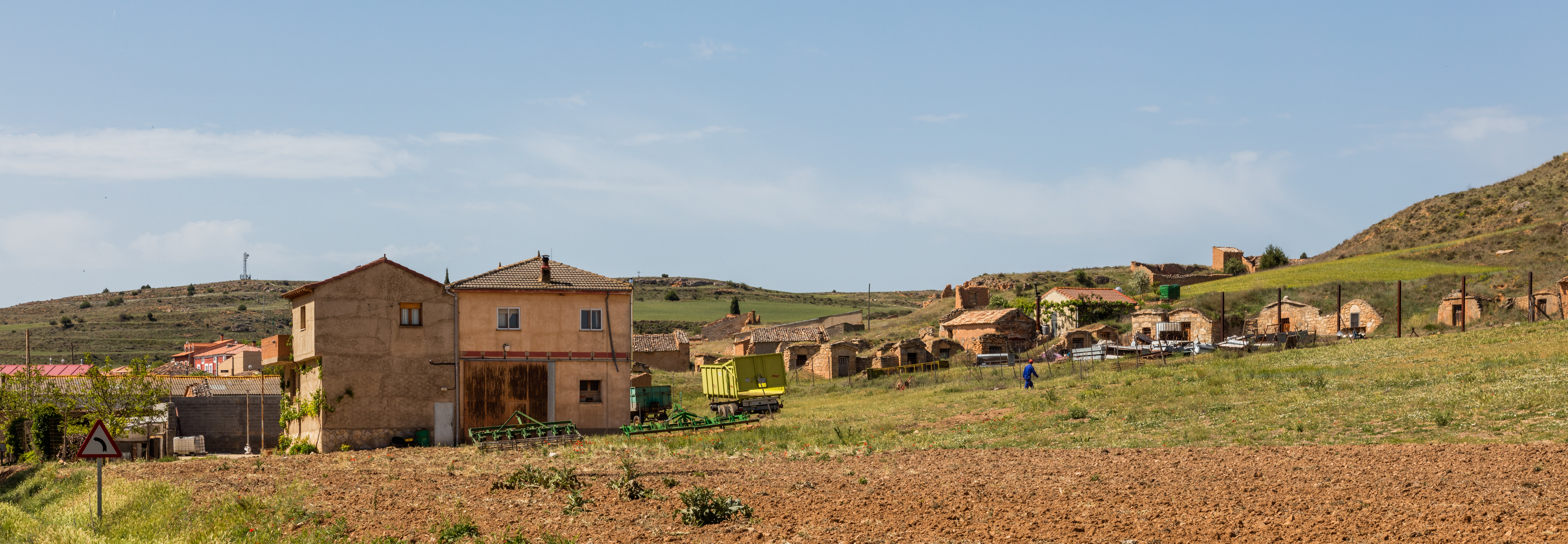
- View of Fresno de Caracena Village

- Location in Spain. Fresno de Caracena (Spain)
- Coordinates: 41°27′09″N 3°05′26″W
- Country: Spain
- Autonomous community: Castile and León
- Province: Soria
- Comarca: Tierras del Burgo

Government
  - Mayor: Tomás Arranz Bravo (People's Party)

Area
  - Total: 16.78 km^{2} (6.48 sq mi)
- Elevation: 952 m (3,123 ft)

Population (2023)
  - Total: 22
  - Density: 1.3/km^{2} (3.4/sq mi)
- Time zone: UTC+1 (CET)
  - Summer (DST): UTC+2 (CEST)
- Climate: Cfb
- Website: Official website

Fresno de Caracena is a municipality located in the province of Soria, in the autonomous community of Castile and León, Spain. It had a population of 22 inhabitants in 2023 and it is one of the less populated areas of the country. Fresno de Caracena is the place where Pere Abat was a cleric, who is supposedly the author of the book "El Cantar del Mio Cid".

Fresno de Caracena is also the location of a 12th-century church and a rollo picota used in the past to hang criminals.
