= Berceo =

- Municipality
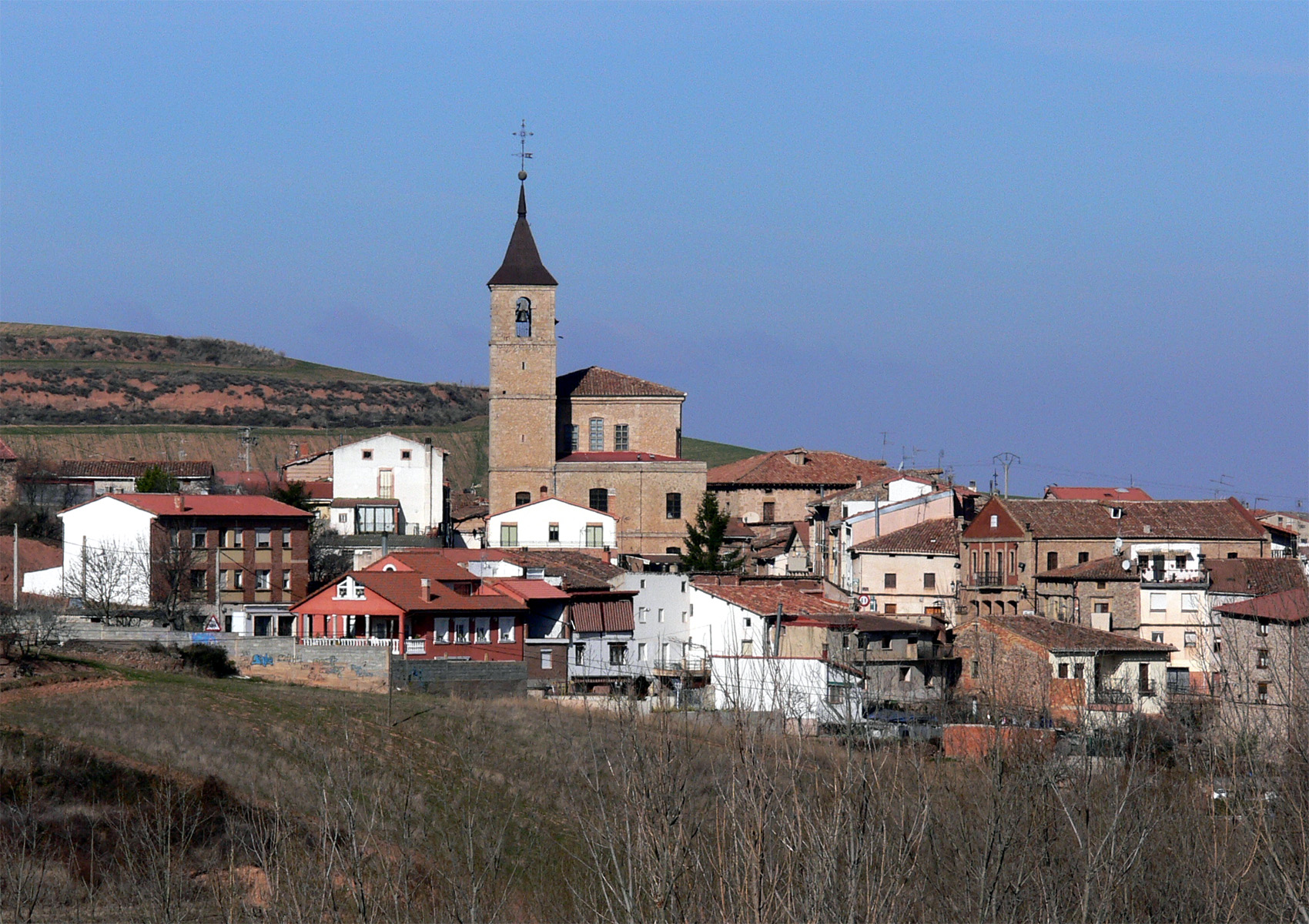
- Street of Bergasillas Berceo

- Coat of arms

- Location within La Rioja, Spain Location within Spain
- Coordinates: 42°20′17″N 2°51′07″W
- Country: Spain
- Autonomous community: La Rioja
- Comarca: Anguiano

Government
  - Mayor: José Félix Aransay Azofra (IU)
- Elevation: 722 m (2,369 ft)

Population (2025-01-01)
  - Total: 143
- Demonym(s): berceíno, na
- Postal code: 26327
- Website: www.ayuntamientodeberceo.org

Berceo is a municipality in La Rioja, Spain. It is located near the monastery of San Millán de la Cogolla and was the birthplace of Gonzalo de Berceo. It has also been proposed as identification of historic Vergegio, named by Braulio of Zaragoza as the birthplace of Saint Millán, although present Berdejo in Aragon is another candidate.
