= The Miracles of Our Lady =

Literary work by Gonzalo de Berceo

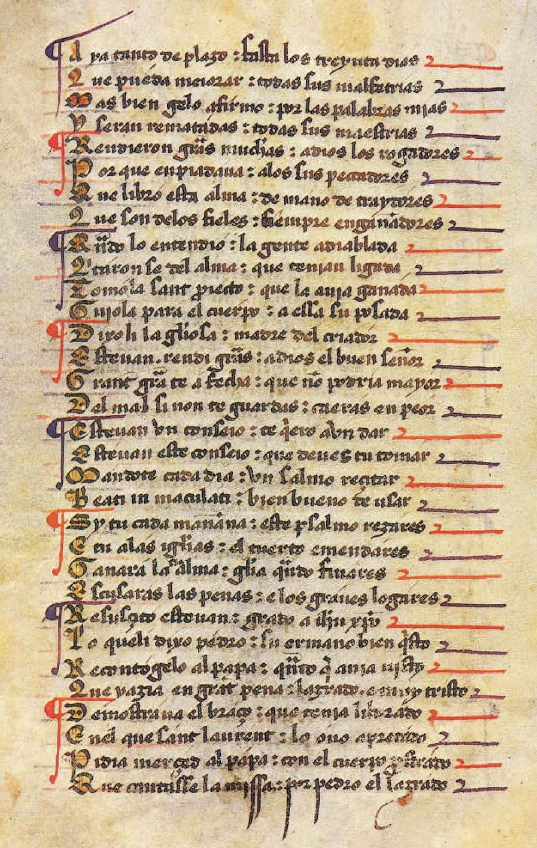
14th century manuscript

The Miracles of Our Lady (Spanish: Milagros de Nuestra Señora) is the main work of Gonzalo de Berceo.

The work is a collection of exempla about twenty-five reported miracles of Mary, mother of Jesus, written around 1260 in a sort of Spanish dialect called Riojan.

== Context and influence ==
The sources used by Gonzalo de Berceo were various collections of tales about the miracles written in Latin. He made use of the characteristic resources of the minstrels (see Mester de Juglaría). Gonzalo de Berceo belonged to the Mester de Clerecía. The book helped to promote Marian devotions among the people by making the subject easier to understand for the people of his time, but it contains many unorthodox elements that give Mary powers of resurrection or the ability to save sinners from Divine Judgement.

== Structure ==
The work's introduction, which features the author himself, is allegorical. It is set in an idealized natural scene, which symbolizes the virtues and perfections of the Virgin. The introduction is followed by twenty-five miracles performed by the Virgin for her devotees. At the end of each story there is a moraleja (moral) or teaching to make the advantages of devotion to Mary apparent to the listener or reader. These miracles can be categorised into three different types:

- Miracles in which Mary rewards or punishes men, e.g. La casulla de San Idelfonso.
- Miracles in which the Mary forgives and assures the salvation of her devotees, e.g. El sacristán impúdico, El Judezno, Milagro de Teófilo.
- Miracles in which the characters suffer a spiritual crisis which Mary helps them to solve, e.g. La abadesa encinta.

== See also ==
- William the Trouvère

== Bibliography ==
- Miracles of Our Lady by Gonzalo de Berceo, edited by Richard Terry Mount 1998 ISBN 0-8131-2019-5
