= Cantar de gesta =

Medieval Spanish epic poetry genre

A cantar de gesta is a genre of medieval Spanish poetry, analogous to the chanson de geste in Old French. Cantares de gesta incorporate aspects of epic poetry.

The most important cantares de gesta of Castile was:

- The Cantar de Mio Cid, where the triumph of the true nobility, founded on effort, merit and optimism is narrated, as opposed to the blood nobility that the fictitious characters Infantes of Carrión represent.
- The Poema de Fernán González, which presents a mix of history and legend concerning the first Count of Castile, Fernán González.
- The Cantar de los Siete Infantes de Lara, where a right revenge long delayed is narrated.
- The Cantar de Bernardo del Carpio, that narrates the tragic history of a bastard of noble origin attempting to procure the release from prison of his father, Count of Saldaña, jailed for having secretly married the King's sister; in his efforts to rehabilitate the family honor, he is unfairly treated by his king Alfonso the Chaste.
- The Mocedades de Rodrigo composed around 1360 is the latest epic cantar épico that is conserved. It is based on an earlier cantar of the youth of Rodrigo that dates from the second half of the 13th century. It narrates events in the youth of El Cid.

Smaller importance had the Mainete, the Cantar del Cerco de Zamora and others. However, only the Cantar de Mio Cid, the Cantar de Rodrigo and a few verses of the Cantar de Roncesvalles have been preserved in written form. The philologues have reconstructed other passages of the lost Castilian epic from fragments turned into prose in chronicles, where they served as sources of information.

The characteristics of the Spanish cantares de gesta are:

- Irregular verses, mainly between 14 and 16 syllables, divided in two hemistiches and with assonant rhyme, as opposed to regular verses and consonant rhyme of French chansons de geste.
- Predominance of realism and historicity as opposed to the more legendary and less historical character of French chanson de geste.
- Use of expressions that demand the attention of the public.
- Very abundant verbs, because the action predominates.
- Suppression of formulas that introduce the direct dialogue with the purpose of making the narration more agile, perhaps because some passages of Spanish cantares de gesta were semi-enacted (thereof also its greater realism).
- Use of brief descriptions, full of plasticity.
- Use of epic names to characterize the individuals.
- Use of the paragogic e.

== See also ==
- Mester de Juglaría
- Mester de Clerecía
