= William the Trouvère =

Anglo-Norman translator (fl. 1150–1200)

William (né Adgar; fl. 1150–1200), later called William the Trouvère, was an English poet. He translated tales from the Latin Miracles of the Virgin into Anglo-Norman verse.

== Works ==
William was first called Adgar but became more commonly known as William. Working at the instance of one Gregory, his friend, he translated over forty tales into octosyllabic Anglo-Norman verse, from the Latin collection of Miracles of the Virgin which he found in the almarie or bookcase of St. Paul's. His collection of some forty-nine tales, entitled Gracial, was dedicated to one Maud, "dame Mahaut", most likely the abbess of Barking (c. 1175–1195) who was a bastard of Henry II.

== See also ==
- Cantigas de Santa Maria
- The Miracles of Our Lady
- Trouvère

== Sources ==
- Hunt, Tony (2004). "Adgar [William] (fl. 1150x1200), Anglo-Norman translator". Oxford Dictionary of National Biography (online ed.). Oxford University Press. doi:10.1093/ref:odnb/29473. (Subscription or UK public library membership required.)

Attribution:

- This article incorporates text from a publication now in the public domain: Bateson, Mary (1900). "William the Trouvère". In Lee, Sidney (ed.). Dictionary of National Biography. Vol. 61. London: Smith, Elder & Co. p. 364.
