= Mocedades de Rodrigo =

Castilian medieval song

- The youthful deeds of Rodrigo, the Cid
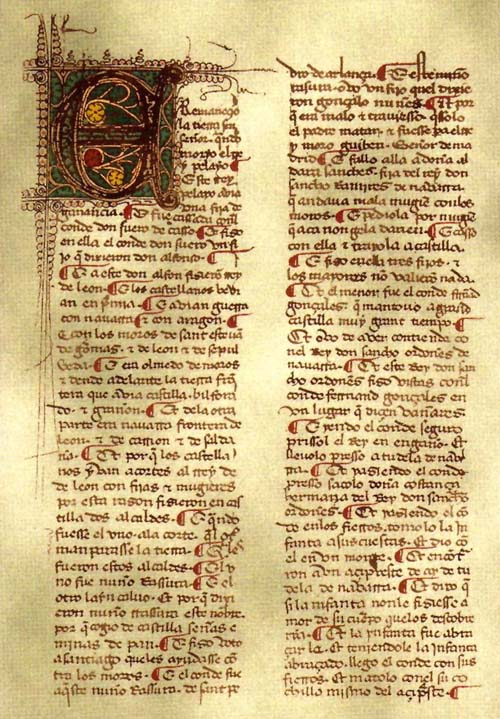
- Also known as: Cantar de Rodrigo y el Rey Fernando (The lay of Rodrigo and King Fernando)
- Author(s): unknown
- Language: Old Spanish
- Date: composed around 1360
- Manuscript(s): unique manuscript. Bibliotèque Royale, Paris, nº 12, olim Cod. 9988.
- Genre: epic poetry
- Verse form: anisosyllabic with assonant rhyme
- Length: 1164 verses

The Mocedades de Rodrigo is an anonymous Castilian cantar de gesta, composed around 1360, that relates the origins and exploits of the youth of the legendary hero El Cid (Rodrigo Díaz de Vivar).

There are 1,164 surviving verses, preceded by an initial prose fragment. The only codex that contains the work is a manuscript from 1400 that is kept in the National Library of Paris. The text that has reached us lacks a title, and critics have variously titled the work Mocedades de Rodrigo or del Cid ("The youthful deeds of Rodrigo, the Cid"), Refundición de las Mocedades de Rodrigo ("A Recasting of the Youthful Deeds of Rodrigo"), Cantar de Rodrigo y el Rey Fernando ("Song of Rodrigo and King Fernando") and Crónica rimada del Cid ("The Rhyming Chronicle of El Cid").

Traditionally, the Mocedades has been valued more for its role in the history of literature that as literature itself. It generated a tradition of romances about the youth of El Cid that culminated in the French drama Le Cid by Pierre Corneille and the ensuing "Quarrel of the Cid".

== Plot ==
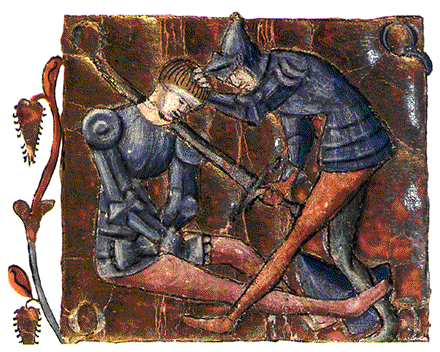
Young Rodrigo defeating count Don Gómez.

After the initial character genealogy, in which the ancestry of the hero is recounted, the poem tells how the young Rodrigo killed an enemy of his father, the count Don Goméz, himself father of Jimena Díaz. In order to make amends for his guilt, King Ferdinand orders him to marry Jimena. However the hero refuses, in a common folkloric motif of postponement of an obligation through the pursuit a difficult and long-lasting mission, until he has won five battles.

Although the five battles had remained vague in earlier versions of the Mocedades de Rodrigo, in this particular text, they can be considered to be the victory against the Moor Burgos de Ayllón, the victory against the champion of Aragon for the possession of Calahorra, the defense of Castile against the conspiracy of the treacherous counts, the battle against five allied Moors and the moving of the seat of the bishop of Palencia. At this point, the king of France, the Emperor of the Holy Roman Empire and the Pope demand a humiliating tribute from Castile, amongst the items demanded in tribute are fifteen noble virgin maidens each year. Faced with this situation, Rodrigo encourages King Fernando to conquer France and together, finally, they will triumph over the coalition formed by the count of Savoy, the King of France, the Emperor and the Pope. After this tremendous victory and in the middle of the negotiations over the surrender, the manuscript ends.

== Date and authorship ==
Alan Deyermond places the writing of the manuscript around 1360 in the region of Palencia, credited to an educated author, possibly a priest, who, according to Deyermond and Samuel G. Armistead, was re-elaborating a text from the second half of the 13th century, now lost, and which is known by the name of "Gesta de las Mocedades de Rodrigo."

The fact that earlier versions of the poem do not allude at all to the diocese of Palencia suggests that the work was composed to publicise this ecclesiastical demarcation during a period of time spanning an economic and political crisis. To associate the figure of an already very legendary Cid to the history of this religious demarcation was to bring parishioners and resources to the bishop. This same motivation had already been present in the propagandist work of Gonzalo de Berceo with respect to San Millán de la Cogolla.

On the other hand, Juan Victorio postulates the author to be a native of Zamora (who very well may be related professionally with the diocese of Palencia) and educated, as shown by the author's diplomatic and heraldic knowledge. His theory is supported by the presence in the Mocedades of some Leonese linguistics, the knowledge of Zamorano microtoponymy shown by the author, the constant placing of the king's court in Zamoma in the poem, the encounter that Rodrigo has with King Ferdnando in Granja de Moreruela (Zamora), and imprecisions that deal with the local Palentine traditions that the cantar contains.

Victorio also indicates that, apart from the propagandistic zeal of the diocese of Palencia (where the poem could be drafted, notwithstanding the aforemention of the author's origin) the author shows a convincing political positioning in favor of Peter I the Cruel or the Lawful in the war confronting the candidate of the House of Trastámara, the future Henry II, between the years 1357 and 1369. One could adduce that in the Mocedades that the enemies of the young Rodrigo are the same who, in this conflict contemporary to the author, are enemies to King Peter: the Kingdom of Aragon, the French monarch and the Pope. In this way, the author not only uses this text to promote ecclesiastical interests, but also political.

=== Earlier versions ===
Signs of the existence of material of the Mocedades from the 13th century have been postulated in mentions of narrative elements of the work in chronicles. These appear in the Chronicon mundi, by Luke of Tui, in the History of Spain (also called the First General Chronicle), compiled by Alfonso X the Wise, and in the Chronicle of Twenty Kings. Later, around 1300, in the Chronicle of the Kings of Castile there is found a more complete mention which has a plot of a history missing from the Mocedades. Subsequently, this version gives a new location, with the additional of other epic material, to the one that appears in the Chronicle of 1344. Finally, a priest or educated author would have adapted all this material by around 1360 in the version that is known today.

The narration of the Chronicle of the Kings of Castile, also called the Chronicle of Castile, proses the material of a cantar predecessor to the Mocedades known as "Gesta de las Mocedades de Rodrigo" (which according to Victorio, was adapted in the second half of the 13th century), and this gives origin to the cycle of romances about the youth of Rodrigo. The Gesta differs from the Cantar now preserved in its more moderate tone, with a less rebellious hero, and in which there appear no mention of the history of the diocese of Palencia. This divergence constitutes the principal motif by which Deyermond thought the preserved text would have been composed by an author from this zone.

== Meter ==
The cantar is composed of approximately 30 series of monorhyming heterosyllabic verses which predominate in absolute mode the assonance in á-o, which appear in fifteen series, that is, a total of 972 verses.

The number of verses per series oscillates between the 264 of the number XVII and the two verses from various others (II, V, V, etc.). It is possible that a number of these cases are regarding remains of incomplete series, because the text contains multiple holes.

As in multiple Spanish cantares de gesta, there is no fixed number of syllables for each verse, even though there exists a tendency for these to measure between 14 and 16 metric syllables with a pronounced caesura, that divides the verse in two hemistiches, of which the first tends to be octosyllabic. This feature could indicate its proximity to the meter of the Spanish romances, so the scribe copies the two hemistiches from the same epic verse in each separate line.

== Structure ==
In the text various episodes cross, each only weakly related to the others. The latest of the Hispanic epic poems, it appears to have been the last draft composed from diverse material, in as much chronicles as epics from oral tradition, perhaps even a proto-Spanish romance of El Cid. This is confirmed by the around dozen holes existing within the text, some very notable. In particular, a prominent one causes the interruption of the manuscript, which forces the conjecture of the ending based on the chronicles that transmit earlier versions of the poem.

By this way, there are various plot nuclei: the historical and genealogical introduction in prose, the tale of the most prominent events of the life of the epic hero Fernán González, the episode of the death of the father of Jimena and the arrangement of weddings, the ups and downs on the peninsula, the bellicose feats against Moors (against the Moor Burgos de Ayallón) and Christians (confrontation with the dispatch rider of the king of Aragon). In addition, the text accumulates ecclesiastic affairs of the local environment, how the crypt of Saint Antoninus was found or the relocation of the bishop Bernaldo to his Palentine see, along with military campaigns of universal importance, how the confrontation between Ferdinand and Rodrigo with all the extraparliamentary political powers of the time: king of France, emperor and pope. The concluding feeling is that of finding oneself facing a flood of material due to the multiple drafts of the gesta.

The initial lines of the prosed work are not credited to the author (as indicated by Victorio) instead to the scribe, because this scribe appears to have resumed part of the rhyming text which was being transcribed, and from these there is evidence of the remainders of the assonance that occur in the paragraphs in the prose.

According to Armistead, the ending should be the raising to emperor or "par to emperor" of the King Ferdinand among the other kings of the peninsula. Another possibility, supported by Deyermond, is that the ending is constituted by the homage to Bernaldo once restored to his episcopal see, an episode that goes well with the clerical and publicity character that the poem has according to the theories of the Anglo-Saxon Hispanist.

== Characteristics in relation to medieval Spanish epic ==
=== The Mocedades in the tradition of the cantares de gesta ===
It is strange to prove how a genre like that of the epic poem was maintained, habitually considered to be of traditional gestures and oral diffusion in the early stages of formation of the villages, even in an age as late as the second half of the 14th century. This is a date in which, for example, a Sir Juan Manuel, was fully aware of the literary art, and in which the transmission of news-worthy contents would have already been destined to the prose of chronicles, fundamentally. If this is so, it should be investigated as to what motivated the author to write with an arrangement in the mold of ancient gestas.

Menéndez Pidal indicates to this respect which the public, by already knowing all too well the feats of maturity of the hero, now solicits new discoveries regarding his childhood adventures. In the words of the famous erudite:

Of any hero of primary interest are his most notable actions, those that brought an end during the plentitude [sic] of his strength; but later... this engenders a general curiosity to know a multitude of details that earlier were of no interest... To this curiosity the author of the Mocedades de Rodrigo tried to satisfy.

More than the epic Spanish tradition, universal folkloric motifs contribute to the composition of the Mocedades, in the mode of those that appear in popular oral storytelling, and which have been studied in structuralism and narratology. Moving beyond the aforementioned traditional cliché of the postponed promise, other motifs are found. Among these could be cited that of the fleeing of the prisoner helped by a woman, or of the annual tribute of fifteen noble virgins that are requested of Ferdinand by the pope, emperor and king of France.

On the other hand, due to the influence of foreign epics, the author shows knowledge of the French epic, such as alluding to "Almerique de Narbona", "Los Doçe Pares" or to "Palazin de Blaya", characters of French chansons de geste. By this time, the spreading of material from France was very much extensive throughout the peninsula, as demonstrated in the quantity of characters the epic boasts which appear in the Spanish romances, than this gesta precisely during this time.

=== The nature of the hero ===
In the Mocedades de Rodrigo, the young Cid appears with a very divergent nature that are shown in other versions of his legend, particularly to that of Cantar de mio Cid, where he habitually conducts himself with exquisite restraint. In text in question, he is seen as an arrogant, pompous and proud boy, including on occasions being disrespectful to his king Ferdinand. One example is the first occasion in which they meet. The king had summoned Rodrigo and his father, Diego Laínez, to propose for Rodrigo to bury the death of Jimena's father with the matrimony. But Rodrigo distrusts:

"Listen, sayth I, friends, relatives and vassals of my father:

Guardeth thine Lord without deceit and without skill, If thou wish for the bailiff to apprehend him, for much would he want to kill him, How black a day findeth the king like the others that are there! Thou cannot say traitors for thou killeth the king..."

Mocedades de Rodrigo, vv. 410-414

And later on (vv.422-429) he refuses, in presence of the king, to recognize himself as the king's vassal and to kiss his hand, saying "because thou, my father, I am spoiled" (v. 429). In addition, he audaciously responds in a defiant way to the Pope (vv. 1100–1116), when the Pope asks king Ferdinand if he would like to be invested "emperor of Spain" (v. 1108). It is then shown how Rodrigo steps forward, without letting his king respond first, for whom it corresponds by protocol:

Here spoke Ruy Díaz, before the king Sir Ferdinand:

"Thou giveth God bad thanks, oh Roman pope! We have come for that which is to be won, not that which is already won, Since the five kingdoms of Spain without you already kiss his hand: It remains to conquer the empire of Germany, which by right must be inherited."

Mocedades de Rodrigo, vv. 410-414

In this characterization the novelistic (and not so much epic) will is probably influenced to attract the public with the surprise, the immoderation and the running wild of imagination, appropriate for the development of fiction in the 14th century.

Juan Victorio, in his prologue in the edition cited, thinks, nevertheless, there are precedents when the cliché of the rebelliousness of the hero in all Spanish epics, along the lines of the nature these show with respect to his king the most important episodes of the legend of Bernardo del Carpio or of Fernán González. This is, besides, one of the most abundant motifs in the heroes of Spanish romances.

== Valuation ==
Traditionally, the Mocedades have come to be considered as a hardly relevant text considering its strictly literary value. However, from a point of view of the history of literature, it is an extraordinarily interesting text.

To start with this is because, as mentioned earlier, it is regarding the latest realization of the medieval Spanish epic, and so, this constitutes that the archaic style of the epic endured up to the closing of the 14th century, and its linguistic stereotypes should be valued very carefully in terms of the dating of these works.

On the other hand, it is regarding a text that generates the tradition of romances about the youth of El Cid, and one of its episodes, such as the death of the father of Jimena at the hands of the hero, gave origins by way of the Spanish romances to the work from Guillén de Castro, Las Mocedades del Cid and this, in turn, to the drama from Corneille, Le Cid.

The Mocedades is the last surviving example of Spanish chanson de gesta. From its breakdown were born, according to all indications, the romances. This text is close to those works in its novelistic and imaginative nature and in the majority amount of octosyllabic hemistiches of which the poem is formed. With merely placing the verses in two lines, one per hemistich, and taking into account the fragmentation and holes that the Mocedades contains, the nature of the Spanish romance is well explained, with assonance rhyming in the pairs of octosyllables, the beginning in medias res and ending interruptions, in addition to an elevated component of novelistic fiction in the recreation of historic events.

== Editions of the Mocedades de Rodrigo ==
=== Manuscripts ===
- Manuscript number 12 of Spanish form, in National Library of Paris, olim Cod. 9988 Bibliothèque Royale

=== Modern editions ===
- Francisque Michel and J.F. Wolf, in Wiener Jahrbücher für Literatur, Vienna, 1846.
- Agustín Durán, Biblioteca de Autores Españoles (BAE), volume 16, 1851.
- Damas Hinard, in Poëme du Cid, Paris, 1858 (from the verse 294 in the edition cited below from Victorio).
- A.M. Huntington (edition facsimile), New York, 1904.
- B.P. Bourland, in Revue Hispanique, 24 (I), 1911, pp. 310–357. (with the title Rhyming Chronicle of El Cid)
- Ramón Menéndez Pidal, in Reliquias de la poesía épica española, Madrid, Espasa-Calpe, 1951, pp. 257–289.(entitled Cantar de Rodrigo y el rey Fernando, this text was taken as a basis for many of the later editions, such as that of Carlos Alvar and Manuel Alvar, op. cit. infra.).
- A.D. Deyermond (paleographic edition) in Epic Poetry and the Clergy: Studies on the "Mocedades de Rodrigo", London, Tamesis Books, 1969.
- Juan Victorio, Madrid, Espasa-Calpe, 1982.
- Leonardo Funes con Felipe Tenenbaum, eds. Mocedades de Rodrigo: Estudio y edición de los tres estados del texto, Woodbridge, Tamesis, 2004.
- Matthew Bailey, ed. & translator, Las Mocedades de Rodrigo, The Youthful Deeds of Rodrigo, the Cid, Toronto, University of Toronto Press, 2007.
