= Libro de Apolonio =

The Libro de Apolonio (Book of Apollonius) is an anonymous work of medieval Spanish literature written in Alexandrine quatrains around the middle of the thirteenth century in the learned genre of the Mester de clerecía. It is based on the medieval Latin Historia Apolonii Regis Tyrii.
