= Berdejo =

- municipality
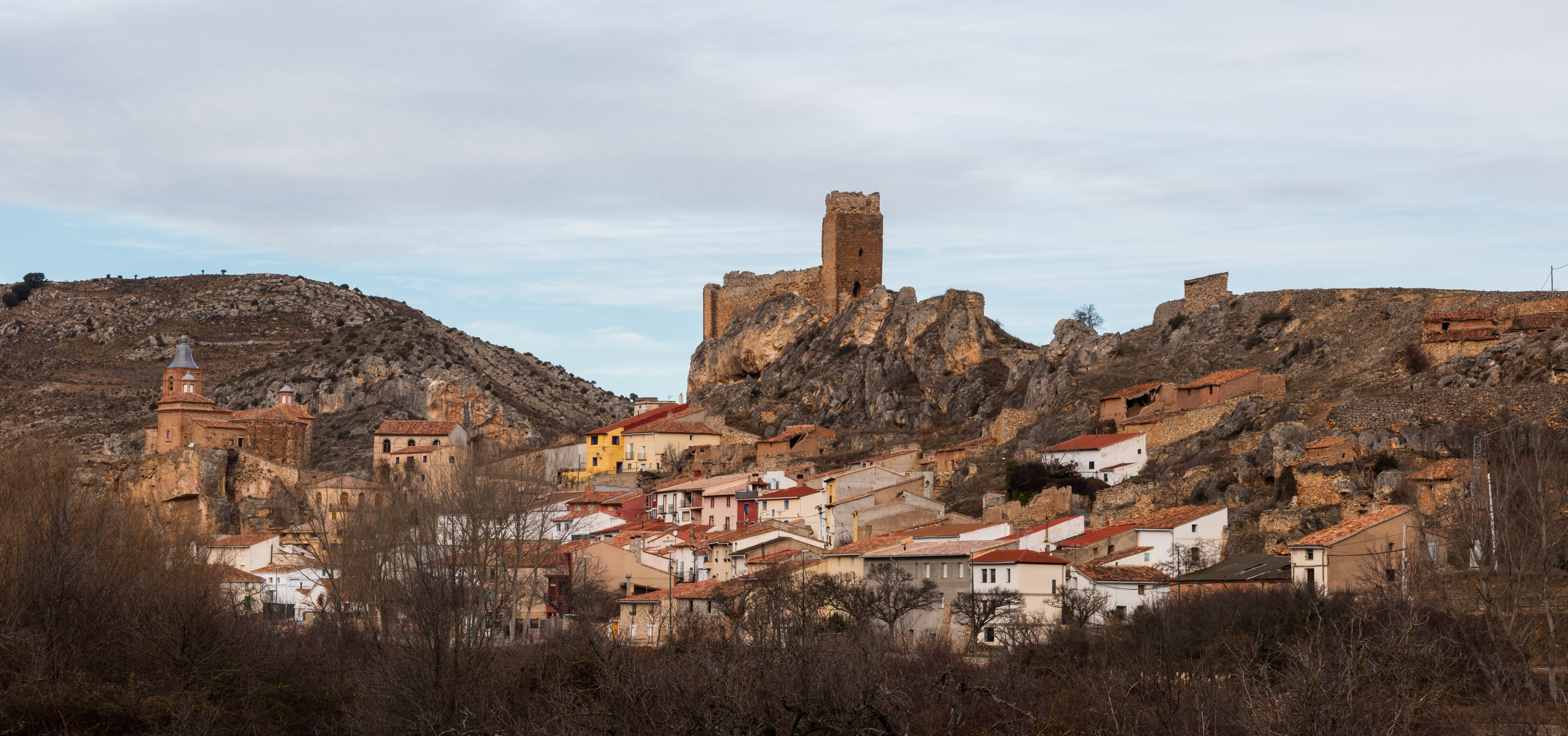

- Location within Aragon Location within Spain Location within Europe
- Country: Spain
- Autonomous community: Aragon
- Province: Zaragoza

Area
  - Total: 19.46 km^{2} (7.51 sq mi)
- Elevation: 990 m (3,250 ft)

Population (2025-01-01)
  - Total: 40
  - Density: 2.1/km^{2} (5.3/sq mi)
- Time zone: UTC+1 (CET)
  - Summer (DST): UTC+2 (CEST)

Berdejo is a municipality located in the province of Zaragoza, Aragon, Spain. According to the 2004 census (INE), the municipality had a population of 66 inhabitants.

== Geography ==
In ancient times, Berdejo was known by the names of Berdeio or Vergegium, which has led to the mistake of the birthplace of San Millán with Berceo. The municipality is crossed by the Manubles, a tributary of the Jalón River. From his church was San Millán priest about the year 560, when Torrelapaja was a district of Berdejo. Today the Church of San Millán is framed in the Arciprestazgo del Alto Jalón of the diocese of Tarazona. It is connected through the A-1502 road.

== See also ==
- List of municipalities in Zaragoza
