= Mester de Juglaría =

Spanish literature genre from the 12th and 13th centuries

Mester de juglaría ("Ministry of jongleury") is a Spanish literature genre from the 12th and 13th centuries, comprising oral poetry performed by "juglares". Examples include epics such as the Cantar de mio Cid and ballads in the romancero tradition. Mester de juglaría has generally been contrasted with the genre of Mester de clerecía, comprising the literary poetry written by clerics. Compared to the poets of the Mester de Clerecía, juglares were uneducated, dealt with popular topics, and used simple language and irregular metric forms. However, in the twentieth century, critics began to question the rigid distinction between these two genres.

According to Ramón Menéndez Pidal, in his study of the poetry of juglares and the origins of romantic literature (Madrid 1957), the word juglar comes from the Latin jocularis, joculator, and it signifies "joker, or man of jokes." The word mester is said to derive from Latin ministerium, meaning "minister" and, at that time, "official."

== Juglares ==
Juglares made their living by reciting and singing stories to entertain the nobility and the general public. They also engaged in circus acts like juggling, tightrope walking, and acrobatics, or acted as clowns who told jokes or played instruments, or danced and sang versions of mime or puppet pieces. They performed both in public places, such as town squares, and in castles of feudal lords.

There were two types of juglares: epic juglares, who recited narrative poetry, and lyrical juglares, who dedicated themselves to the cultivation of sentimental poetry and performed poetic compositions such as serenades, couplets, songs of troubadours, etc. From the 10th to 13th centuries, the former type were more numerous, whereas the latter half of the 13th century to the 14th century were dominated by the latter type.

According to Menéndez Pidal, there were different specializations. There was the remedador who was dedicated to imitation; the cazurro who practiced the plebeian arts; the juglar de gesta, the goliardo, somewhere between student and vagabond, who understood musical instruments and how to compose for them. Also included in the word is the concept of a musician, the types of which were quite diverse, from tavern singers and the richly adorned ones who sang in palaces and accompanied nobles on voyages, to those who sang and played dramas in churches with all sorts of musical instruments (the flute, the dulcimer, the drum, and handheld stringed instruments like the vihuela or the rabel).

== Origins and transmission ==
Although some juglares composed their own lyrics, generally they repeated lyrics by other people. These anonymous stories were mostly cantar de gesta. Although versified to make them easier to memorize, juglares probably often changed the story a little bit as they passed it to others.

There are competing theories regarding the origin of these texts. The individualist theory states that these texts were the creation of one poet and they didn't change much. The traditionalist theory says that they were a collective work of the public and were totally changed as they were transmitted.

== Examples ==
Noted examples of works that can be classified as Mester de Juglaría are El Cantar de mio Cid and Representación de los Reyes Magos.
