= Poema de Fernán González =

- Poem of Fernán González
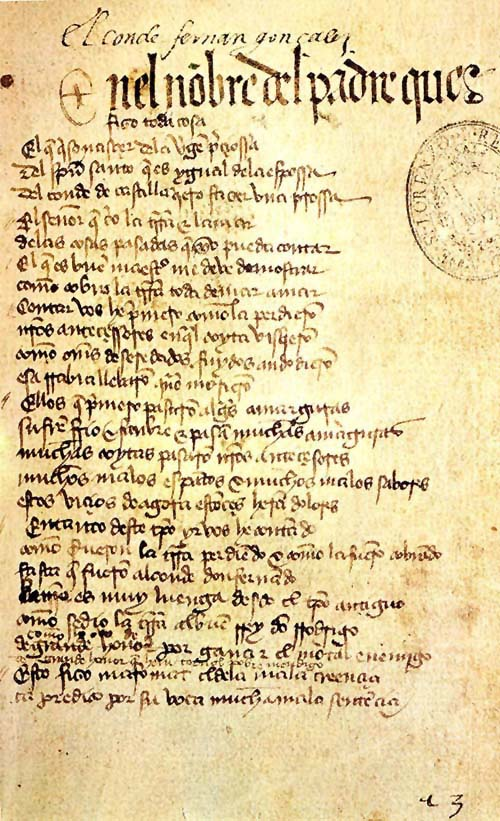
- First page of the manuscript
- Also known as: Cantar de Fernán González; Lay of Fernán González
- Author(s): unknown
- Language: Old Spanish
- Date: 1250–66
- Manuscript(s): Biblioteca de El Escorial, IV-B-21 (unique)
- Genre: epic poetry
- Verse form: cuaderna vía
- Length: 3048 verses in 762 strophes

The Poema de Fernán González is a Castilian epic poem, specifically, a cantar de gesta of the Mester de Clerecía. Composed in a metre called the cuaderna vía, it narrates the deeds of the historical Count of Castile, Fernán González. It was written between 1250 and 1266 by a monk of San Pedro de Arlanza. In 1960 a fourteenth-century Arab roofing tile was discovered in Merindad de Sotoscueva north of Burgos that had some verses of the poem scrawled on it in Old Spanish. It is the oldest copy of (a part of) the work.

The poem reiterates the campaigns of Fernán González against the Moors, his wars against the Kingdom of Navarre, his debates with the King of León, and his protection of San Pedro de Arlanza, where he was eventually buried. Fernán's ability to keep Castile out of the reach of the Moors, however, is most heavily stressed. The poem is designed to present Fernán as the legitimate ruler of all Spain and thus justify Castilian supremacy in the poet's own day. The opening lines express the poet's own desire:

En el nonbre del Padre
que fizo toda cosa,
el que quiso nasçer
de la Virgen preçiossa,
del Spiritu Santo que es
ygual de la espossa,
del conde de Castilla quiero
façer vna prossa.

Translation:

In the name of the Father
who made everything,
[of] he who wished to be born
of the precious Virgin,
[and] of the Holy Ghost who is
equal those already mentioned,
about the count of Castile I wish
to make a prose song.

Despite this strong ideological bent, the author was not well aware of the historical details. Very little about Fernán González has been conserved in writing and most of the stories about him were transmitted orally, developing into legend in the process. The Poema itself is conserved in only one fifteenth-century manuscript, where the mentality and language of the work attest to its thirteenth-century origins.

== Text ==
- Complete text at La Manticora: Revista de Textos Medievales.

== Bibliography ==
- Avalle-Arce, Juan B. "El Poema de Fernan González: Clerecía y juglaría." Philological Quarterly, Vol. 1, No. 51 (Jan., 1972), pp. 60–74.
- Chalon, Louis. "L'effondrement de l'Epagne visigothique et l'invasion musulmane selon le Poema de Fernán González." Anuario de estudios medievales, Vol. 9 (1974–79), pp. 351–362.
- Duque, Adriano. Política y memoria en el Poema de Fernán González. Newark: Juan de la Cuesta, 2017.
- García de la Fuente, O. "Estudio del léxico bíblico del Poema de Fernán González." Analecta Malacitana, Vol. 1 (1978), pp. 5–68.
- Garrido Moraga, A. M. "Ensayo de ordenación conceptual del léxico en el Poema de Fernán González," parts I–III. Analecta Malacitana, Vol. 8–9 (1985–86).
- Garrido Moraga, A. M. "El Poema de Fernán González como objeto semiótico." Analecta Malacitana, Vol. 9 (1986), pp. 265–280.
- Gimeno Casalduero, Joaquín. "Sobre la composición del Poema de Fernán González." Anuario de estudios medievales, Vol. 5 (1968), pp. 181–207.
- Goldberg, Harriet. "The Dream Report as a Literary Device in Medieval Hispanic Literature." Hispania, Vol. 66, No. 1. (Mar., 1983), pp. 21–31.
- Harvey, L. P.; Hook, David. "The Affair of the Horse and Hawk in the Poema de Fernán González." The Modern Language Review, Vol. 77, No. 4. (Oct., 1982), pp. 840–847.
- Keller, J. P. "Inversion of the Prison Episodes in the Poema de Fernán González." Hispanic Review, Vol. 22, No. 4. (Oct., 1954), pp. 253–263.
- Keller, J. P. "The Hunt and Prophecy Episode of the Poema de Fernán González." Hispanic Review, Vol. 23, No. 4. (Oct., 1955), pp. 251–258.
- Keller, J. P. "The Structure of the Poema de Fernán González." Hispanic Review, Vol. 25, No. 4. (Oct., 1957), pp. 235–246.
- Terry, Helen V. "The Treatment of the Horse and Hawk Episodes in the Literature of Fernán González." Hispania, Vol. 13, No. 6. (Dec., 1930), pp. 497–504.
