= Gonzalo de Berceo =

Spanish Castilian priest and poet

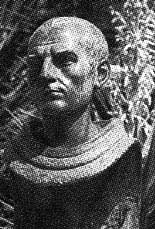
Gonzalo de Berceo

Gonzalo de Berceo (c. 1197 – before 1264) was a Spanish poet born in the Riojan village of Berceo, close to the major Benedictine monastery of San Millán de la Cogolla. He is celebrated for his poems on religious subjects, written in a style of verse which has been called Mester de Clerecía, shared with more secular productions such as the Libro de Alexandre, the Libro de Apolonio. Berceo wrote in the Old Riojan dialect.

Gonzalo is recorded as being a deacon in his home parish in the early 1220s, and as a priest from 1237 on. It has been surmised that he may have studied in the nascent university of Palencia, and may have served in the curia of the bishop of Calahorra.

He wrote devotional and theological works. The devotional may be divided into two sub-sections: the Marian (the long Milagros de Nuestra Señora (Miracles of Our Lady - perhaps influenced by Gautier de Coincy), the Duelo de la Virgen (the Duel of the Virgin, a dialogue between the Blessed Virgin Mary and Saint Bernard of Clairvaux) and Loores de la Virgen (the Praises of the Virgin, which is a type of salvation history); and the hagiographical (the Vida de San Millán de la Cogolla, Vida de Santo Domingo de Silos and the Vida de Santa Oria: the lives of Aemilian of la Cogolla, Dominic of Silos, and Aurea (Oria)). These three saints have a strong regional attachment: Aemilian, a Visigothic saint, was patron of the nearby monastery; Dominic, 11th century abbot of Silos and one of the most important saints in thirteenth-century Iberia, was born in the town of Cañas, near to Berceo; and Aurea was an anchoress who lived in the monastery of San Millán during the late eleventh century. He also wrote the fragmentary Martirio de San Lorenzo (the Martyrdom of Saint Lawrence, a Roman martyr of the third century), which may be connected to a shrine of Saint Lawrence supposedly built by Aemilian himself, at the top of the mountain below which the monastery of San Millán is situated.

The theological works are the Del sacrificio de la misa (On the Sacrifice of the Mass), a verse-compendium of the significance of the priest's actions during the eucharist; and Los signos del juicio final (the Signs of the Last Judgement), a description of the prodigies that will be witnessed before the return of Christ to judge the living and the dead.

His proximity to San Millán and his composition of hagiographies which seem to support the monastery's interests, have led him to be considered a propagandist for the narrow interests of the monastery of San Millán. This view has been propounded above all by Professor Brian Dutton, editor of Gonzalo de Berceo's collected works, although some critics (notably Fernando Baños and Isabel Uría Maqua) have taken a view which presents the poet as less motivated by his concerns for the monastery; others (particularly Gregory Andrachuk) have linked him to the Lateran reforms.
