= Old Spanish =

Medieval form of the Spanish language, initially was Vulgar Latin

- Old Castilian
- roman, romançe, romaz
- Native to: Crown of Castile
- Region: Iberian Peninsula
- Ethnicity: Castilians, later Spaniards
- Era: 9th–15th centuries
- Language family: Indo-European: Italic; Latino-Faliscan; Latin; Romance; Italo-Western; Western Romance; Gallo-Iberian; Ibero-Romance; West Iberian; Castilian; Old Spanish
- Early forms: Old Latin: Vulgar Latin; Proto-Romance
- Writing system: Latin; Aljamiado (marginal)

Language codes
- ISO 639-3: osp
- Glottolog: olds1249

Old Spanish (roman, romançe, romaz; Spanish: español antiguo), also known as Old Castilian or Medieval Spanish, refers to the varieties of Ibero-Romance spoken predominantly in Castile and environs during the Middle Ages. The earliest and most famous literary composition in Old Spanish is the Cantar de mio Cid (c. 1140–1207).

== Phonology ==
=== Vowels ===
==== Monophthongs ====
	Front	Central	Back
Close	i		u
Mid	e		o
Open		a	

==== Diphthongs ====
/i̯e/	/u̯e/

=== Consonants ===
Penny (2002:96)
		Labial	Dental	(Denti-)Alveolar	(Pre-)Palatal		Velar
Nasal		m		n	ɲ		
Stop/Affricate	voiceless	p	t	t͡s	t͡ʃ		k
Stop/Affricate	voiced	b	d	d͡z			ɡ
Fricative	voiceless			s	ʃ		h
Fricative	voiced	β		z	ʒ	ʝ	
Lateral				l	ʎ		
Trill				r			
Flap				ɾ			

(/s/ and /z/ were apico-alveolar.)

==== /b/ and /β/ ====
These were still distinct phonemes in Old Spanish, judging by the consistency with which the graphemes ⟨b⟩ and ⟨v⟩ were distinguished. (Note: In general ⟨b⟩ for the reflex of Classical Latin initial /b/ or intervocalic /p/ and ⟨v⟩ for the reflex of Classical Latin /w/ or intervocalic /b/.) Nevertheless, the two could be confused in consonant clusters (as in alba~alva “dawn”) or in word-initial position, perhaps after /n/ or a pause. /b/ and /β/ appear to have merged in word-initial position by about 1400 and in all other environments by the mid–late 16th century at the latest.

==== /h/ ====
At an archaic stage, the realizations of /h/ (from Latin /f/) would have been approximately as follows:

- [ɸ] before [i e a] or [j ɾ l]
- [h] (Note: developed from older [ɸ] via dissimilation before rounded vowels) before [o] or [u]
- [ʍ] or [hɸ] before [w]

By early Old Spanish, [ɸ] had been replaced with [h] before all vowels and possibly before [j] as well.

In later Old Spanish, surviving [ɸ] and [ʍ]/[hɸ] were modified to [f] in urban speech, likely due to the influx of numerous French and Occitan speakers (and their particular pronunciation of Latin) beginning in the twelfth century. Various words with [f] were then borrowed into Spanish, leading to minimal pairs like [ˈfoɾma] “form” (a borrowing) and [ˈhoɾma] “shoemaker's last” (inherited from Latin forma). The result was a new phoneme /f/, distinct from /h/.

==== /ʒ/ ====
Possibly realized as [d͡ʒ] after pauses or certain consonants (judging by outcomes in Judeo-Spanish).

==== Development of sibilants to modern Spanish ====
1. /t͡s d͡z/ deaffricated to /s̻ z̻/. (Note: Laminodental and therefore still distinct from apicoalveolar /s z/. Cf. the similar contrasts in Basque and Mirandese.)
2. /z̻ z ʒ/ devoiced and merged into /s̻ s ʃ/. (Note: Still allophonically voiced before voiced consonants, as in [ˈmizmo].)
3. /ʃ/ was retracted to /x/.
4. /s̻/ (depending on dialect) merged into /s/ or fronted to /θ/.

== Orthography ==
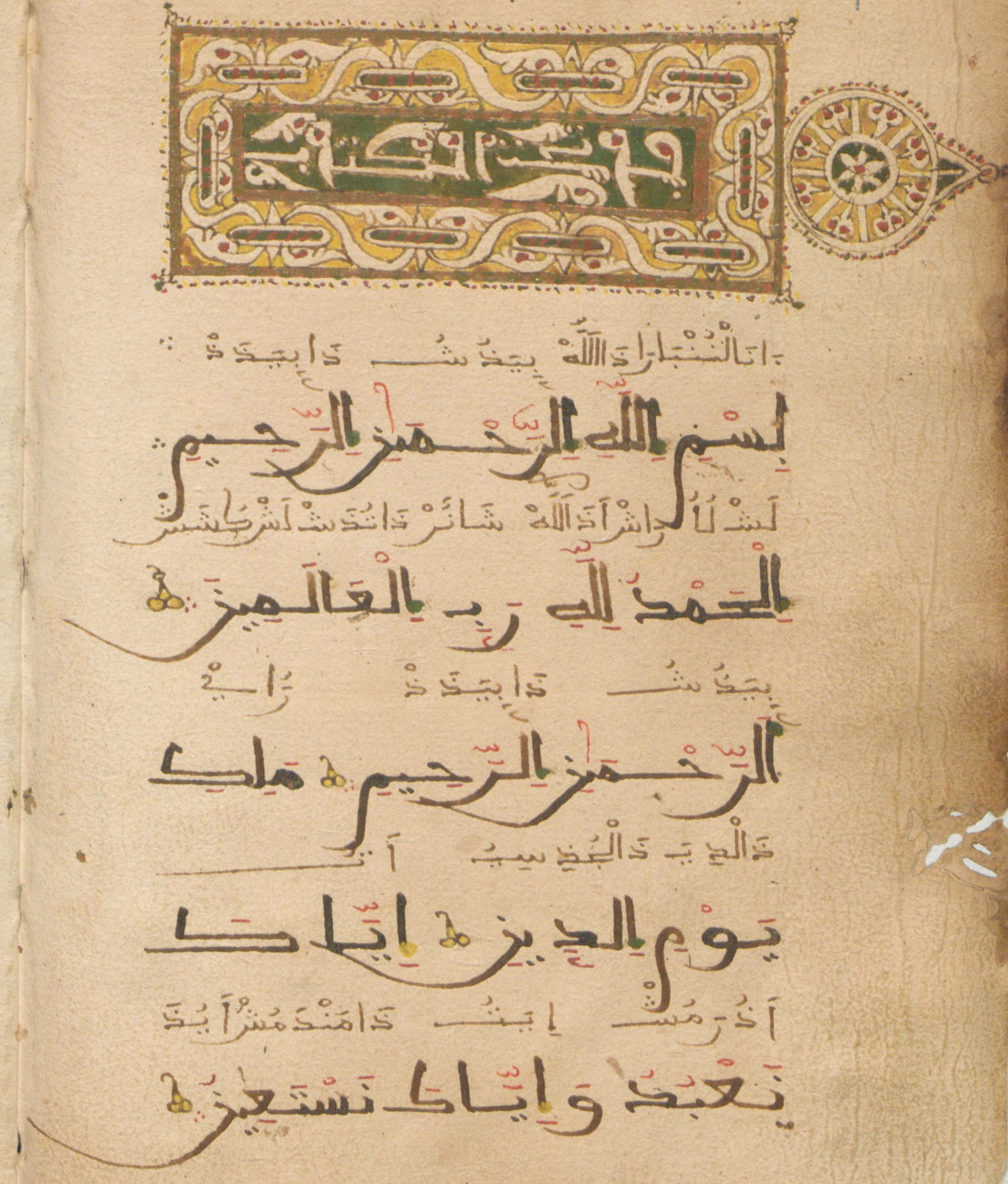
Al-Fatiha with Spanish translations in Aljamiado script above each line of Arabic Quranic text

=== Scripts ===
Old Spanish was generally written in some variation of the Latin script. It was also sometimes written in Arabic script in a practice called Aljamía.

=== /ɲ ʎ/ ===
These sounds were spelt ⟨nn⟩ and ⟨ll⟩ respectively. (Note: Continuing the spellings of Latin /nn/ and /ll/, which were in many cases the origin of Old Spanish /ɲ/ and /ʎ/.) ⟨nn⟩ was often abbreviated to ⟨ñ⟩, which went on to become the normal spelling of /ɲ/ in Modern Spanish.

==== Graeco-Latin digraphs ====
Old Spanish featured the digraphs ⟨ch⟩, ⟨ph⟩, ⟨(r)rh⟩, and ⟨th⟩ which were simplified to ⟨c⟩, ⟨f⟩, ⟨(r)r⟩, ⟨t⟩ in Modern Spanish. Examples include:

- christiano (modern cristiano)
- triumpho (modern triunfo)
- myrrha (modern mirra)
- theatro (modern teatro)

==== ⟨y⟩ ====
⟨y⟩ often stood for /i/ in word-initial position. In this context it has since been respelt to ⟨i⟩ in Modern Spanish.

==== Sibilants ====
(The following table does not account for sandhi contexts.)

consonant	spelling	context
/t͡s/	⟨ç⟩	any
/t͡s/	⟨c⟩	before ⟨e⟩ or ⟨i⟩
/t͡s/	⟨z⟩	final
/t͡s/	⟨z⟩	before a voiceless consonant
/d͡z/	⟨z⟩	before a voiced consonant
/d͡z/	⟨z⟩	initial
/d͡z/	⟨z⟩	intervocalic
/s/	⟨ss⟩	intervocalic
/s/	⟨s⟩	initial
/s/	⟨s⟩	before a voiceless consonant
/z/	⟨s⟩	before a voiced consonant
/z/	⟨s⟩	intervocalic
/ʃ/	⟨x⟩	any
/ʃ/	⟨i⟩ (Note: ⟨j⟩ in modernized spelling)	final
/ʒ/	⟨i⟩	before a vowel
/ʒ/	⟨g⟩	before ⟨e⟩ or ⟨i⟩
/t͡ʃ/	⟨ch⟩	any

== Morphology ==
In Old Spanish, perfect constructions of movement verbs, such as ir ('(to) go') and venir ('(to) come'), were formed using the auxiliary verb ser ('(to) be'), as in Italian and French: Las mugieres son llegadas a Castiella was used instead of Las mujeres han llegado a Castilla ('The women have arrived in Castile').

Possession was expressed with the verb aver (Modern Spanish haber, '(to) have'), rather than tener: Pedro ha dos fijas was used instead of Pedro tiene dos hijas ('Pedro has two daughters').

In the perfect tenses, the past participle often agreed with the gender and number of the direct object: María ha cantadas dos canciones was used instead of Modern Spanish María ha cantado dos canciones ('María has sung two songs'). However, that was inconsistent even in the earliest texts.

The prospective aspect was formed with the verb ir ('(to) go') along with the verb in infinitive, with the difference that Modern Spanish includes the preposition a:

Al Çid beso la mano, la senna ua tomar. (Cantar de mio Cid, 691)
Al Cid besó la mano, la enseña va a tomar. (Modern Spanish equivalent)

Personal pronouns and substantives were placed after the verb in any tense or mood unless a stressed word was before the verb.

The future and the conditional tenses were not yet fully grammaticalised as inflections; rather, they were still periphrastic formations of the verb aver in the present or imperfect indicative followed by the infinitive of a main verb. Pronouns, therefore, by the general placement rules, could be inserted between the main verb and the auxiliary in these periphrastic tenses, as still occurs with Portuguese (mesoclisis):

E dixo: ― Tornar-m-é a Jherusalem. (Fazienda de Ultra Mar, 194)
Y dijo: ― Me tornaré a Jerusalén. (literal translation into Modern Spanish)
E disse: ― Tornar-me-ei a Jerusalém. (literal translation into Portuguese)
And he said: "I will return to Jerusalem." (English translation)

En pennar gelo he por lo que fuere guisado (Cantar de mio Cid, 92)
Se lo empeñaré por lo que fuere razonable (literal translation into Modern Spanish)
Penhorar-lho-ei pelo que for razoável (literal Modern Portuguese equivalent)
I will pawn them it for whatever it be reasonable (English translation)

When there was a stressed word before the verb, the pronouns would go before the verb: non gelo empeñar he por lo que fuere guisado.

Generally, an unstressed pronoun and a verb in simple sentences combined into one word. In a compound sentence, the pronoun was found in the beginning of the clause: la manol va besar = la mano le va a besar.

The future subjunctive was in common use (fuere in the second example above) but it is generally now found only in legal or solemn discourse and in the spoken language in some dialects, particularly in areas of Venezuela, to replace the imperfect subjunctive. It was used similarly to its Modern Portuguese counterpart, in place of the modern present subjunctive in a subordinate clause after si, cuando etc., when an event in the future is referenced:

Si vos assi lo fizieredes e la ventura me fuere complida
Mando al vuestro altar buenas donas e ricas (Cantar de mio Cid, 223–224)

Si vosotros así lo hiciereis y la ventura me fuere cumplida,
Mando a vuestro altar ofrendas buenas y ricas (Modern Spanish equivalent)

Se vós assim o fizerdes e a ventura me for cumprida,
Mando a vosso altar oferendas boas e ricas. (Portuguese equivalent.)

If you do so and fortune is favourable toward me,
I will send to your altar fine and rich offerings (English translation)

== Vocabulary ==
Latin	Old Spanish	Modern Spanish	Modern Portuguese
acceptāre, captāre, effectum, respectum	acetar, catar, efeto, respeto	aceptar, captar, efecto, respecto, respeto	aceitar, captar, efeito, respeito
et, nōn, nōs, hīc	e, et; non, no; nós; í	y, e; no; nosotros; ahí	e; não; nós; aí
stābat; habuī, habēbat; facere, fecisti	estava; ove, avié; far/fer/fazer, fezist(e)/fizist(e)	estaba; hube, había; hacer, hiciste	estava; houve, havia; fazer, fizeste
hominem, mulierem, īnfantem	omne/omre/ombre, mugier/muger, ifante	hombre, mujer, infante	homem, mulher, infante
crās, māne (māneāna); numquam	cras, man, mañana; nunqua/nunquas	mañana, nunca	manhã, nunca
quandō, quid, quī (quem), quōmodo	quando, que, qui, commo/cuemo	cuando, que, quien, como	quando, que, quem, como
fīlia	fyia, fija	hija	filha

== Sample text ==
The following is a sample from Cantar de Mio Cid (lines 330–365), with abbreviations resolved, punctuation (the original has none), and some modernized letters. Below is the original Old Spanish text in the first column, along with the same text in Modern Spanish in the second column and an English translation in the third column.

=== The poem ===
Old Spanish	Modern Spanish	English Translation
Ya sennor glorioso, padre que en çielo estas,	Oh Señor glorioso, Padre que en el cielo estás,	O glorious Lord, Father who art in Heaven,
Fezist çielo e tierra, el terçero el mar,	Hiciste el cielo y la tierra, al tercer día el mar,	Thou madest Heaven and Earth, and on the third day the sea,
Fezist estrelas e luna, e el sol pora escalentar,	Hiciste las estrellas y la luna, y el sol para calentar,	Thou madest the stars and the Moon, and the Sun for warmth,
Prisist en carnaçion en sancta maria madre,	Te encarnaste en Santa María madre,	Thou incarnatedst Thyself of the Blessed Mother Mary,
En belleem apareçist, commo fue tu veluntad,	En Belén apareciste, como fue tu voluntad,	In Bethlehem Thou appearedst, for it was Thy will,
Pastores te glorificaron, ovieron de a laudare,	Pastores te glorificaron, te tuvieron que loar,	Shepherds glorified Thee, they gave Thee praise,
Tres Reyes de arabia te vinieron adorar,	Tres reyes de Arabia te vinieron a adorar,	Three kings of Arabia came to worship Thee,
Melchior e gaspar e baltasar, oro e tus e mirra	Melchor, Gaspar y Baltasar; oro, incienso y mirra	Melchior, Caspar, and Balthazar; offered Thee
Te offreçieron, commo fue tu veluntad.	Te ofrecieron, como fue tu voluntad.	Gold, frankincense, and myrrh, for it was Thy will.
Saluest a jonas quando cayo en la mar,	Salvaste a Jonás cuando cayó en el mar,	Thou savedst Jonah when he fell into the sea,
Saluest a daniel con los leones en la mala carçel,	Salvaste a Daniel con los leones en la mala cárcel,	Thou savedst Daniel from the lions in the terrible jail,
Saluest dentro en Roma al sennor san sabastián,	Salvaste dentro de Roma al señor San Sebastián,	Thou savedst Saint Sebastian in Rome,
Saluest a sancta susanna del falso criminal,	Salvaste a Santa Susana del falso criminal,	Thou savedst Saint Susan from the false charge,
Por tierra andidiste xxxii annos, sennor spirital,	Por tierra anduviste treinta y dos años, Señor espiritual,	On Earth Thou walkedst thirty-two years, Spiritual Lord,
Mostrando los miraculos, por en auemos que fablar,	Mostrando los milagros, por ende tenemos qué hablar,	Performing miracles, thus we have of which to speak,
Del agua fezist vino e dela piedra pan,	Del agua hiciste vino y de la piedra pan,	Of the water Thou madest wine and of the stone bread,
Resuçitest a Lazaro, ca fue tu voluntad,	Resucitaste a Lázaro, porque fue tu voluntad,	Thou revivedst Lazarus, because it was Thy will,
Alos judios te dexeste prender, do dizen monte caluarie	Por los judíos te dejaste prender, en donde llaman Monte Calvario	Thou leftest Thyself to be arrested by the Jews, where they call Mount Calvary,
Pusieron te en cruz, por nombre en golgota,	Te pusieron en la cruz, en un lugar llamado Golgotá,	They placed Thee on the Cross, in the place called Golgotha,
Dos ladrones contigo, estos de sennas partes,	Dos ladrones contigo, estos de sendas partes,	Two thieves with Thee, these of split paths,
El vno es en parayso, ca el otro non entro ala,	Uno está en el paraíso, porque el otro no entró allá,	One is in Paradise, but the other did not enter there,
Estando en la cruz vertud fezist muy grant,	Estando en la cruz hiciste una virtud muy grande,	Being on the Cross Thou didst a very great virtue,
Longinos era çiego, que nuquas vio alguandre,	Longinos era ciego que jamás se vio,	Longinus was blind ever he saw Thee,
Diot con la lança enel costado, dont yxio la sangre,	Te dio con la lanza en el costado, de donde salió la sangre,	He gave Thee a blow with the lance in the broadside, where he left the blood,
Corrio la sangre por el astil ayuso, las manos se ouo de vntar,	Corrió la sangre por el astil abajo, las manos se tuvo que untar,	Running down the arm, the hands Thou hadst spread,
Alçolas arriba, legolas a la faz,	Las alzó arriba, se las llevó a la cara,	Raised it up, as it led to Thy face,
Abrio sos oios, cato atodas partes,	Abrió sus ojos, miró a todas partes,	Opened their eyes, saw all parts,
En ti crouo al ora, por end es saluo de mal.	En ti creyó entonces, por ende se salvó del mal.	And believed in Thee then, thus saved them from evil.
Enel monumento Resuçitest e fust alos ynfiernos,	En el monumento resucitaste y fuiste a los infiernos,	Thou revivedst in the tomb and went to Hell,
Commo fue tu voluntad,	Como fue tu voluntad,	For it was Thy will,
Quebranteste las puertas e saqueste los padres sanctos.	Quebrantaste las puertas y sacaste a los padres santos.	Thou hast broken the doors and brought out the holy fathers.
Tueres Rey delos Reyes e de todel mundo padre,	Tú eres Rey de los reyes y de todo el mundo padre,	Thou art King of Kings and of all the world Father,
Ati adoro e creo de toda voluntad,	A ti te adoro y en ti creo de toda voluntad,	I worship Thee and I believe in all Thy will,
E Ruego a san peydro que me aiude a Rogar	Y ruego a San Pedro que me ayude a rogar	And I pray to Saint Peter to help with my prayer,
Por mio çid el campeador, que dios le curie de mal,	Por mi Cid el Campeador, que Dios le cuide del mal,	For my Cid the Champion, that God nurse from evil,
Quando oy nos partimos, en vida nos faz iuntar.	Cuando hoy partamos, en vida haznos juntar.	When we part today, that we are joined in this life or the next.

== See also ==
- History of the Spanish language
- Early Modern Spanish (Middle Spanish)
- Judeo-Spanish preserves some of the sounds and terms of Old Spanish that have been lost in Modern Spanish.
- Gramática de la lengua castellana

== Bibliography ==
- Bradley, Travis G.; Lozano, Claire Julia (2022). "Language contact and phonological innovation in the voiced prepalatal obstruents of Judeo-Spanish". Languages. 7 (4): 313. doi:10.3390/languages7040313.
- Eberhard, David M.; Simons, Gary F.; Fennig, Charles D. (2020). Ethnologue: Languages of the World (23rd ed.). Dallas, Texas: SIL International. Archived from the original on 6 April 2006.
- Hualde, José Ignacio (2013). "Intervocalic lenition and word-boundary effects". Diachronica. 30 (2): 232–266. doi:10.1075/dia.30.2.04hua.
- Lloyd, Paul M. (1987). From Latin to Spanish. Philadelphia: American Philosophical Society.
- Penny, Ralph (2002). A History of the Spanish Language (2nd ed.). Cambridge University Press. ISBN 978-0521011846.
