= Cantar de mio Cid =

Castilian epic poem

- Poem of my Cid
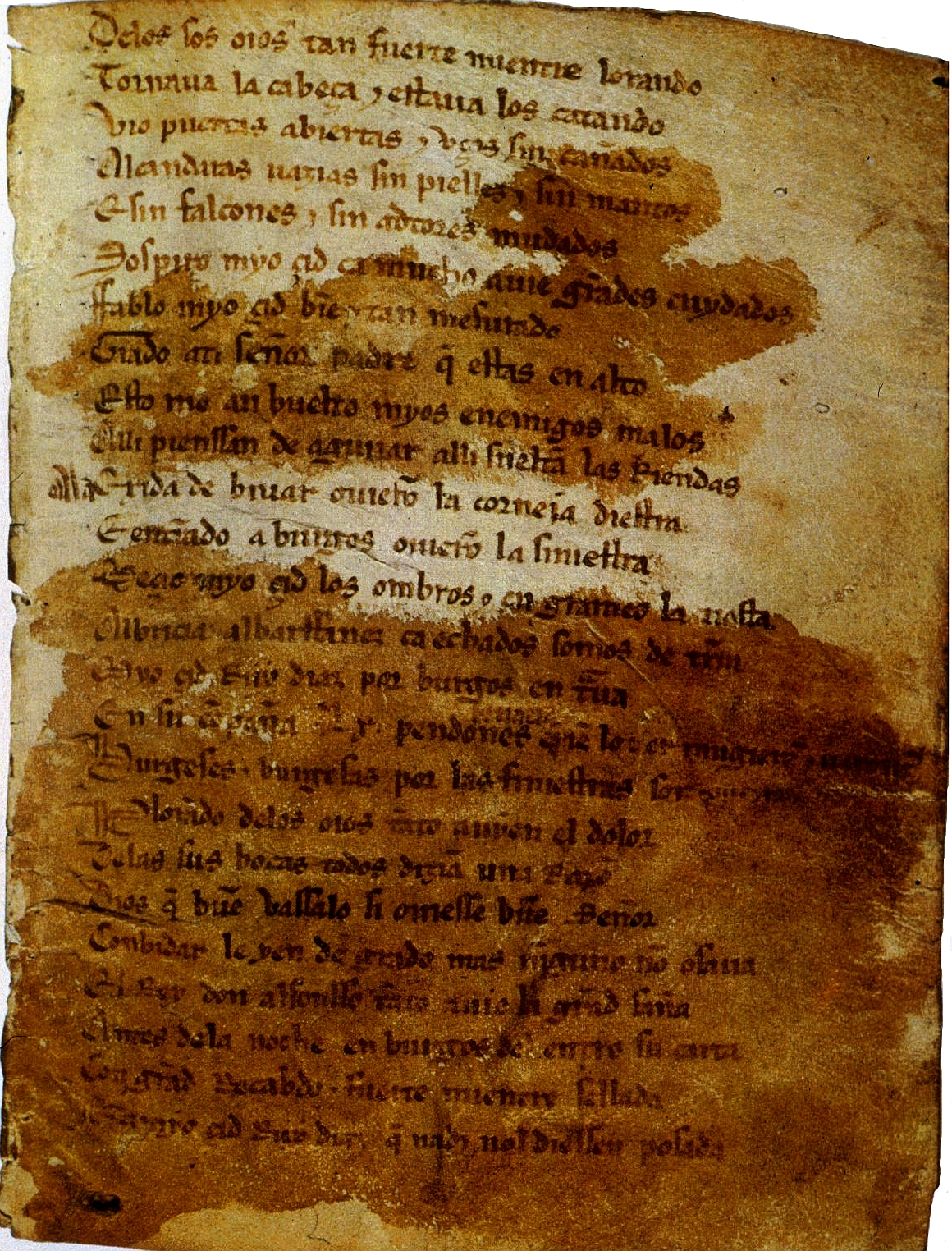
- Also known as: Poema de mio Cid (Poem of my Cid)
- Author(s): Unknown
- Language: Old Spanish
- Date: Composed sometime between 1140 and 1207
- Manuscript(s): Unique manuscript. National Library of Spain, Vitr.7–17.
- Genre: Cantar de gesta
- Verse form: Anisosyllabic with assonant rhyme
- Length: 3730 verses

El Cantar de mio Cid, or El Poema de mio Cid ("The Song of My Cid"; "The Poem of My Cid"), is an anonymous 12th-century cantar de gesta and the oldest preserved Castilian epic poem. Based on a true story, it tells of the deeds of the Castilian hero and knight in medieval Spain Rodrigo Díaz de Vivar—known as El Cid—and takes place during the eleventh century, an era of conflicts in the Iberian Peninsula between the Kingdom of Castile and various Taifa principalities of Al-Andalus. It is considered a national epic of Spain.

The work survives in a medieval manuscript which is now in the Spanish National Library.

== Origin ==
The Spanish medievalist Ramón Menéndez Pidal included the Cantar de mio Cid in the popular tradition he termed the mester de juglaría. Mester de juglaría refers to the medieval tradition according to which popular poems were passed down from generation to generation, being changed in the process. These poems were meant to be performed in public by minstrels (or juglares), who each performed the traditional composition differently according to the performance context—sometimes adding their own twists to the epic poems they told, or abbreviating them according to the situation.

El Cantar de mio Cid shows signs of being designed for oral transmission. For example, the poem ends with a request for wine for the person who has recited it (Es leido, dadnos del vino). On the other hand, some critics (known as individualists) believe El Cantar de mio Cid was composed by one Per Abbad (in English, Abbot Peter) who appears to be credited as the writer of the work in a colophon to the text. It has been suggested that the poem, which is written in Old Spanish, is an example of the learned poetry that was cultivated in the monasteries and other centers of erudition. However, Per Abbad puts the date 1207 after his name and current thinking is that his claim to have written the work has simply been copied along with the text of an earlier manuscript now lost. The existing copy forms part of a 14th-century codex in the Biblioteca Nacional de España (National Library) in Madrid, Spain. It is, however, incomplete, missing the first page and two others in the middle. For the purposes of preservation, it is not normally on display.

There are sources that claim that the song was written several years earlier, considering the historical Cid died in 1099. These, however, recognize that the poem itself would not have been written immediately after the death of its titular hero since the narrative would not have been picked up if the story of the Cid had not yet attained its legendary status. There are those who also take into consideration the emergence of the Carolingian legends, which began after 1100 since it is believed that these stories also influenced the poem. The Poem of the Cid, for example, echoes the plot devices used in The Song of Roland epic.

== Title ==
One of the oldest documents preserved at the Real Academia de la Historia in Madrid presents only this phrase as the poem's title: Hic incipiunt gesta Roderici Campi Docti, which means "Here begin the deeds of Rodrigo the Campeador." Its current title is a 19th-century proposal by Ramón Menéndez Pidal since its original title is unknown. Some merely call the poem El Poema del Cid on the grounds that it is not a cantar but a poem made up of three cantares. The title has been translated into English as The Lay of the Cid and The Song of the Cid. Mio Cid is literally "My Cid", a term of endearment used by the narrator and by characters in the work. The word Cid originates from Arabic sidi or sayyid (سيد), an honorific title similar to English Sir (in the medieval, courtly sense).

The commonly used title El Cantar de mio Cid means literally The Song of my Lord or The Poem of my Lord. As the original title of the poem is lost to history, this one was suggested by historian Ramón Menéndez Pidal. It is Old Spanish (old Castilian), adjusted to modern orthography. In modern Spanish the title might be rendered El Poema de mi Señor or El Poema de mi Jefe. The expression cantar (literally "to sing") was used to mean a chant or a song. The word Cid (Çid in old Spanish orthography), was a derivation of the dialectal Arabic word سيد sîdi or sayyid, which means lord or master. During the period the poem was written, Arabic was still a widely used and highly regarded language in Iberia (hence the fact that modern Spanish still contains many Arabic words). Çid was not a common word, though, in old Spanish and thus can be treated almost as a proper noun.

== The story ==
El Cid married the cousin of King Alfonso VI, Doña Ximena, but for certain reasons (according to the story, he made the king swear by Santa Gadea that he had not ordered the fratricide of his own brother), he fell into the disfavor of the king and had to leave his home country of Castile.

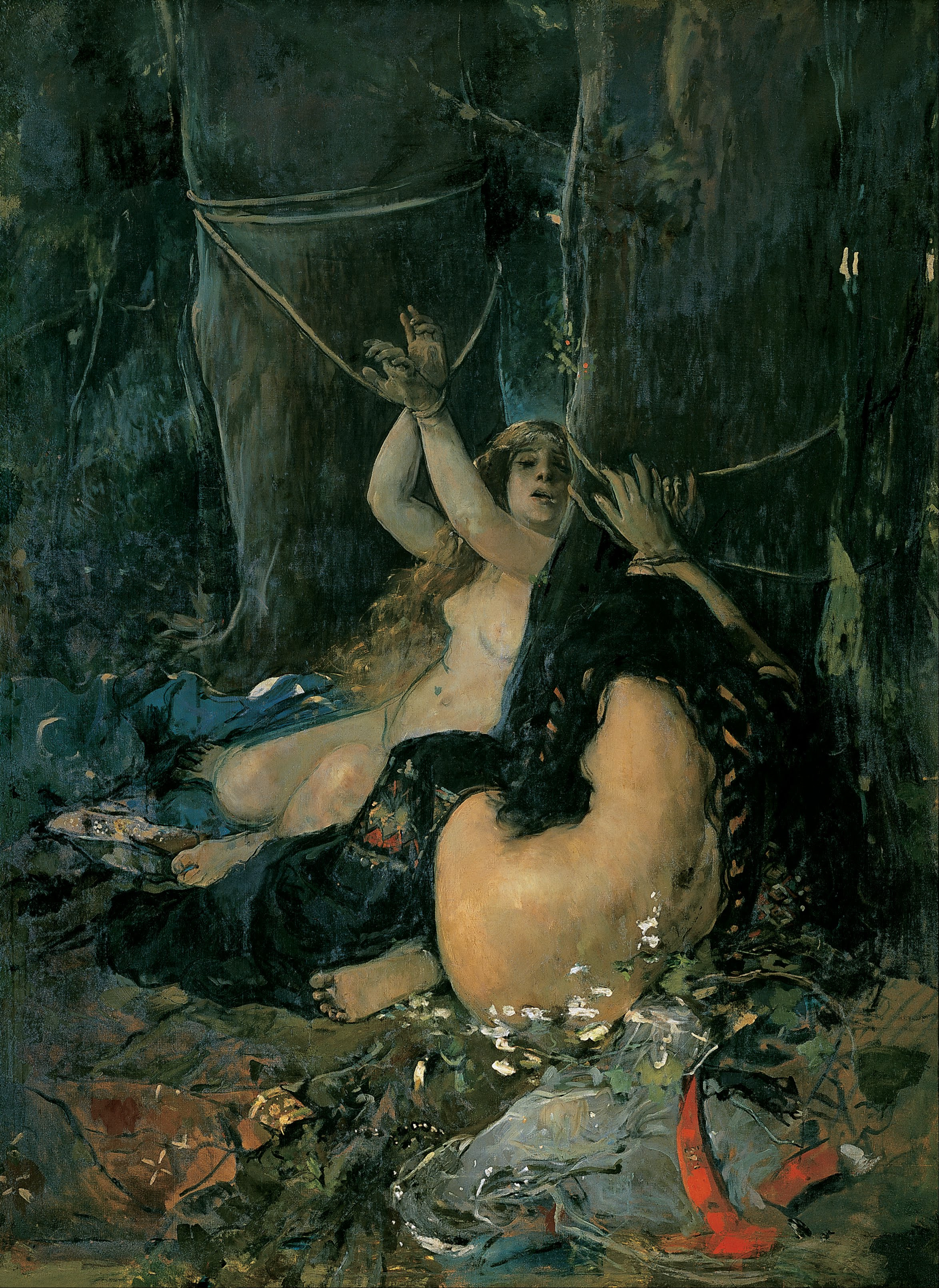
El Cid's daughters after being beaten and tied up, work by Ignacio Pinazo (1879).

The story begins with the exile of El Cid, whose enemies had unjustly accused him of stealing money from the king, Alfonso VI of Castile and León, leading to his exile. To regain his honor, he participated in the battles against the Moorish armies and conquered Valencia. By these heroic acts he regained the confidence of the king and his honor was restored. The king personally marries El Cid's daughters to the infantes (princes) of Carrión. However, when the princes are humiliated by El Cid's men for their cowardice, the infantes swear revenge. They beat their new wives and leave them for dead. When El Cid learns of this he pleads to the king for justice. The infantes are forced to return El Cid's dowry and are defeated in a duel, stripping them of all honor. El Cid's two daughters then remarry to the principes (crown princes) of Navarre and Aragon. Through the marriages of his daughters, El Cid began the unification of Spain.

Unlike other European medieval epics, the tone is realist. There is no magic; even the apparition of archangel Gabriel (verses 404–410) happens in a dream. However, it also departs from historic truth: for example, there is no mention of his son, his daughters were not named Elvira and Sol and they did not become queens.

It consists of more than 3,700 verses of usually 14 through 16 syllables, each with a caesura between the hemistiches. The rhyme is assonant.

Since 1913, and following the work of Ramón Menéndez Pidal, the entire work is conventionally divided into three parts:

=== Cantar del Destierro (verses 1–1086) ===
El Cid is exiled from Castile by King Alfonso VI and fights against the Moors to regain his honor.

Rodrigo Díaz de Vivar is called Mío Cid (meaning My Lord) by the Moors. His current task is to collect the tributes from the Moorish territory owed to his king, Alfonso VI of León. Cid's enemy accuses him of taking some of these tributes and the king exiles him from León and Castile. Before he leaves, he places his wife, Doña Ximena, and his two daughters, Doña Elvira and Doña Sol, in the Monastery of Cardeña. The canto then gives accounts of raids in the Moorish territory in which Cid and his men get rich off of the spoils.

=== Cantar de las bodas de las hijas del Cid (verses 1087–2277) ===
El Cid defends the city of Valencia, defeating King Chufa ibn Tashfin of the Almoravids. El Cid restores his honor and grants his daughters permission to marry the infantes of Carrión.

It begins with Cid's capture of the city of Valencia. He brings his family to live with him. It is discovered that the Infantes (princes) de Carrión, the nephews to the king, are the enemies who caused Cid's exile. They plot to marry his daughters to take some of his wealth. The king acts on behalf of his nephews and pardons Cid and allows the marriages. Cid suspects that something bad will happen from the marriages but he allows it anyway.

=== Cantar de la Afrenta de Corpes (verses 2278–3730) ===
The infantes of Carrión were put to shame after being scared of a lion roaming in the court and running away from a campaign to fight against the Moors. So, in revenge, they decide to abuse and abandon their wives at the roadside in Corpes, tied to trees. Once more, El Cid has to gain his honor back, so he asks the court of Toledo for justice. The infantes are defeated in a duel by El Cid's men, and his daughters remarry to the infantes of Navarra and Aragon.

The Cantar shows that the Infantes are cowards in battles with the Moors. They are made fun of and decide to get revenge by attacking their wives. They set out for Carrión with their wives and an escort, Felix Muñoz, the cousin of the daughters. Once on the journey, they send the escort ahead of them, steal their wives' great dowries (including two beautiful swords) and beat them and leave them for dead. Muñoz suspects trouble and returns to his cousins and takes them to receive help. Cid seeks to right the wrongs done to his daughters, and a trial is held. A duel is held between some of Cid's men and the Infantes in which the Infantes lose. In the middle of the trial, a message is sent from the kings of Navarra and Aragon, proposing to marry their sons to Cid's daughters. These marriages take place after the defeat of the Infantes and near the end of the story.

== Authorship and composition date ==
The linguistic analysis allows the reconstruction of a 12th-century previous text, which Ramón Menéndez Pidal dated circa 1140. Date and authorship are still open to debate. Certain aspects of the conserved text belong to a well-informed author, with precise knowledge of the law in effect by the end of the 12th century and beginning of the 13th, who knew the area bordering with Burgos.

== Extract ==
These are the first two known stanzas. The format has been somewhat regularized (e.g., "mio" for "myo", "rr" for "R", "ñ" for "nn", "llorando" for "lorando", "v" for "u", adding modern punctuation and capitalization):

De los sos oios tan fuertemientre llorando,
Tornava la cabeça e estavalos catando;
Vio puertas abiertas e uços sin cañados,
alcandaras vazias, sin pielles e sin mantos,
e sin falcones e sin adtores mudados.
Sospiro Mio Cid, ca mucho avie grandes cuidados.
Fablo mio Cid bien e tan mesurado:
«¡grado a ti, Señor Padre, que estas en alto!
»Esto me an buelto mios enemigos malos.»

Alli pienssan de aguiiar, alli sueltan las rriendas;
ala exida de Bivar ovieron la corneia diestra
e entrando a Burgos ovieronla siniestra.
Meçio Mio Cid los ombros e engrameo la tiesta:
«¡Albricia, Albar Fañez, ca echados somos de tierra!»
[»Mas a grand ondra tornaremos a Castiella.»]

(The last verse is not in the original transcript by Per Abbat, but it was inserted by Menéndez Pidal because it appears in later chronicles, e.g., "Veinte Reyes de Castilla (1344)".)

== Sample text ==
The following is a sample from Cantar de Mio Cid (lines 330–365), with abbreviations resolved, punctuation (the original has none), and some modernized letters. (Note: recording with reconstructed mediaeval pronunciation can be accessed here, reconstructed according to contemporary phonetics (by Jabier Elorrieta)) Below, the original Old Spanish text is presented in the first column, along with the same sample in modern Spanish in the second column and an English translation in the third column.

Old Spanish

Ya sennor glorioso, padre que en çielo estas,
Fezist çielo e tierra, el terçero el mar,
Fezist estrelas e luna, e el sol pora escalentar,
Prisist encarnaçion en Sancta Maria Madre,
En Belleem apareçist, commo fue tu veluntad,
Pastores te glorificaron, ovieronte a laudare,
Tres Reyes de Arabia te vinieron adorar,
Melchior e Gaspar e Baltasar, oro e tus e mirra
Te offreçieron, commo fue tu veluntad.
Saluest a Jonas quando cayo en la mar,
Saluest a Daniel con los leones en la mala carçel,
Saluest dentro en Roma al sennor San Sabastián,
Saluest a Sancta Susanna del falso criminal,
Por tierra andidiste XXXII annos, sennor spirital,
Mostrando los miraclos, por èn auemos que fablar,
Del agua fezist vino e dela piedra pan,
Resuçitest a Lazaro, ca fue tu voluntad,
Alos judios te dexeste prender, do dizen Monte Caluarie
Pusieronte en cruz, por nombre en Golgota,
Dos ladrones contigo, estos de sennas partes,
El vno es en parayso, ca el otro non entro ala,
Estando en la cruz vertud fezist muy grant,
Longinos era çiego, que nuquas vio alguandre,
Diot con la lança enel costado, dont yxio la sangre,
Corrio la sangre por el astil ayuso, las manos se ouo de vntar,
Alçolas arriba, legolas a la faz,
Abrio sos oios, cato atodas partes,
En ti crouo al ora, por end es saluo de mal.
En el monumento Resuçitest e fust alos ynfiernos,
Commo fue tu veluntad,
Quebranteste las puertas e saqueste los padres sanctos.
Tueres Rey delos Reyes e de todel mundo padre,
Ati adoro e creo de toda voluntad,
E Ruego a San Peydro que me aiude a Rogar
Por mio Çid el campeador, que Dios le curie de mal,
Quando oy nos partimos, en vida nos faz iuntar.

Modern Spanish

Oh Señor glorioso, Padre que en el cielo estás,
Hiciste el cielo y la tierra, al tercer día el mar,
Hiciste las estrellas y la luna, y el sol para calentar,
Te encarnaste en Santa María madre,
En Belén apareciste, como fue tu voluntad,
Pastores te glorificaron, te tuvieron que loar,
Tres reyes de Arabia te vinieron a adorar,
Melchor, Gaspar y Baltasar; oro, incienso y mirra
Te ofrecieron, como fue tu voluntad.
Salvaste a Jonás cuando cayó en el mar,
Salvaste a Daniel con los leones en la mala cárcel,
Salvaste dentro de Roma al señor San Sebastián,
Salvaste a Santa Susana del falso criminal,
Por tierra anduviste treinta y dos años, Señor espiritual,
Mostrando los milagros, por ende tenemos qué hablar,
Del agua hiciste vino y de la piedra pan,
Resucitaste a Lázaro, porque fue tu voluntad,
Por los judíos te dejaste prender, donde llaman Monte Calvario
Te pusieron en la cruz, en un lugar llamado Golgotá,
Dos ladrones contigo, estos de sendas partes,
Uno está en el paraíso, porque el otro no entró allá,
Estando en la cruz hiciste una virtud muy grande,
Longinos era ciego que jamás se vio,
Te dio con la lanza en el costado, de donde salió la sangre,
Corrió la sangre por el astil abajo, las manos se tuvo que untar,
Alzándolas arriba, llevándolas a la cara,
Abrió sus ojos, miró a todas partes,
En ti creyó entonces, por ende se salvó del mal.
En el monumento resucitaste y fuiste a los infiernos,
Como fue tu voluntad,
Quebrantaste las puertas y sacaste a los padres santos.
Tú eres Rey de los reyes y de todo el mundo padre,
A ti te adoro y creo de toda voluntad,
Y ruego a San Pedro que me ayude a rogar
Por mi Cid el Campeador, que Dios le cuide del mal,
Cuando hoy partamos, que en vida nos haga juntar.

English Translation

O glorious Lord, Father who art in Heaven,
Thou madest Heaven and Earth, and on the third day the sea,
Thou madest the stars and the Moon, and the Sun for warmth,
Thou incarnated Thyself of the Blessed Mother Mary,
In Bethlehem Thou appeared, for it was Thy will,
Shepherds glorified Thee, they gave Thee praise,
Three kings of Arabia came to worship Thee,
Melchior, Caspar, and Balthazar; offered Thee
Gold, frankincense, and myrrh, for it was Thy will.
Thou saved Jonah when he fell into the sea,
Thou saved Daniel from the lions in the terrible jail,
Thou saved Saint Sebastian from within Rome,
Thou saved Saint Susan from the false charge,
On Earth Thou walked thirty-two years, Spiritual Lord,
Performing miracles, thus we have of which to speak,
Of the water Thou madest wine and of the stone bread,
Thou revived Lazarus, because it was Thy will,
Thou left Thyself to be arrested by the Jews, where they call Mount Calvary,
They placed Thee on the Cross, in the place called Golgotha,
Two thieves with Thee, these of split paths,
One is in Paradise, but the other did not enter there,
Being on the Cross Thou didst a very great virtue,
Longinus was blind ever he saw Thee,
He gave Thee a blow with the lance in the broadside, where he left the blood,
Running down the arm, the hands Thou hadst spread,
Raised it up, as it led to Thy face,
Opened their eyes, saw all parts,
And believed in Thee then, thus saved them from evil.
Thou revived in the tomb and went to Hell,
For it was Thy will,
Thou hast broken the doors and brought out the holy fathers.
Thou art King of Kings and of all the world Father,
I worship Thee and I believe in all Thy will,
And I pray to Saint Peter to help with my prayer,
For my Cid the Champion, that God nurse from evil,
When we part today, that we are joined in this life or the next.

== Translations into English ==
- Robert Southey, Chronicle of the Cid, 1808, prose translation with other matter from chronicles and ballads, with an appendix including a partial verse translation by John Hookham Frere.
- John Ormsby, The Poem of Cid, 1879, with introduction and notes.
- Archer Milton Huntington, Poem of the Cid, (1897–1903), reprinted from the unique manuscript at Madrid, with translation and notes.
- Lesley Byrd Simpson, The Poem of the Cid, 1957.
- William S. Merwin, The Poem of the Cid, 1959.
- Paul Blackburn, Poem of the Cid: a modern translation with notes, 1966.
- Rita Hamilton, The Poem of the Cid: Dual Language Edition, 1985.
- Burton Raffel, The Song of the Cid: A Dual-Language Edition with Parallel Text, 2009.
- Michael Harney, The Epic of The Cid with related texts, 2011.
- Matthew Bailey, selections in pedagogical edition from Open Iberia/América (open access teaching anthology), 2020.

== See also ==
- El Cid
- Mocedades de Rodrigo
- Camino del Cid
