= Mester de clerecía =

Spanish literature genre in the 13th century

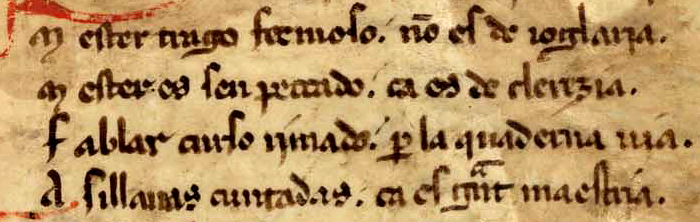
Libro de Alexandre, 13th century; this has been regarded as the declaration of principles of the "mester de clerecía": Mester traigo fermoso, non es de joglaría mester es sin pecado, ca es de clerezía fablar curso rimado por la cuaderna vía a sílabas cuntadas, ca es grant maestría. — Libro de Alexandre, vv. 5-8.

Mester de Clerecía ("Ministry of Clergy") is a Spanish literature genre that can be understood as an opposition and surpassing of Mester de Juglaría. It was cultivated in the 13th century by Spanish learned poets, usually clerics (hence the name 'clerecía').

Unlike Mester de Juglaría, Mester de Clerecía was written on paper, not anonymous, with regular metre (the cuaderna vía) and done by educated authors. Also the topics are more serious: religious, historical and novelesque. The stanzas in them are composed of 4 alexandrine lines which contain 14 syllables each.

The most famous authors of this period are Gonzalo de Berceo and Arcipreste de Hita. The Poema de Fernán González is an example of anonymous mester de clerecía.

These poets carefully counted the number of syllables in each line and strived to achieve perfect lines. The line form is the Alexandrine line (14 syllables) with consonantal rhyme in stanzas of four lines each. This form is also known as the cuaderna vía or the fourfold way, and it borrows it verse length from France and was popular until the late fourteenth century. Popular themes of these poets were Christian legends, lives of saints, and tales from classical antiquity. The poems were recited to villagers in public plazas. Two traits separate this form from the mester de juglaría: didacticism and erudition. Castilian priest and poet Gonzalo de Berceo was one of the greatest followers of the mester de clerecía. All of his works were religious; two of the most well known are Milagros de Nuestra Señora (about the miracles worked by the Virgin Mary) and Vida de Santa Oria. Fourteenth-century poet Juan Ruíz, also known as the Arcipreste de Hita, used the cuaderna vía in parts of his famous work Libro de buen amor.
