= Castilian Spanish =

Variety of Peninsular Spanish

In English, Castilian Spanish can mean the variety of Peninsular Spanish spoken in northern and central Spain, the standard form of Spanish, or Spanish from Spain in general. In Spanish, the term castellano (Castilian) can either refer to the Spanish language as a whole (to distinguish it from other Spanish languages such as Catalan, Basque, Galician, etc.), or to the medieval Old Spanish, a predecessor to Early Modern Spanish.

== Terminology ==
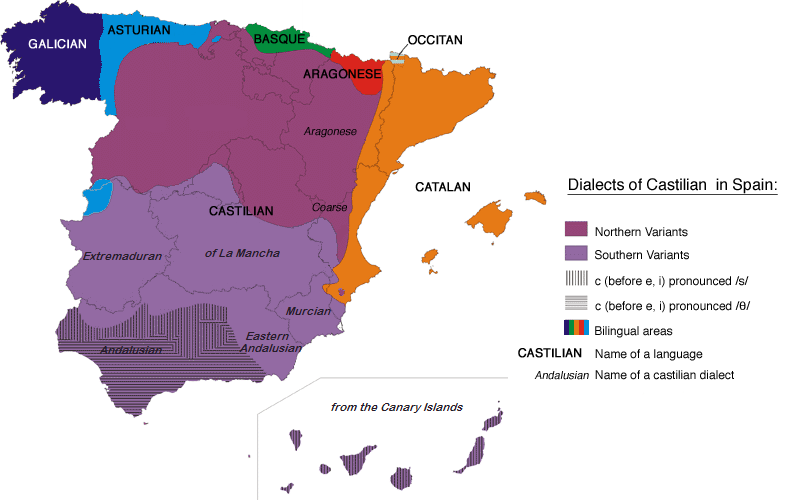
Map of languages and dialects in Spain

The term Castilian Spanish is used in English for the specific varieties of Spanish spoken in north and central Spain. This is because much of the variation in Peninsular Spanish is between north and south, often imagined as Castilian versus Andalusian. Typically, it is more loosely used to denote the Spanish spoken in all of Spain as compared to Latin American Spanish. In Spain itself, Spanish is not a uniform language and there exist several different varieties of Spanish; in addition, there are other official and unofficial languages in the country, although Spanish is official throughout Spain.

Castellano septentrional ("Northern Castilian") is the Spanish term for the dialects from the Northern half of Spain, including those from Aragón or Navarre, which were never part of Castile. These dialects can be distinguished from the southern varieties of Andalusia, Extremadura, and Murcia. Español castellano, the literal translation of Castilian Spanish, is not a common expression; it could refer to varieties found in the region of Castile; however, the dialects of Castile, like other dialects, are not homogenous, and they tend to merge gradually with the dialects of other regions.

== Phonology ==
- Word-final /d/ may be pronounced as a voiceless [θ]. This is most common in the provinces of Burgos, Palencia, Valladolid, the east of León and Zamora, northern Segovia and Ávila, and Soria. This pronunciation is present, though less common, in La Rioja, Guadalajara, Cuenca, and Madrid, and it is scarcely documented in Toledo, Ciudad Real, and Albacete.
- /d/ is elided in the ending -ado throughout nearly all of Spain. In other environments, elision of intervocalic /d/ is characteristic of southern varieties of Spanish.
- Syllable-final /s/ is often aspirated in Madrid and Castilla–La Mancha. Before a /k/ sound, it can be realized as a voiceless velar fricative [x], such that es que 'it's that' sounds like [exke]. In and around Toledo, /s/ typically remains [s] before /t/, while it's typically aspirated or elided before /p/, and usually aspirated or becomes [x] before /k/.
- /tʃ/, spelled as ⟨ch⟩, sometimes is pronounced as a palatalized voiceless alveolar affricate [t͡sʲ], at least in Madrid.
- Spanish from most of the Iberian Peninsula, including Castile, uses an apical [s̠], as opposed to the non-retracted voiceless alveolar fricative of Andalusian, Canarian, and Latin American Spanish, as well as of English.

== Grammar ==
- A wide swath of central Castile is home to leísmo. The Royal Spanish Academy considers leísmo to be incorrect, though it considers it to be admissible when referring to a single, male person.

== See also ==
- Andalusian Spanish
- Canarian Spanish
- Castúo
- Murcian Spanish
- Standard Spanish – the standard form that is very different from the medieval Spanish language-base

== Sources ==
- Fernández-Ordóñez, Inés (2016). "Dialectos del Español Peninsular" ( (PDF)). In Gutiérrez-Rexach, Javier (ed.). Enciclopedia de Lingüística Hispánica. Milton Park, Abingdon, Oxon: Routledge. ISBN 9781315713441. Archived from the original on July 12, 2020.
- Lipski, John (2012). "Geographical and Social Varieties of Spanish: An Overview" ( (PDF)). In Hualde, José Ignacio; Olarrea, Antxon; O'Rourke, Erin (eds.). The Handbook of Hispanic Linguistics. Blackwell Publishing Ltd. pp. 1–26. doi:10.1002/9781118228098.ch1. ISBN 9781405198820. Archived from the original on 2024-09-19.
- Lipski, John M. (2018). "Dialects of Spanish and Portuguese" ( (PDF)). In Boberg, Charles; Nerbonne, John; Watt, Dominic (eds.). The handbook of dialectology. Hoboken, NJ. pp. 498–509. doi:10.1002/9781118827628.ch30. ISBN 9781118827550. Archived from the original on 2024-10-04.
- Penny, Ralph J. (2000). Variation and change in Spanish. Cambridge: Cambridge University Press. doi:10.1017/CBO9781139164566. ISBN 0521780454.
