= Philippine Spanish =

Variety of Spanish language

- español filipino castellano filipino
- Pronunciation: [espaˈɲol filiˈpino], [kasteˈʎano filiˈpino]
- Native to: Philippines
- Speakers: Native: 4,000 (2020); Proficient: 400,000 (2020); Total: 1 million (2014)
- Language family: Indo-European: Italic; Latino-Faliscan; Romance; Italo-Western; Western; Ibero-Romance; West Iberian; Castilian; Spanish; Philippine Spanish
- Early forms: Proto-Indo-European: Proto-Italic; Old Latin; Vulgar Latin; Proto-Romance; Old Spanish; Early Modern Spanish
- Writing system: Latin (Spanish alphabet)

Official status
- Recognised minority language in: Philippines
- Regulated by: Philippine Academy of the Spanish Language

Language codes
- ISO 639-3: –
- Linguasphere: 51-AAA-bhw
- IETF: es-PH

Philippine Spanish (Spanish: español filipino or castellano filipino) is the variety of standard Spanish spoken in the Philippines, used primarily by Spanish Filipinos.

Spanish as spoken in the Philippines contains a number of features that distinguish it from other varieties of Spanish, combining features from both Peninsular and Latin American varieties of the language. Philippine Spanish also employs vocabulary unique to the dialect, reflecting influence from the native languages of the Philippines as well as broader sociolinguistic trends in Spanish, and is considered to be more linguistically conservative and uniform than Spanish spoken elsewhere.

Officially regulated by the Philippine Academy of the Spanish Language (AFLE, Academia Filipina de la Lengua Española), up to a million people in the Philippines are claimed to be either proficient in or have knowledge of Spanish, with around 4,000 people claiming Spanish as their native language, although estimates vary widely.

== Distribution and number of speakers ==
Philippine Spanish speakers may be found nationwide, mostly in urban areas but with the largest concentration of speakers in Metro Manila. Smaller communities are found particularly in regions where the economy is dominated by large agricultural plantations, such as the sugarcane-producing regions of Negros, particularly around Bacolod and Dumaguete, and in the fruit-producing regions of Mindanao, particularly around Cagayan de Oro and Davao City. Other centers where Spanish-speaking populations can be found include the cities of Cebu, Iloilo and Zamboanga. Most native Philippine Spanish speakers are part of the country's middle and upper classes.

Estimates as to the number of Spanish speakers in the Philippines vary widely, with estimates ranging from the thousands to the millions. In 2014, the Instituto Cervantes (IC) estimated that there were around one million Spanish speakers in the Philippines, regardless of level of proficiency, while in 2023 Maria Luisa Young, professor of Spanish and head of the Department of Modern Languages at the Ateneo de Manila University, estimated without confidence that around 500,000 people in the Philippines either speak or at least know Spanish. A 2023 report by the IC, meanwhile, estimated that there are around 465,000 Spanish speakers in the Philippines, though only counting Spanish citizens in the Philippines as having a native-level command of the language, (Note: The Instituto Cervantes uses the term grupo de dominio nativo ('native fluency group'), counting monolingual Spanish speakers and bilingual speakers living in Spanish-speaking countries, but not monolingual speakers of other languages. In the case of the Philippines, the report notes that the number of speakers belonging to this group (4,471) is merely informative, and that this number is not included in the total number of speakers to avoid counting speakers twice.) including speakers of the various dialects of Chavacano, a Spanish-based creole, as limited-competence speakers, (Note: The Instituto Cervantes uses the term grupo de competencia limitada ('limited competency group'), counting second- and third-generation Spanish speakers in bilingual communities, speakers of mixed language varieties, and foreigners living in Spanish-speaking countries whose native language is not Spanish. In the case of the Philippines, Chavacano speakers are considered to have a limited competence in Spanish, a status also accorded to speakers of Papiamento and Chamorro.) and excluding Filipinos who studied Spanish in universities before 1986. When counting native speakers, the Philippine Statistics Authority reported in the 2020 Philippine census that only 167 households nationwide spoke Spanish at home, and a 2020 estimate estimated that this group numbered around 4,000 people, but the actual number of native Philippine Spanish speakers living today may be impossible to determine.

Accurately counting Spanish speakers in the Philippines is complicated by the Philippine government not keeping updated official statistics, with the last supposedly reliable statistics on the number of speakers dating back to 2008. That estimate placed the number of native Spanish speakers at around 6,000, with an additional two million Filipinos who speak Spanish either as a second or third language and another 1.2 million Chavacano speakers, and that number possibly being larger due to increasing interest in learning Spanish among Filipinos for professional reasons.

In addition to reported estimates of speakers, it is believed that there is an undetermined but significant number of Spanish semi-speakers, Filipinos who may otherwise have never formally learned Spanish but whose knowledge of the language, whilst below that of native speakers, is considered to be superior to that of foreign students learning the language for the first time.

=== Status and future ===
Compared to other Spanish varieties, Philippine Spanish is among the least studied, and many contemporary studies that claim to talk about the dialect were, in fact, either dealing with Spanish loanwords in the native languages of the Philippines or, more erroneously, to the various Chavacano dialects to which it was often mistakenly confused for.

Philippine Spanish has been described as being endangered, or even totally dead, with most speakers also being fluent in English and the Philippine languages, and the language having few native speakers under the age of 50, with many of its speakers also having learned other Spanish dialects and are living outside the Philippines either in Spain or in other Spanish-speaking countries. In part due to the American colonization of the Philippines, where English was imposed as the language of government and education, and the implementation of a Tagalog-based national language (which later became Filipino), use of Spanish declined, particularly after World War II when English was entrenched as the language of social prestige. Spanish-speaking Filipinos mostly use the language at home, with use of the language in public being limited by a lack of speakers and hostility from non-Spanish-speaking Filipinos toward the language, although many Filipinos who previously studied Spanish while it was still mandatory are capable of sustaining a conversation that reasonably approximates the language.

This, however, contrasts with recent trends concerning Spanish in the Philippines more broadly, on the one hand due to changing attitudes toward the language among non-Spanish-speaking Filipinos, and on the other due to the growing prestige of the language worldwide. Interest in the language started growing in the 1990s, only a few years after the language lost its official status, and starting in 2009 Spanish was reintroduced as part of the basic education curriculum in a number of public high schools, becoming the largest foreign language program offered by the public school system, with over 7,000 students studying the language in the 2021–2022 school year alone. The local business process outsourcing industry has also contributed to the growing popularity of Spanish as Spanish speakers have a larger earnings potential than English speakers in the industry. A new generation of Spanish speakers has since emerged as a result, most of whom are second-language speakers, and with some using the language to show national pride, though there exists within this group a smaller number of first-language Spanish speakers who are learning the language at home from their second-language parents.

== Phonology ==
External videos
- Samples of contemporary Philippine Spanish speakers
- Anna Balcells, founder of the Kalipay Negrense Foundation (2022)
- Guillermo Gómez Rivera, director of the Philippine Academy of the Spanish Language (2022)
- Gloria Macapagal Arroyo, 14th president of the Philippines (2011)
- Fernando Zialcita, professor of anthropology at the Ateneo de Manila University (2024)

Philippine Spanish phonology has been described as conservative and refined, reflecting the socioeconomic status of its speakers, and exhibiting features largely present in the standard dialects of Peninsular Spanish as spoken in the late 19th and early 20th centuries, with little influence from dialects such as Andalusian or Canarian nor from languages like Catalan or Galician despite significant immigration to the Philippines from those areas of Spain. Nevertheless, a number of phonological traits still distinguish Philippine Spanish from Spanish spoken elsewhere as a result of earlier contact with Latin American Spanish varieties, contact with the Philippine languages and the development of Chavacano, though unlike with Philippine English, Philippine Spanish phonology is generally uniform, with very little (if any) dialectical variation in terms of pronunciation between speakers of Spanish from different regions of the country.

=== Distinction between y and ll ===
As in some dialects in northern Spain and some bilingual zones (Bolivia, Paraguay, and Peru) of Latin America, Philippine Spanish has a phonological distinction between the sounds represented by ll (/ʎ/) and y (/ʝ/). For example, calle ('street') is pronounced /ˈkaʎe/ (Tagalog kalye) as opposed to the pronunciation /ˈkaʝe/ found in most other present-day Spanish varieties. The phoneme /ʎ/ may be realized closer to [lj] in the pronunciation of some younger Philippine Spanish speakers. Sometimes /ʎ/ is depalatalized to [l] in word-initial positions: for example, lluvia ('rain'), normally pronounced /ˈʎubia/, is pronounced [ˈlubja].

While yeísmo, which merges the two, is today considered extremely rare and idiosyncratic in Philippine Spanish, it has been suggested that a more yeísta pronunciation was previously standard owing to the influence of both Andalusian and Mexican Spanish speakers in the 16th and 17th centuries. This is suggested by words such as caballo ('horse'), pronounced /kaˈbajo/ in many Philippine languages and with the spelling reflecting this pronunciation (e.g. Tagalog kabayo), although others have instead borrowed the lleísta form (e.g. Ilocano kabalio). Speakers only shifted to a contrasting pronunciation, which was characteristic of the aristocratic Castilian pronunciation of the time, toward the end of the 19th century in the final years of Spanish colonization, although it has been suggested that a residual yeísmo continues to persist in the speech of modern-day Philippine Spanish speakers.

Newer generations of Spanish speakers have begun adopting phonological features closer to standard Peninsular Spanish, including yeísmo, as a result of being educated in that dialect, although the majority of those studying Spanish in the Philippines as a foreign language nonetheless continue to contrast both sounds.

=== Seseo ===
Like Latin American Spanish, Philippine Spanish practices seseo, where /θ/ is normally not distinguished from /s/. This is particularly evidenced by borrowings into the Philippine languages where, for example, circo ('circus'), pronounced /ˈθiɾko/ in Peninsular Spanish, became Tagalog sirko (pronounced /ˈsiɾko/). Although seseo remains the dominant pronunciation today, in a similar way to the introduction of a contrast between y and ll at the end of the 19th century, some native speakers have begun practicing distinción, where /θ/ is distinguished from /s/, but do not always do so consistently.

Newer generations of Spanish speakers have begun adopting distinción as a result of being educated in Peninsular Spanish, alongside a contemporary adoption of yeísmo. Among those studying Spanish in the Philippines as a foreign language, most practice distinción although a large group of students nonetheless practice seseo, and among those who do practice distinción, most do so inconsistently.

=== Pronunciation of plosive consonants ===
The consonants /b/, /d/ and /g/ are uniformly pronounced as plosive (hard) consonants in Philippine Spanish, contrasting with other Spanish dialects where these are usually softened to either approximants or fricatives. While the softened pronunciations are also heard, this varies between speakers and even between individual phonemes.

Of particular note is the pronunciation of intervocalic /d/, where it can even overlap with and is occasionally pronounced as [ɾ] as is the case in the Philippine languages. This trait has also carried over to Chavacano and has influenced how the Philippine languages have treated Spanish loans as in the case, for example, of Spanish pared ('wall') becoming Tagalog pader.

Intervocalic /d/ is also frequently elided, particularly with words ending in the suffix -ado.

=== Palatalization and affrication ===
Before the close vowel /i/, /d/ and /t/ are often palatalized by Philippine Spanish speakers, becoming [dʲ] and [tʲ] respectively. Occasionally these may be affricated instead, becoming [dʒ] and [tʃ] respectively as in the case of Spanish loans to the Philippine languages (cf. yod-coalescence in English, or a similar phenomenon in Brazilian Portuguese). For example, Dios ('God'), normally pronounced /ˈdios/, may be pronounced [ˈd͡ʒos] (Tagalog Diyos), or tiangue ('open-air market'), normally pronounced /ˈtjanɡe/, may be pronounced [ˈt͡ʃaŋɡe] (Tagalog tiyangge).

In a similar manner, speakers also occasionally palatalize /s/ to [ʃ] when placed before /i/. For example, negocio ('business'), normally pronounced /neˈɡosjo/, may be pronounced [neˈɡoʃo] (Tagalog negosyo), and ciudad ('city'), normally pronounced /sjuˈdad/, may be pronounced [ʃuˈdad] (Tagalog siyudad).

=== Retraction of /x/ to [h] ===
The velar jota sound (/x/) is present in Philippine Spanish, similar to standard Peninsular Spanish, though this is mostly retracted to glottal [h], which also occurs in Andalusian, Caribbean, Canarian, Central American, and Colombian Spanish.

=== Merger of non-open vowels and bilabial consonants ===
Often interchanged in Philippine Spanish are the non-open vowels /e/ and /i/, /o/ and /u/, and the bilabial consonants /p/ and /f/, following a similar tendency in the Philippine languages. For example, Filipinas ('Philippines') would be pronounced [piliˈpinas] (Tagalog Pilipinas), tenía ('I had') would be pronounced [tiˈnia], and comen ('they eat') would be pronounced [ˈkumen].

=== No debuccalization of /s/ ===
Unlike many Peninsular and Latin American dialects, syllable-final /s/ is not debuccalized, and is always pronounced as an alveolar sibilant ([s]) rather than as a glottal fricative ([h]). For example, las moscas ('flies', as in the insect) is always pronounced [las ˈmoskas]. The retention of s is reflective of the influence of northern Peninsular Spanish dialects, although it is considered an unusual development in Philippine Spanish given the large number of Andalusian Spanish speakers among the last wave of Spanish migrants to the Philippines.

In contrast, Chavacano speakers do practice syllable-final s-dropping, most notably among older speakers of the Zamboagueño dialect spoken in the Zamboanga Peninsula.

=== Glottal stop ===
As a result of contact with the Philippine languages, the glottal stop [ʔ] regularly manifests in the speech of most (if not all) Philippine Spanish speakers, and is normally found in word-initial positions where the pronunciation begins with a vowel. For example, alma ('spirit') would be pronounced [ˈʔalma]. This is also present when the word is preceded by a pause, which in other Spanish dialects would be subject to consonantal linking (similar to the liaison in French). For example, el hombre ('the man') would be pronounced as [elˈʔombɾe] in Philippine Spanish but [eˈlombɾe] in other Spanish dialects.

The glottal stop also appears in some vowel sequences, serving to clearly delineate syllables from one another. For example, maíz ('corn') would be pronounced [maˈʔis], and baúl ('trunk', as in the luggage) would be pronounced [baˈʔul].

=== [ɾ]–[l] shift ===
Philippine Spanish clearly distinguishes between the use of [ɾ] and [l], similar to standard Peninsular Spanish. However, earlier speakers may have interchanged both sounds, with /l/ becoming [ɾ] and /ɾ/ becoming [l] as in Caribbean and southern Peninsular Spanish dialects, and which was retained in the various Chavacano dialects.

Despite this distinction certain words in the Philippine Spanish lexicon nevertheless reflect this earlier tendency to interchange both sounds, such as balasar, a variant of barajar ('to shuffle') which the dialect had preserved.

=== Treatment of tl ===
Similar to Latin American, Canarian and certain Peninsular Spanish dialects, Philippine Spanish pronounces the letter sequence tl in the same syllable. For example, the word atlas is pronounced [ˈa.tlas], not [ˈað.las] as in standard Peninsular Spanish.

== Morphology and syntax ==
A recording of Emilio Aguinaldo, the first president of the Philippines, delivering a speech in Spanish (1929)

Philippine Spanish has been described as having no particularly unique morphological features, although deviations from standard Spanish morphology and syntax have been reported as a result of Spanish's position as a minority language in the Philippines.

=== Pronouns ===
Alongside Equatoguinean Spanish, Philippine Spanish is one of only two Spanish dialects outside of Spain to use the second-person plural pronoun vosotros, although ustedes, standard in Latin America, has been reported as also being common in written texts. The second-person familiar pronoun tú is also freely used, even in situations where the polite pronoun usted would be used instead, and while voseo is absent in contemporary Philippine Spanish, which exclusively uses tú, it has been suggested that voseo previously existed in the dialect as evidenced by its residual use in expressions such as ¡rayo vos! (lit. 'go to hell!'), which in turn led to the development of voseo in Chavacano.

Unlike other overseas Spanish dialects, Philippine Spanish is said to employ leísmo, where the pronoun le is used when referring to third-person masculine direct objects instead of lo as is the case elsewhere, although others have said this only represents a minority of speakers and that Philippine Spanish speakers mostly use lo. However, for indirect objects, the use of le is predominant, with a minority of speakers using la (laísmo).

=== Possession and derivation ===
Indicating possession in Philippine Spanish is frequently expressed not through possessive adjectives, but rather by combining the object with the construction de ('of') and the possessor. For example, instead of nuestros parientes ('our relatives') as in standard Spanish, Philippine Spanish speakers would often say los parientes de nosotros (lit. 'the relatives of us'). This also happens with the third-person possessive pronoun su, which parallels Latin American usage with speakers alternating between, for example, Este perro es suyo (lit. 'This dog is theirs') and Este perro es de él (lit. 'This dog is of him'). A similar phenomenon also defines the naming of certain flora, with fruit trees sometimes being called the tree of that fruit. For example, while Spanish has an actual word for an orange tree, naranjo, Philippine Spanish speakers would sometimes say árbol de naranja instead.

In expressing derivation, the most commonly used suffix for creating diminutives in Philippine Spanish is -ito, although -illo is also encountered but less commonly. For augmentatives, the most commonly used suffix is -ón, followed by -azo and -ote in order of frequency. Meanwhile, for forming collective nouns, the most common suffix is -ada, followed by -aje when referring to people. For plants and produce, the most common suffix is -al, followed by -ero and -ar, but noun phrases formed by combining the name of the plant or produce, either with or without the standard suffixes depending on the plant or produce being discussed, with plantación (de) ('plantation [of]'), campo (de) ('field [of]') or sementera (de) ('land sown with') are also commonly employed.

=== Negation ===
In certain cases, Philippine Spanish expresses negation in a manner broadly similar to other Spanish varieties. For example, the determiner más ('more' or 'else') is used to amplify nunca ('never'), nadie ('no one'), nada ('nothing') and ninguno ('nobody') and is normally found in a postnominal (after the word) position, but occasionally this is reversed by Philippine Spanish speakers with más appearing in the prenominal (before the word) position.

Other cases exhibit deviations from standard Spanish usage. The negative adverbial phrase no más ("no more"), for example, is used in one of three ways in Philippine Spanish:

- To express exactness (Lo tiene al lado mismo no más; lit. 'He/she has it exactly right next to him/her').
- As an emphatic suffix (Estaba bromeando no más; lit. 'I was only joking'). This use of no más is also found in Latin American Spanish, and is equivalent to the use of solo or solamente in standard Spanish.
- To express finiteness (No hay más carruajes; lit. 'There aren't carriages any more'). This use of no más may have come about as a result of English influence, and is equivalent to the use of ya no in other Spanish varieties.

Adverbial no is also regularly paired with other adverbs to express negation, even if the pairing would be considered redundant in standard Spanish. For example, Philippine Spanish speakers often pair adverbial no with tan and tanto (or even tantito), both implying extent, as a substitute for no muy ('not very') and no mucho ('not much') respectively. In a similar manner, Philippine Spanish speakers also often substitute tampoco ('neither') with también no (lit. 'also no'), which has been formally proscribed in standard Spanish, and even tampoco itself is paired with no to create the redundant double negative tampoco no (lit. 'neither no'), which in standard Spanish is likewise normally considered incorrect.

== Vocabulary ==
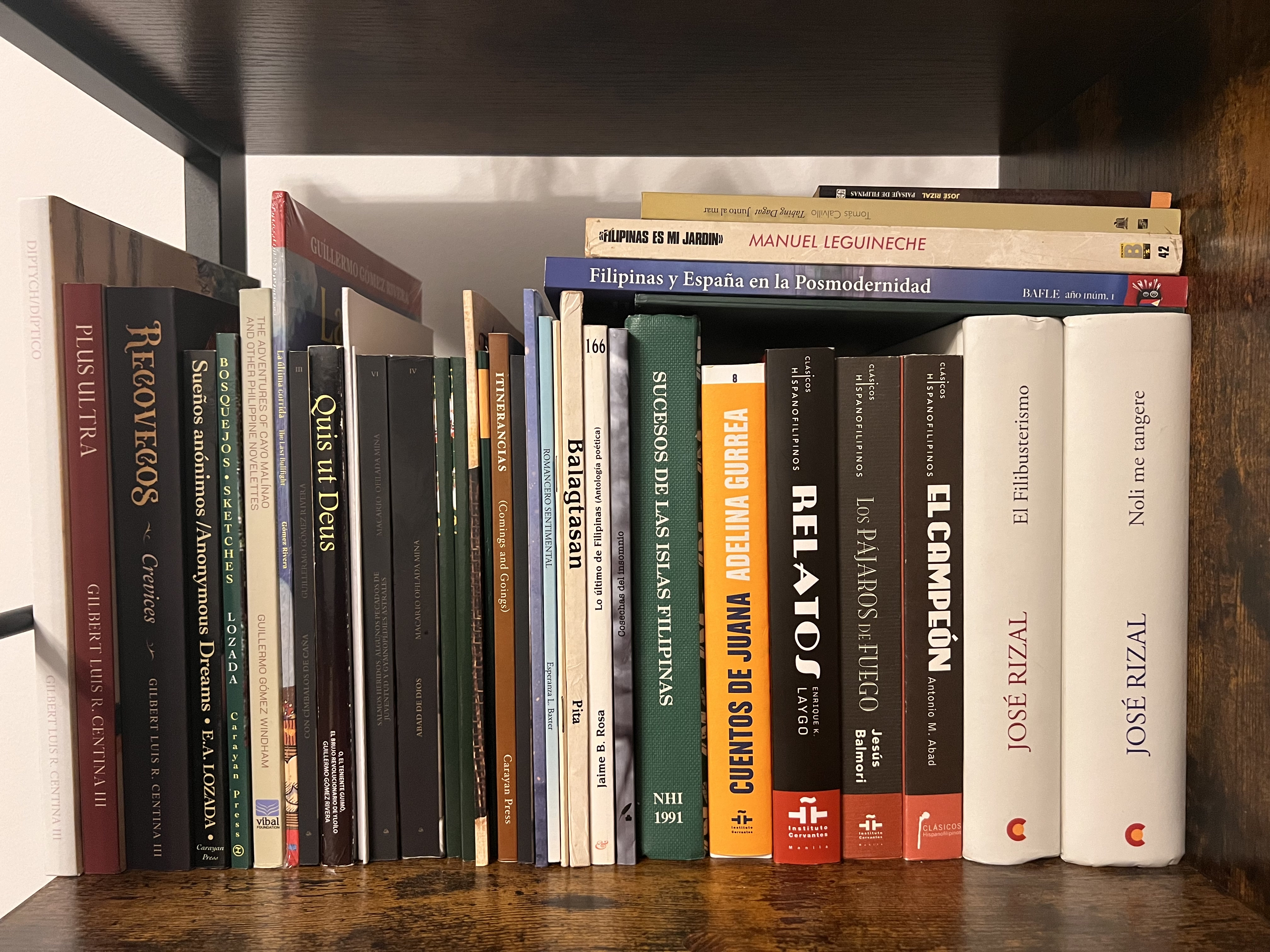
Selected books from the corpus of Philippine literature in Spanish, both historical and contemporary

Over the centuries Philippine Spanish has developed a corpus of filipinismos (lit. 'Philippinisms'), vocabulary and expressions that are unique to the dialect, of which some have even entered Spanish more broadly and others which have influenced the native languages of the Philippines. Philippinisms in Philippine Spanish are usually derived from a number of sources: words borrowed into Spanish from the Philippine or other foreign languages, Spanish words that have since fallen out of use in Spain or in Spanish more broadly, and Spanish expressions made by Philippine Spanish speakers or are otherwise unique to the country. Since the mid-20th century, the Philippine Spanish lexicon has also been significantly influenced by English, similar to the situation with Spanish in Puerto Rico and the United States.

Although there are efforts in documenting filipinismos, and people studying Spanish as a foreign language today still learn and use Philippine Spanish vocabulary, many of them are in danger of disappearing due to the "foreignization" of Spanish language education in the Philippines (as Peninsular instead of Philippine Spanish is taught in schools), alongside poor documentation practices which lead to, among others, some expressions not being documented and some whose origin is obscured, and a lack of a stronger effort to compile a comprehensive dictionary of these expressions, or at least to include them in the Diccionario de la lengua española.

=== From Latin American Spanish ===
Philippine Spanish incorporates a number of words and expressions from Latin American Spanish varieties, most notably from Mexican Spanish but also including influences from other dialects. Some of the vocabulary said to be derived from Mexican Spanish, however, has been described as instead being direct loans to Philippine Spanish from Aztecan languages like Nahuatl as opposed to coming to the Philippines through Mexican Spanish. Words like metate, jícara, and chongo reflect this influence, as well as the use of certain hypocorisms.

Latin American influence in Philippine Spanish is also reflected in the use of Americanisms like maní to describe peanuts and hincarse to describe kneeling, instead of the Peninsular Spanish equivalents cacahuete (or even the Mexican variant cacahuate) and arrodillarse.

=== From Peninsular Spanish ===
Much of the basic vocabulary of Philippine Spanish is also derived from Peninsular Spanish. For example, Philippine Spanish uses patata to describe a potato, the same as in Spain. Some words do take on a different meaning in Philippine Spanish: for example, while speakers use the Latin American camarón to describe a shrimp (e.g. camarón rebozado), the Peninsular equivalent gamba is also used but with a slightly more specialized meaning (in this case, a shrimp smaller than a camarón).

In certain cases some words are used by speakers in a more-or-less equal proportion, such as with the Peninsular melocotón and the Latin American durazno to describe a peach. In others, the Peninsular equivalent isn't used at all: for example, to describe an apartment the Latin American terms apartamento and departamento are used exclusively as opposed to the Peninsular piso.

=== From English ===
Anglicisms in Philippine Spanish can be classified into three types: those that are present in standard Spanish, those that are also found in Spanish as spoken in the United States, and a much smaller number of words that were borrowed into the language but still carry their original spelling and meaning from English. These include words like planta for 'plant' (instead of fábrica), sugestión for 'suggestion' (instead of sugerencia) and the direct importation of English words like avocado, jeepney and overol ('overalls').

Because most Spanish-speaking Filipinos are also fluent in English, English pronunciation also affects how Philippine Spanish speakers pronounce certain words. Some speakers, for example, would pronounce Europa ('Europe') as [juˈɾopa], as in English, instead of /euˈɾopa/.

=== Unique words and expressions ===
Many words and expressions used by Spanish speakers in the Philippines are unique to Philippine Spanish, though a number of these have since entered the Diccionario de la lengua española and other publications of the Royal Spanish Academy (RAE). Some of the first filipinismos incorporated by the RAE into its publications include words like caracoa, barangay and parao, which entered the broader lexicon in the late 18th and early 19th century, and the number of filipinismos has ostensibly grown over time, forming a corpus where unique words and expressions in Philippine Spanish can be broadly placed into four categories:

- Words and expressions borrowed into Philippine Spanish, or even Spanish more broadly, as a result of contact with the Philippine languages (such as bolo, which was borrowed from the Tagalog bolo, or baguio to describe typhoons). However, the extent of borrowing has varied: borrowing from the Philippine languages, or even from other languages like Chinese, into Philippine Spanish has been described as either being mainly limited to flora and fauna, contrasting with the significant influence played by Philippine languages in the development of Chavacano, or as being more varied but with loans largely being limited to sociocultural domains like food.
- Words and expressions that have fallen out of use in other Spanish dialects, but were retained in Philippine Spanish (such as aparador to describe a wardrobe, whereas other Spanish dialects would use armario, the use of aeroplano instead of avión to describe an airplane, or the use of the dated phrase ¿Cuál es su gracia? [lit. 'What is your grace?'] to ask for someone's name, which has since died out in other countries)
- Words and expressions that have undergone a semantic change in Philippine Spanish (such as lenguaje to refer to a national language, or morisqueta to refer to cooked white rice)
- Words and expressions in Philippine Spanish that were developed in the Philippines by Spanish speakers and have no (or other) equivalents in other Spanish dialects (such as abrazador to describe a bolster pillow, abogadillo to describe a paralegal, barcada to describe a group of friends, or código to describe a cheat sheet)

In his observations of the language as spoken in the Philippines, Wenceslao Retana classifies filipinismos as belonging into one of five grammatical types:

- Words derived from Spanish that are commonly used in the Philippines and which could be reasonably understood by Spanish speakers in other countries (such as abanico, abogado, palenque and petaca)
- Words which appear to be Spanish but are not Castilian in origin, coined by Philippine Spanish speakers either out of whim or necessity (such as dobladora and tinola)
- Words borrowed into Philippine Spanish from the Philippine languages but modified to fit Spanish prosody (such as buyo and molave)
- Words which contain Spanish suffixes, regardless if the term is formed from a Spanish root or from the Philippine languages (such as abacalero)
- Words specific to Philippine Spanish which were developed by Spanish-speaking Filipinos, and whose use had since been adopted by Spanish speakers arriving in the country from Spain or elsewhere (such as casillas and corrido)

Many filipinismos that are commonly used in the Philippines, such as pan de sal and cundimán, by both Spanish and non-Spanish speakers alike have yet to be recognized by the RAE, and calls have been made for their inclusion.

== See also ==
- Spanish dialects and varieties
- Spanish language in the Philippines
- Philippine literature in Spanish
- Philippine Academy of the Spanish Language
