= Standard Spanish =

Standard form of the Spanish language

Standard Spanish, also called the norma culta, 'cultivated norm', refers to the standard, or codified, variety of the Spanish language, which most writing and formal speech in Spanish tends to reflect. This standard, like other standard languages, tends to reflect the norms of upper-class, educated speech. There is variation within this standard such that one may speak of the Mexican, Latin American, Peninsular (or European), and Rioplatense standards, in addition to the standard forms developed by international organizations and multinational companies.

== Development ==
=== Medieval period ===
According to Ramón Menéndez Pidal's thesis, the dialect that would become standard Spanish originated in the speech of medieval Burgos and surrounding areas. The traits of Burgos speech began to extend beyond its immediate area due to the military success of the Kingdom of Castile. Crucially, speakers of the Burgos dialect were involved in the 1085 capture of Toledo, which was the traditional old capital of a united peninsular kingdom in the Visigothic era. In the ensuing dialect mix, characteristics of Burgos speech became more favored in upper-class Toledan speech than those native to Toledo or those brought by other settlers. Thus, post-reconquest Toledan speech was characterized by a large number of features from Burgos. This city became the main center of the kingdom and the Christian Primate see, giving its local dialect a privileged position.

The standardization of Spanish required its use in a large number of domains, traditionally reserved for Latin, and that required speakers to become conscious of Spanish as a separate linguistic code from Latin. The introduction of new ways of writing Romance from France, resulting in spelling systems which sought to represent the phonemes of the local Romance dialect, led to such a linguistic consciousness. This new spelling was used inconsistently at first, but became used with increasing sophistication by the early 13th century. In particular, finding a way to represent Romance's sibilant and palatal consonants in this new system was quite difficult, because Latin had no palatals and only one sibilant, /s/, and so the representation of these phonemes was very inconsistent at first.

The first major steps toward standardization of Castilian were taken in the 13th century by King Alfonso X of Castile (Alfonso, the Wise), who assembled scribes and translators at his main court in Toledo. The king supervised a vast number of writings and even wrote some documents himself. These included extensive works on history, astronomy, law, and other fields of knowledge, either composed originally or translated from Islamic sources. This huge amount of writing based out of Toledo, in fields previously reserved for Latin, had a standardizing effect on written Romance in the area. It also led to a massive expansion of Castilian's vocabulary, mainly achieved through borrowing, but also through derivation, especially through the use of suffixes. The syntax of written Spanish also became a lot more elaborate, with a greater number of subordinate clauses, and fewer clauses connected with e 'and'. Additionally, the orthography, which had been quite chaotic at the beginning of Alfonso X's reign in the mid-13th century, became systematized, although it was not entirely free of variation.

Alfonso X's promotion of writing in Castilian was likely intended in part to have a unifying effect on his kingdom. Each of the three more well-established written languages, Latin, Hebrew and Arabic, was associated with a particular religious community, while Castilian or a closely related dialect was spoken by nearly everyone.

=== Renaissance and Golden Age ===
The first grammar of Castilian, and the first explicit codification of any modern European language, was published in 1492 by Antonio de Nebrija. Further commentary on the language was offered by Juan de Valdés in 1535. At around the same time, early printers also played a strong standardizing role. Nebrija notably described the Spanish language he sought to codify as a companion of empire in his address to Queen Isabella, at the time referring to Spain's possessions in Europe and not to Spain's soon-to-be-conquered possessions in the Americas.

After the settling of the Royal Court at Madrid, and subsequent dialect mixing and the establishment of new varieties spoken in Madrid, standard written Spanish became primarily based on the speech of Madrid, even though its origin is sometimes popularly assigned to other cities, such as Valladolid.

The Early Modern Spanish of the 16th and 17th centuries is sometimes called classical or Golden Age Spanish, referring to the literary accomplishments of that period. Spanish orthography was still far from consistent during this time. The gap between the largely unchanged system developed under Alfonso X and spoken Spanish expanded due to changes such as the evolution of sibilants and the loss of /h/, which occurred during this time, and betacism, or the merger of the phonemes /b/ and /v/, which had become complete in northern Spain by the fifteenth century.

One notable case of grammatical variation in Spanish has to do with third-person object pronouns. Much of northern Spain, as well as Andalusia and Latin America, uniformly uses an etymological, case-based system in which lo, la, los, las retain their accusative value, while le, les is only used for indirect objects. That said, there is competition between that system and others in much of Spain. These other systems are either the purely semantic system, in which lo is reserved for non-countable objects, while le, la, les, las refer to countable objects, and there is no marking for case, as found in the traditional speech of much of northwestern Castile, eastern Cantabria and part of the western Basque Country, or hybrid systems in-between the two extremes. One such hybrid system, largely identical to the semantic system but with a gender distinction for non-countable objects (as in, esta leche hay que echarla 'this milk has to be thrown out', where the purely semantic system would use echarlo), was dominant in the written Spanish of Golden Age Castile.

A number of phonetic features which have since become restricted to nonstandard speech were frequently represented in writing during the Spanish Golden Age. For example, the handling of syllable-final labial and velar consonants in a number of Latinate words, such as concepto 'concept' and absolver 'absolve' was highly variable during this period. Typically, these forms alternated between forms with and without the coda consonant, such as acidente/accidente 'accident'. There were also cases of labials becoming u, as in conceuto 'concept' or cautivo 'captive', and interchanges of ⟨p/b⟩ and ⟨c/g⟩, as in correbto/correcto 'correct'. These labial and velar consonants have been preserved in most words in the modern standard, while rural, nonstandard varieties typically prohibit syllable-final labial and velar consonants. Likewise, there was a frequent interchange between non-stressed /e/ and /i/ and between non-stressed /o/ and /u/, as in much modern nonstandard Spanish. That said, a preference for the now-standard forms was beginning to form, as Juan de Valdés recommends forms like vanidad/cubrir 'vanity/cover' over their competitors vanedad/cobrir.

=== Modern era ===
In 1713, with the foundation of the Royal Spanish Academy, part of the Academy's explicit purpose was the normalization of the language, "to fix the words and expressions of the Castilian language with the greatest possible propriety, elegance and purity". Throughout the 18th century the Academy developed means of standardization. Between 1726 and 1793 it published a "dictionary of the Castilian language, in which the true sense of the words is explained, as well as their nature and quality, along with the phrases and forms of speech, and the proverbs, sayings, and other matters pertinent to the use of the language". In 1771 a Grammar of the Spanish Language was published.

One area of the language the Academy sought to fix was its orthography. Because of the growing distance between spelling and pronunciation, a concern for spelling reform had developed in the 17th century. This culminated in the 1741 publishing of the Academy's Orthography of the Spanish Language. Between then and 1815, the Academy carried out a significant number of spelling reforms, until Spanish orthography essentially reached its modern form. In the case of coda labial and velar consonants, the Academy typically ruled in favor of variants, like accidente, which maintained those consonants. That said, in some cases, like sujeto 'subject', the simpler form prevailed, in other cases both forms survive with slightly different uses, like respecto/respeto 'respect'. In some cases with the sub-, ob- prefixes, like obscuro/oscuro 'dark', variation persists, although the simpler forms appear certain to prevail. When coda velar or labial consonants followed a nasal consonant, as in prompto/pronto 'soon', the middle velar or labial was simply dropped.

In the 19th century, as the various republics of Latin America became independent, the use of Spanish was connected to nationhood, and numerous constitutions recognized Spanish as the official language of their respective countries. The Spanish language words used in the Latin American countries began to be recorded in dictionaries as "Americanisms", beginning in the 19th century.

There is still some variation, especially lexical and phonological, in the current standard, and forms of address differ between different countries, with the informal second-person plural vosotros predominantly being used in Spain, and voseo being used in much of Latin America. As mentioned above, there is still significant variation in the use of third-person clitic pronouns. While Latin America uniformly uses the etymological system inherited from southern Spain, there is much competition between that system and others in the written language of much of the rest of Spain. One hybrid system, which is mostly case-based except that le, les can also refer to masculine human direct object referents, has become dominant in Spain today, although it only made it into prescriptive grammars in the 20th century. Uses which deviate from the etymological system are labelled leísmo, or the use of le, les for a direct object, and laísmo, refers to the use of la, las for an indirect object.

Following a period of concern over the unity of the language, Latin American Spanish began to be taken into account in designing prescriptive grammars and dictionaries, from the mid-20th century onwards.

== The relationship between standard and nonstandard varieties ==
The phrase "dialects of Spanish" often leads to the misunderstanding that a previously uniform Spanish has split into several divergent varieties, and that nonstandard varieties are derivatives, or debasements, of standard Spanish. This is historically backwards because language has always existed in a state of variation, and standard languages are historically derived from local dialects, not the other way around. Additionally, the standardization of Spanish has led to a reduction in the amount of variation reflected in writing.

In many cases, non-standard varieties, as well as Judaeo-Spanish, retain features which were once common in written, standard Spanish. For instance, while there was variation in the imperfect and conditional endings of verbs between the now-standard -ía, and -íe and -ié (i.e. tenía, teníe, tenié, cantaría, cantaríe, cantarié 'I had, I would sing') in writing up until the end of the fourteenth century, the -ié variant could still be heard in rural areas of the Province of Toledo as of the later 20th century. Likewise, until shortly after the end of the fifteenth century, words that had inherited syllable-final v alternated with forms in which that v had been vocalized to u. While forms with u, such as deuda 'debt' and ciudad 'city' are now standard, Judaeo-Spanish prefers forms with the original v.

The preterite forms of some irregular verbs had multiple variants until the 17th century. Thus, the verb traer 'to bring' could be conjugated truxe, truxo 'I brought, he brought', alongside modern traxe, traxo (now spelled with ⟨j⟩ and not ⟨x⟩). The variants truje, trujo are still found in some predominantly rural nonstandard varieties.

Although a /g/ has been added to the stems of many verbs' first-person singular present indicative and present subjunctive forms, such as caigo/caiga from earlier cayo/caya, some other forms such as haiga, common in literary Spanish until the 17th century, are now restricted to nonstandard speech.

Until the mid-16th century, the short subject forms nos, vos 'we, you' were still found alongside the expanded forms nosotros, vosotros in writing. The shorter form vos is used in Judaeo-Spanish, alongside the expanded vosotros, and the use of non-deferential, singular vos continues in much of Latin America, where it has become known as voseo. While voseo has become part of standard usage in some countries, such as Argentina, its existence has always been controversial, and it remains stigmatized in other locations.

Standard Spanish may be seen as a type of roof covering and influencing the various spoken dialects of Spanish. Individual varieties of Spanish can be located in both geographical and social space, with the speech of the most powerful being most similar to the standard roof, while the speech of the least powerful differs the most from the standard. Today, forms from standard Spanish are increasingly penetrating into rural speech and competing with nonstandard forms.

== Concern over fragmentation ==
During the 1880s, a new political situation and the intellectual independence of the former colonies drove the Real Academia Española to propose the formation of branch academies in the Spanish-speaking republics. The project encountered some opposition from local intellectuals. In Argentina, for example, Juan Antonio Argerich, suspecting an attempt by Spain at cultural restoration, argued in favor of an independent academy, one that would not be merely "a branch office, a servant to Spanish imperialism", and Juan María Gutiérrez rejected the naming of a correspondent. However, the proposal was finally accepted, eventually resulting in the founding of the Association of Spanish Language Academies.

The academies insisted on the preservation of a "common language", based on the upper-class speech of Spain and without regard for the influence that indigenous languages of the Americas and other European languages such as Italian, Portuguese, and English were having on the lexicon and even the grammar of American Spanish. That orientation persisted through the 20th century. A 1918 letter from Ramón Menéndez Pidal of the Real Academia Española to the American Association of Teachers of Spanish on the appearance of the first issue of its journal Hispania suggested:

The teaching of the language should aim to provide a broad knowledge of literary Spanish, considered as a highly regarded model; and [only] in an incidental way should it explain the slight variations that are exhibited in educated speech in Spain and in Spanish America, showing the essential unity of all within the literary pattern ... [And] in the specific case of teaching Spanish to foreigners, I see no reason to hesitate in imposing the pronunciation of the Castilian region.

— Ramón Menéndez Pidal, "La lengua española"

The priority of written language over spoken language, and of Peninsular Spanish over American varieties, was the central thesis of Menéndez Pidal's letter. The "barbaric character of the American indigenous languages", in his opinion, should prevent them from having any influence over American Spanish. The tutorship of the Academy would take care of the rest. With that, he was trying to counteract the prediction made by Venezuelan poet Andrés Bello in the prologue (p. xi) to his Grammar of 1847, which warned of the profusion of regional varieties that would "flood and cloud much of what is written in America, and, altering the structure of the language, tend to make it into a multitude of irregular, licencious, barbarian dialects". According to this interlocking linguistic and political viewpoint, only the unity of the "educated" language would guarantee the unity of the Hispanic world. On the other hand, the Colombian philologist Rufino José Cuervo—who shared Bello's prognosis of the eventual fragmentation of Spanish into a plurality of mutually unintelligible languages (although unlike Bello he celebrated it)—warned against the use of the written medium to measure the unity of the language, considering it a "veil that covers local speech".

This issue was documented poignantly in the 1935 treatise by Amado Alonso entitled El problema de la lengua en América (The problem of language in [Spanish] America), and was reiterated in 1941 when the scholar Américo Castro published La peculiaridad lingüística rioplatense y su sentido histórico (The linguistic peculiarity of River Plate Spanish and its historical significance). For writers of this viewpoint, the drift away from educated Castilian language was an unmistakable sign of social decay. Castro declared that the peculiarities of Argentine Spanish, especially the voseo, were symptoms of "universal plebeianism", "base instincts", "inner discontent, [and] resentment upon thinking about submitting to any moderately arduous rule". According to Castro's diagnosis, the strong identity of the Buenos Aires dialect was due to the general acceptance of popular forms at the expense of educated ones. Castro worries above all about the impossibility of immediately perceiving the social class of the speaker from the traits of his speech. The lack of the "checks and inhibitions" that the upper classes should represent seemed to him an unmistakable sign of social decay.

Castro's text is typical of a widespread view that sees the unity of language as the guardian of national unity, and the upper classes as the guardians of language orthodoxy. Much of Menéndez Pidal's work is aimed at pursuing that goal, recommending greater zeal in the persecution of "incorrect" usage through "the teaching of grammar, doctrinal studies, dictionaries, the dissemination of good models, [and] commentary on the classical authors, or, unconsciously, through the effective example that is propagated through social interaction and literary creation". This kind of classist centralism—common to other colonial languages, especially French—has had lasting influence on the use and teaching of the language. Only recently have some regional varieties (such as voseo in Argentina) become part of formal education and of the literary language—the latter, thanks largely to the literary naturalism of the mid-20th century.

== Present-day issues ==
The question of standard language took on new relevance with the rise of the mass media, when, for the first time, speakers of different dialects gained immediate access—by radio, television, and, more recently, the Internet—to language from regions speaking a variety different from their own. The weakness of the standard form's influence on spoken language had made standardization a marginal issue in the past, but it has now become an important subject for debate.

The lasting influence of linguistic centralism has led some commentators to claim that the problem of fragmentation is non-existent and that it is enough simply to emulate educated language. One author, for example, repeated the doctrine of Menéndez Pidal when stating that:

[i]t is possible that [speakers in] one or several of [the] mass media, at a particular moment, may give cause for concern because of their use of vernacular forms. ... [But f]rom moment to moment, society's needs and the cultural obligations appropriate to these media ... demand from [them] a higher level of culture, which includes raising speech to the most educated forms. Therefore they also will be, with greater and greater clarity, a strong force for the raising of the language [to a high standard] and for its unification.

In any event, in the sphere of spoken language, the issue has become problematic since at least the 1950s when the commercial demands on movie dubbing studios working with Hollywood films began to call for the development of a Spanish whose pronunciation, vocabulary, and grammatical features would not be recognizable as belonging to any particular country (español latino or español neutro, "Latin American Spanish" or "Neutral Spanish"). This goal soon proved to be an elusive one: even if the results could, on occasion, approximate a universally intelligible form, at the same time the process prevented the transmission of a familiar, intimate, or everyday tone. Disney Pictures took an early interest in unified dubbing. Three Little Pigs was dubbed in Paris by Castilian and French-accented actors. Snow White and the Seven Dwarfs and Pinocchio were dubbed in Argentina under Luis César Amadori. Later Disney films were dubbed in Mexico under Edmundo Santos. Nevertheless, its continued use has produced a degree of familiarization with a certain abstract phonetics throughout Spanish America. Dubbings made in Spain, are very particularly localized due to both the language politics of Francoist Spain and later assumptions by Spanish audiences. As Disney has re-issued its productions in newer media or to establish new copyrights, it has increased the number of dialectal versions. Sometimes this has backfired: parents who had watched The Little Mermaid with a pan-Hispanic dubbing disliked the re-dubbed Peninsular Spanish dubbing. Attempts by vocal coaches to cultivate a standardized “neutral” variety for live-action telenovela actors in the United States have in practice tended to result in actors talking in Mexican accents, as most Spanish speakers in the country are of Mexican origin or descent.

At the First International Congress of the Spanish Language, held in 1997 in Zacatecas, Mexico, controversy emerged around the concept of Standard Spanish. Some authors, such as the Spanish writer José Antonio Millán, advocated defining a "common Spanish", composed of the lowest common denominator of most dialects. Others, such as the journalist Fermín Bocos (director of Radio Exterior de España), denied the existence of a problem and expressed the idea of the supposed superiority of educated Castilian Spanish over dialects with more influence from other languages. Finally, experts from the Americas such as Lila Petrella stated that a neutral Spanish language could possibly be developed for use in purely descriptive texts, but that the major variations among dialects with regard to semantics and pragmatics would imply that it is impossible to define a single standard variety that would have the same linguistic value for all Spanish-speakers. Above all, certain grammatical structures are impossible to form in a neutral way, due to differences in the verb conjugations used (e.g. the use of the second-person familiar pronoun vos in Argentina, Uruguay, Paraguay, and Central American countries, while most other countries prefer tú, and most Colombians tend to use usted in the informal context—and all three pronouns require different verb conjugations). At least one of the three versions will always sound odd in any given Spanish-speaking country.

There has been concern that children exposed to media spoken in "Neutral Spanish" imitate it instead of local forms.
