= Peninsular Spanish =

Set of varieties of Spanish language

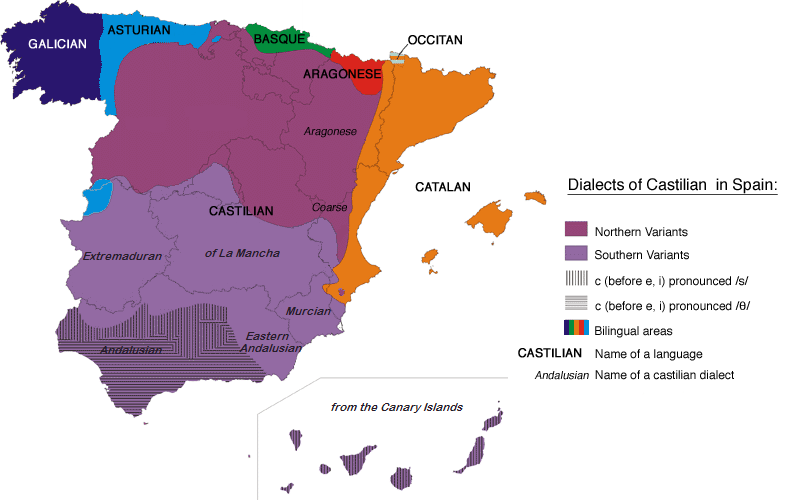
Dialects of peninsular Spanish and other languages of Spain

Peninsular Spanish (Spanish: español peninsular), also known as the Spanish of Spain (Spanish: español de España), European Spanish (Spanish: español europeo), or Iberian Spanish (Spanish: español ibérico), is the set of varieties of the Spanish language spoken in Peninsular Spain. This construct is often framed in opposition to varieties from the Americas and the Canary Islands.

From a phonological standpoint, there is a north-south gradient contrasting conservative and innovative pronunciation patterns. The former generally retain features such as /s/ – /θ/ distinction and realization of intervocalic /d/, whilst the latter may not. Processes of interaction and levelling between standard (a construct popularly perceived as based on northern dialects) and nonstandard varieties however involve ongoing adoption of conservative traits south and innovative ones north. In line with Spanish language's rich consonant fluctuation, other internal variation within varieties of Peninsular Spanish is represented by phenomena such as weakening of coda position -/s/, the defricativization of /tʃ/, realizations of /x/ as [x] and [h] and weakening or change of liquid consonants /l/ and /r/.

Morphologically, a notable feature in most varieties of Peninsular Spanish setting them apart from varieties from the Americas is the use of the pronoun vosotros (along with its oblique form os) and its corresponding verb forms for the second person plural familiar.

Language contact of Spanish with Catalan, Basque and Galician in the autonomous communities in which the latter languages are spoken notoriously involve borrowings at the lexical level, but also in the rest of the linguistic structure.

== Variants ==
Variation in Peninsular Spanish, especially phonetic, largely follows a north-south axis, often imagined or characterized as Castilian versus Andalusian in the popular imagination. That said, different isoglosses intersect and never exactly coincide with regional borders. The Spanish dialects of bilingual regions, such as Castrapo in Galicia or Catalan Spanish, have their own features due to language contact.

A simple, north-south division is:

- northern dialects (Castilian Spanish (including Madrid Spanish), Leonese Spanish, Cantabrian Spanish, Basque Spanish, Aragonese Spanish, Riojan Spanish, and Spanish-speaking Catalonia)
- southern dialects (Andalusian Spanish, Extremaduran Spanish, Manchegan Spanish, and Murcian Spanish)

Another north-south division would include a central-northern, found north of Madrid and equated with Castilian Spanish, a southern or Andalusian dialect, and an intermediary zone. This division does not include the Spanish of bilingual regions.

While a more narrow division includes the following dialect regions:

- northern Castile, including Salamanca, Valladolid, Burgos, and neighboring provinces;
- northern Extremadura and Leon, including the province of Cáceres, parts of Leon, western Salamanca province, and Zamora
- Galicia, referring to the Spanish spoken both monolingually and in contact with Galician
- Asturias, especially inland areas such as Oviedo
- the interior Cantabrian region, to the south of Santander
- the Basque Country, including Spanish as spoken monolingually and in contact with Basque
- Catalonia, including Spanish spoken in contact with Catalan
- southeastern Spain, including much of Valencia, Alicante, Murcia, Albacete, and southeastern La Mancha
- eastern Andalusia, including Granada, Almería, and surrounding areas
- western Andalusia, including Seville, Huelva, Cádiz, and the Extremaduran province of Badajoz – the Spanish of Gibraltar is also included
- south-central and southwest Spain, including areas to the south of Madrid such as Toledo and Ciudad Real.

The related term Castilian Spanish is often applied to formal varieties of Spanish as spoken in Spain.

According to folk tradition, the "purest" form of Peninsular Spanish is spoken in Valladolid, although the concept of "pure" languages has been rejected by modern linguists.

== Variation ==
Dialectal variation in the Peninsula follows both north-south and east-west axes.

Leísmo is native to a large swath of western Castile, as well as Cantabria and neighboring parts of Leon and Extremadura.

In much of eastern Castile, as well as Navarre, Aragon and Álava, the clitic pronoun se can express plural number, becoming sen, when it follows an infinitive, gerund, or subjunctive form used to express a command, as in casarsen 'to get married', siéntensen 'sit down'.

In an area of northern Spain, centered on Burgos, La Rioja, Álava and Vizcaya and also including Guipúzcoa, Navarra, Cantabria and Palencia, the imperfect subjunctive forms tend to be replaced by conditional ones.

In rural Aragon and Navarre, the cluster /tɾ/ is often realized as a voiceless alveolar non-sibilant affricate [tɹ̝̊], not unlike the initial consonant cluster in the English word trick. Similarly, the trilled /r/ may also be assibilated to [ɹ̝] in this region. The same pronunciations are also found in much of Hispanic America, especially Mexico, Central America, and the Andes.

In a chunk of northwestern Spain which includes Galicia and Bilbao and excludes Barcelona, Madrid, and Seville, the sequence /tl/ in words such as atleta 'athlete' and Atlántico 'Atlantic' is treated as an onset cluster, with both consonants being part of the same syllable. The same is true in the Canary Islands and most of Hispanic America, with the exception of Puerto Rico. On the other hand, in most of Peninsular Spanish, each consonant in /tl/ is considered as belonging to a separate syllable, and as a result the /t/ is subject to weakening. Thus, [aðˈlantiko], [aðˈleta] are the resulting pronunciations.

== Differences from Latin American Spanish ==
The Spanish language is a pluricentric language. Spanish is spoken in numerous countries around the world, each with differing standards. However, the Real Academia Española (Royal Spanish Academy), based in Madrid, Spain, is affiliated with the national language academies of 22 other hispanophone nations through the Association of Academies of the Spanish Language, and their coordinated resolutions are typically accepted in other countries, especially those related to spelling. Also, the Instituto Cervantes, an agency of the Government of Spain in charge of promoting the Spanish language abroad, has been adopted by other countries as the authority to officially recognize and certify the Spanish level of non-native Spanish speakers as their second language, as happens in Australia, South Korea or Switzerland.

The variants of Spanish spoken in Spain and its former colonies vary significantly in grammar and pronunciation, as well as in the use of idioms. Courses of Spanish as a second language commonly use Latin American Spanish in the United States and Canada, whereas European Spanish is typically preferred in Europe.

Dialects in central and northern Spain and Latin American Spanish contain several differences, the most apparent being Distinción (distinction), i.e., the pronunciation of the letter z before all vowels, and of c before e and i, as a voiceless dental fricative /θ/, as in English th in thing. Thus, in most varieties of Spanish from Spain, cinco, 'five' is pronounced /ˈθinko/ as opposed to /ˈsinko/ in Latin American Spanish, and similarly for zapato, 'shoe', cerdo, 'pig', zorro, 'fox', Zurbarán. A restricted form of distinción also occurs in the area around Cusco, Peru, where [θ] exists in words such as the numbers doce, 'twelve', and trece, 'thirteen'.

Additionally, all Hispanic American dialects drop the familiar (that is, informal) vosotros verb forms for the second person plural, using ustedes in all contexts. In most of Spain, ustedes is used only in a formal context.

Some other minor differences are:

- The widespread use of le instead of lo as the masculine direct object pronoun, especially referring to people. This morphological variation, known as leísmo, is typical of a strip of land in central Spain which includes Madrid, and recently it has spread to other regions.
- In the past, the sounds for ⟨y⟩ and ⟨ll⟩ were phonologically different in most European Spanish subvarieties, especially in the north, compared with only a few dialects in Hispanic America, but that difference is now beginning to disappear (yeísmo) in all Peninsular Spanish dialects, including the standard (that is, European Spanish based on the Madrid dialect). A distinct phoneme for ⟨ll⟩ is still heard in the speech of older speakers in rural areas throughout Spain, however, most Spanish-speaking adults and youngsters merge ⟨ll⟩ and ⟨y⟩. In Hispanic America, ⟨ll⟩ remains different from ⟨y⟩ in traditional dialects along the Andes range, especially in the Peruvian highlands, all of Bolivia and also in Paraguay. In the Philippines, speakers of Spanish and Filipino employ the distinction between ⟨ll⟩ /ʎ/ and ⟨y⟩ /ʝ/.
- In Spain, use of usted has declined in favor of tú; however, in Hispanic America, this difference is less noticeable among young people, especially in Caribbean dialects.
- In European Spanish, the letter ⟨j⟩ as well as the letter ⟨g⟩ before the letters ⟨i⟩ and ⟨e⟩ are pronounced as a stronger velar fricative /x/ and very often the friction is uvular [χ], while in Hispanic America they are generally guttural as well, but not as strong and the uvular realizations of European Spanish are not reported. In the Caribbean, Colombia, Venezuela, other parts of Hispanic America, the Canary Islands, Extremadura and most of western Andalusia, as well as in the Philippines, it is pronounced as [h].
- Characteristic of Spanish from Spain (except from Andalusia and the Canary Islands) is the voiceless alveolar retracted sibilant [s̺], also called apico-alveolar or grave, which is often perceived as intermediate between a laminal/dental [s] and [ʃ]. This sound is also prevalent in Colombian Paisa region, and Andean Spanish dialects.
- Debuccalization of syllable-final /s/ to [x], [h], or dropping it entirely, so that está [esˈta] ("s/he is") sounds like [ehˈta] or [eˈta], occurs in both Spain and the Americas. In Spain, this is most common in southern Spain: Andalusia, Extremadura, Murcia, Community of Madrid, La Mancha, etc., as well as in the Canary Islands; in the Americas it is the general pronunciation in most coastal and lowland regions.
- The sequence /tl/ is not a valid onset in European Spanish, unlike Latin American Spanish (particularly Mexican Spanish, where /tl/ is much more common). Thus, in Spain, words like Atlántico and atleta are pronounced according to the syllabication At-lán-ti-co and at-le-ta. Instead, in Mexico, the pronunciation follows the syllabication A-tlán-ti-co and a-tle-ta.
- voseo is the use of the second person singular informal pronoun vos which comes with different verb forms compared to tú. There are several sub-varieties of voseo within Hispanic America and many Hispanic American varieties do not have any form of voseo at all.

=== Vocabulary ===
The meaning of certain words may differ greatly between all the dialects of the language: carro refers to car in some Hispanic American dialects but to cart in Spain and some Hispanic American dialects. There also appear gender differences: el PC ('personal computer') in European Spanish and some Latin American Spanish, la PC in some Hispanic American Spanish, due to the widespread use of the gallicism ordenador (from ordinateur in French) for computer in Peninsular Spanish, which is masculine, instead of the Hispanic-American-preferred computadora, which is feminine, from the English word 'computer' (the exceptions being Colombia and Chile, where PC is known as computador, which is masculine).

Speakers from Hispanic America tend to use words and polite-set expressions that, even if recognized by the Real Academia Española, are not widely used nowadays (some of them are even deemed as anachronisms) by speakers of European Spanish. For example, enojarse and enfadarse are verbs with the same meaning (to become angry), enojarse being used much more in the Americas than in Spain, and enfadarse more in Spain than in the Americas. Below are select vocabulary differences between Spain and other Spanish-speaking countries. Words in bold are unique to Spain and not used in any other country (except for perhaps Equatorial Guinea which speaks a very closely related dialect, and to a lesser extent the Philippines).

Selected vocabulary differences
European Spanish	Latin American Spanish (Note: Latin American Spanish consists of several varieties spoken throughout the Americas so the examples may not represent all dialects. They are meant to show contrast and comparing all variants of Hispanic America as a whole to one variant of Spain would be impossible as the majority of the vocabulary will be reflected in other variants.)	English
vale	bien (universal), listo (Colombia), dale (Argentina), ya (Chile), (Peru), sale (Mexico)	okay
gafas	anteojos/lentes	eyeglasses/spectacles
**patata**/papa	papa	potato (papa also means poppet or child)
judía, alubia	frijol/frejol/caraota (Venezuela) / habichuela (Caribbean) / poroto	bean
jersey/chaleco	suéter/saco/pulóver	sweater
coche	auto/carro	car
conducir	manejar	to drive
**aparcar**/estacionar	estacionar/parquear	to park
**fregona**	trapeador, trapero, lampazo (Argentina, Uruguay), mopa, mapo (Puerto Rico)	mop
tarta	torta/pastel (Mexico, El Salvador) / queque/bizcocho (Puerto Rico)	cake
**ordenador**	computadora/computador	computer
**zumo**	jugo	juice
chulo/**guay**	chévere/chido/piola/copado/chulo/bacán/bacano	cool (slang)
cabezal	cabeza	head (of an apparatus)

== Bibliography ==
- Fernández-Ordóñez, Inés (2016). "Dialectos del Español Peninsular" (PDF). In Gutiérrez-Rexach, Javier (ed.). Enciclopedia de Lingüística Hispánica. Milton Park, Abingdon, Oxon: Routledge. ISBN 9781315713441. Archived from the original (PDF) on July 12, 2020.
- Penny, Ralph J. (2000). Variation and change in Spanish. Cambridge: Cambridge University Press. doi:10.1017/CBO9781139164566. ISBN 0521780454.
