= Personal pronouns in Spanish =

In Spanish, personal pronouns have distinct forms according to whether they stand for the subject (nominative) or object, and third-person pronouns make an additional distinction for direct object (accusative) or indirect object (dative), and for reflexivity as well. Several pronouns also have special forms used after prepositions.

Spanish is a pro-drop language with respect to subject pronouns, and, like many European languages, Spanish makes a T–V distinction in second person pronouns that has no equivalent in modern English. Object pronouns can be both clitic and non-clitic, with non-clitic forms carrying greater emphasis. With clitic pronouns, proclitic forms are much more common, but enclitic forms are mandatory in certain situations. There is significant regional variation in the use of personal pronouns, especially second-person pronouns.

== Table of personal pronouns ==
All the personal pronouns used in Spanish are outlined in the table below. Ladino, historically spoken by Sephardic Jews, employs some personal pronouns that have fallen out of use in Spanish.

Spanish personal pronouns
Number	Person	Nominative	Prepositional	Accusative	Dative	Genitive	Comitative
Singular	1st	yo	mí	me		mío(s)/mía(s)	conmigo
Singular	2nd	tú	ti	te		tuyo(s)/tuya(s)	contigo
Singular	2nd	vos ^{1}		te		tuyo(s)/tuya(s)	con vos ^{1}
Singular	2nd	usted		lo/la, se ^{3}	le, se ^{3}	suyo(s)/suya(s)	con usted, consigo ^{3}
Singular	3rd	él/ella/ello	él/ella/ello, sí ^{3}	lo/la, se ^{3}	le, se ^{3}	suyo(s)/suya(s)	con él/ella/ello, consigo ^{3}
Plural	1st	nosotros/nosotras		nos		nuestro(s)/nuestra(s)	con nosotros/nosotras
Plural	2nd	vosotros/vosotras ^{2}		os ^{2}		vuestro(s)/vuestra(s) ^{2}	con vosotros/vosotras ^{2}
Plural	2nd	ustedes		los/las, se ^{3}	les, se ^{3}	suyo(s)/suya(s)	con ustedes, consigo ^{3}
Plural	3rd	ellos/ellas	ellos/ellas, sí ^{3}	los/las, se ^{3}	les, se ^{3}	suyo(s)/suya(s)	con ellos/ellas, consigo ^{3}

^{1} Only in countries with voseo; Ladino has vos as the formal form, instead of usted.
^{2} Primarily in Spain; elsewhere, ustedes is used in the plural regardless of the level of formality.
^{3} Reflexive

Usted may be abbreviated as Ud. or Vd. A disused equivalent of vuestro(s)/vuestra(s) is voso(s)/vosa(s).

== Subject pronouns ==
=== Pronoun dropping and grammatical gender ===
Spanish is a pro-drop language with respect to subject pronouns. Information contained in verb endings often renders the explicit use of subject pronouns unnecessary and even erroneous although they may still be used for clarity or emphasis:

- Yo hago or just Hago = "I do"
- Ellos vieron or just Vieron = "They saw"

English subject pronouns are generally not translated into Spanish if neither clarity nor emphasis is an issue. "I think" is generally translated as just Creo unless the speaker contrasts their views with those of someone else or places emphasis on the fact that their views are their own and not somebody else's.

Third-person masculine and feminine pronouns (él, ella, ellos, and ellas) can refer to grammatically masculine and feminine objects as well as people, but their explicit use as subjects is somewhat uncommon, and restricted to people. The third-person neuter singular pronoun ello is likewise rarely used as an explicit subject in everyday language, although such usage is found in formal and literary contexts. Quite unusually among European languages, the first- and second-person plural subject pronouns (nosotros/nosotras and vosotros/vosotras, respectively) inflect for gender: nosotros and vosotros are used to refer to groups of men (as well as mixed-gender groups), while nosotras and vosotras are used exclusively to refer to groups of women.

=== Tú/vos and usted ===
Like French and other languages with the T–V distinction, modern Spanish has a distinction in its second-person pronouns that has no equivalent in modern English. The most basic is the difference between tú (vos in areas with voseo) and usted: tú or vos is the "familiar" form, and usted, derived from the third-person form "your grace" (vuestra merced), is the "polite" form. The appropriate usage of those forms is fundamental to interpersonal communication.

The usage of Tú/Vos and Usted depends on a number of factors, such as the number of people with whom the speaker is talking, the formality or informality of the relationship between the speaker and the other person, the age difference between them, and the regional variation of Spanish.

Using the usted form to address someone implies that the person addressed is a social superior, someone to whom respect is owed, or someone with whom one does not have a close relationship. In contrast, the use of tú or vos implies that the person addressed is an equal, a comrade, a friend, someone with whom one has a close relationship, or a child or other social inferior, including (traditionally) a maid or other household employee. Tú is also used to address God, in parallel with English's otherwise-abandoned use of thou. Usage changed in the 20th century in Spain, and a woman who addressed her mother as madre, 'mother' using usted could experience that her children call her mamá, 'mom' and use tú. Also, in Spain the Falangists and the Communists promoted the tuteo as a sign of worker solidarity.

One can give offense by addressing someone with tú instead of usted, similar to inappropriately calling someone by their first name in English; conversely, it can also be awkward to use usted if tú would be expected, which suggests too much social distance or implies that the person addressed is being haughty. Spanish has a verb, tutear, meaning to use the familiar form tú to address a person. If speakers feel that the relationship with the conversant has evolved, sometimes only after a few minutes of conversation, to a point that a shift from usted to tú is desirable, they often confirm that by asking if it is acceptable: Nos tuteamos, ¿verdad? or ¿Te puedo tutear? is fairly common. In Anglophone countries, that would be roughly analogous to asking if it is acceptable to call someone by their first name.

In the plural, in Spain (other than the Canary Islands and parts of western Andalusia), the usage of the familiar vosotros/vosotras and the polite ustedes is identical to the usage of tú/usted. In the Canary Islands as well as those parts of western Andalusia, in addition to all of Spanish America, vosotros is not used except in very formal contexts such as oratory, and ustedes is the familiar as well as the polite plural.

The distinction extends to other types of pronouns and modifiers: when using usted, one must also use the third-person object pronouns (except in some Andalusian dialects) and possessive adjectives:

- Te lavas means "you wash yourself" in the familiar singular, while se lava can mean "you wash yourself" in the polite singular, as well as "he/she/it washes himself/herself/itself".
- Tu casa (Note: Tú with an (acute) accent is the subject pronoun, tu with no accent is a possessive adjective.) means "your house" in the familiar singular, while su casa can mean "your house" in the polite singular, as well as "his/her/their house".

=== Impersonal pronouns ===
There are several impersonal pronouns in Spanish:

- uno ('one', as well as una for women), which declines as a normal third-person pronoun and is treated as such for purposes of conjugation and reflexivity.
- Many ideas that would be expressed with an impersonal pronoun in English would more often be expressed with so-called pasiva refleja (passive reflexive) constructions in Spanish: "That is not done" (Eso no se hace), rather than "You (One) wouldn't do that" (Uno no hace eso).
- Impersonal tú might be a recent phenomenon. It is conjugated with the second-person but is not directed to the listener. According to one scholar, it might have appeared in the Valencian Community around the 1940s. It is used very often in speech in Spain: A veces te ilusionas con cosas y las pierdes., 'Sometimes you rave about things and lose them.'

== Reflexive pronouns and intensifiers ==
The third person is the only person with a distinct reflexive pronoun: se. In the first and second persons, the normal object pronouns are used. Thus, the reflexive forms are:

Singular		Plural	
yo	me	nosotros/nosotras	nos
tú/vos	te	vosotros/vosotras	os
él/ella/ello/usted	se	ellos/ellas/ustedes	se

The reflexive pronoun is used with pronominal verbs, also known as reflexive verbs. These verbs require the use of the reflexive pronoun, appropriate to the subject. Some transitive verbs can take on a reflexive meaning, such as lavar (to wash) and lavarse (to wash oneself). Other verbs have reflexive forms which do not take on a reflexive meaning, such as ir (to go) and irse (to go away). Some verbs only have reflexive forms, such as jactarse (to boast).

The nominal intensifier in Spanish (equivalent to English "myself", "yourself", "themselves", etc. when used after a noun) is mismo, which in this case is placed after the noun it modifies and behaves like a normal adjective. Thus:

- Yo mismo lo hice = "I [masc.] myself did it"
- No entiendo porque necesitas la cosa misma = "I don't understand why you need the thing itself"
- Dáselo a los hombres mismos = "Give it to the men themselves"
- A nosotros no nos gustan las chicas mismas = "We don't like the girls themselves" (lit. "The girls themselves don't please us")

Unlike English intensifiers, which are often placed several words after the noun they modify (e.g. "I did it myself"), Spanish intensifiers must come immediately after the noun they modify.

== Object pronouns ==
Object pronouns are personal pronouns that take the function of an object in the sentence. Spanish object pronouns may be both clitic and non-clitic; the clitic form is the unstressed form, and the non-clitic form, which is formed with the preposition a ("to") and the prepositional case, is the stressed form. Clitics cannot function independently and must attach to a host (either a verb or preposition). Clitic pronouns are generally proclitic, i.e. they appear before the verb of which they are the object. Enclitic pronouns (i.e. pronouns attached to the end of the verb (or related word) itself) most often appear with positive imperatives and may appear with infinitives and gerunds as well. In all compound infinitives that make use of the past participle, enclitics attach to the uninflected auxiliary verb and not the past participle(s) itself.

In Spanish, two (and rarely three) clitic pronouns can be used with a single verb, generally one accusative and one dative. They follow a specific order based primarily on person:

1	2	3	4
se	te os	me nos	lo, la, los, las, le, les

Thus:

- Él me lo dio = "He gave it to me"
- Ellos te lo dijeron = "They said it to you"
- Yo te me daré = "I will give myself to you"
- Vosotros os nos presentasteis = "You [pl.] introduced yourselves to us"
- Se le perdieron los libros = "The books disappeared on him" (lit. "The books got lost to him")

The full and pronominal form of a reduplicated direct object must agree in gender and number:

- A las tropas las dirige César. = "Caesar directs the troops."

When an accusative third-person non-reflexive pronoun (lo, la, los, or las) is used with a dative pronoun that is understood to also be third-person non-reflexive (le or les), the dative pronoun is replaced by se. Simple non-emphatic clitic doubling is most often found with dative clitics, although it is occasionally found with accusative clitics as well. In a wide area in central Spain, including Madrid, there exists the practice of leísmo; which is, using the indirect object pronoun le for the object pronoun where Standard Spanish would use lo (masculine) or la (feminine) for the object pronoun.

== Genitive pronouns ==
Genitive pronouns describe to whom something belongs or of whom (or sometimes what) something is a characteristic or property. They are analogous to English "mine", "yours", "his", "hers", etc., and unlike their English counterparts, they inflect for gender and number according to the thing possessed (not the possessor itself) and are generally used with the definite article:

- Mi coche es más grande que el tuyo = "My car is bigger than yours"
- Tu casa tiene más cuartos que la suya = "Your house has more rooms than his/hers/yours/theirs"
- Estos libros son más interesantes que los vuestros = "These books are more interesting than yours [pl.]"
- Esas camisas son más pequeñas que las nuestras = "Those shirts are smaller than ours"

After ser, however, the definite article is usually omitted:

- Este coche es mío = "This car is mine"
- Esta camisa es suya = "This shirt is his/hers/yours/theirs"

To avoid ambiguity in the meaning of suyo, it may be replaced by de + the appropriate pronoun:

- Estos pantalones son más largos que los de él = "These pants are longer than his"
- Esta camisa es de ella = "This shirt is hers"

The neuter article lo can also be used with genitive pronouns to express the concept of "what is mine", "what is yours", "what is his", etc.: lo mío, lo tuyo, lo suyo, etc.

Genitive pronouns are identical in form to long-form possessive adjectives, which may be placed after the noun to place emphasis on the fact of possession.

== Old forms ==
=== Formal vos ===
The pronoun vos was once used as a respectful form of address, semantically equivalent to modern usted. It used the same conjugations as modern vosotros (see below) and also the oblique form os and the possessive vuestro/-a/-os/-as. However, unlike vosotros, which always refers to more than one person, vos was usually singular in meaning. The modern voseo of several countries (see below) derives from vos but has become a generic form of address instead of a specifically respectful form. Vos and its related forms are still used in literature, cinema, etc., when attempting to depict the language of past centuries.

== Regional variation ==
=== Voseo ===
The pronoun "vos" is used in some areas of Latin America, particularly in Central America, Argentina, Uruguay, Paraguay, Chile, the state of Zulia in Venezuela, and the Andean regions of Colombia, Bolivia, Perú, and Ecuador. These are all distant from the large Spanish colonial cities, like Mexico City, Cartagena (Colombia), and Lima.

In some areas, like the River Plate region, vos has become the only generic form of address for the second-person singular, that is, it has the same meaning that tú has elsewhere (informal and intimate). In other areas, like Chile, it persists as a fairly stigmatized form alongside the more prestigious tú. In some other areas, it is employed among equals but not for very close people (couples or family) or to inferiors (children, animals etc.), where the pronoun tú would normally be used.

Ladino uses vos as well but uses it as in Old Spanish (see above), that is, as a respectful form of address, equivalent to how usted is used elsewhere. In fact, Ladino does not use usted at all because vos implies the same respect that it once had in Old Spanish. In Ladino, tú is used towards anyone in an informal manner.

In the local Spanish-based creole, Chavacano, the use of vos coexists alongside tú and usted depending on level of intimacy, commonality, and formality.

=== The use of vusted and vuestra merced ===
The variant vusted/vustedes is mostly a regionalism in some countries in South America. It is common in isolated areas of Colombia and Venezuela. Other speakers consider it archaic because it is an older form of a contraction of vuestra merced. Over time, vuestra merced shifted from an honorific noun phrase to a pronoun through a process of phonetic reduction and grammaticalization, with commonly described intermediate forms such as vuesarced and vusted before the standardized form usted became dominant in most varieties of Spanish. Some regional speech communities preserve these transitional or related forms. In parts of Colombia, su merced remains in use and may function interchangeably with usted as a respectful form of address. Su merced can also appear in the vocative case when addressing an older person, as in Su merced, ¿por qué no vienen vusted y sus nietos a mi casa esta tarde?

Vuestra merced (literally "your grace") is the origin of usted, usarcé and similar forms that govern third-person verb forms with a second-person function. They are now confined mostly to period works.

It is unlikely that the similar-sounding Arabic أستاذ (ʾustāḏ), meaning "professor", was involved in the formation of Spanish usted because of the weakness of the semantic link and the fact that usted is not documented before 1598, (Note: See the online Corpus del Español, for example) over a century after the fall of Moorish Granada.

=== Use of vosotros ===
Today, the informal second-person plural pronoun vosotros is widely used by Spaniards except in some southwestern regions and in most of the Canary Islands, where its use is rare. Among the former colonies of the Spanish Empire, the use of vosotros and its normal conjugations is also retained in the Philippines and Equatorial Guinea. (Note: In José Rizal's Noli Me Tangere, Salomé uses vosotros to refer to Elías and his passengers that day. In its sequel, El filibusterismo, in the chapter entitled Risas, llantos, Sandoval addresses his fellow students using vosotros.) In the Ladino of Sephardic Jews, the only second person plural is vozotros (i.e. there is no ustedes, as in standard Spanish).

Throughout Latin America, the second person plural pronoun ustedes is almost always used orally in both formal (singular usted) and informal (singular tú/vos) contexts. However, vosotros and its related forms are not unheard of in Latin America. The use of vosotros was more widespread in formal, educated speech in Hispanic America around the time of the Spanish American wars of independence.

Even in modern times, the use of vosotros may still be found in oratory, legal documents, or other highly formal or archaic contexts in Latin America. Spanish studies scholar Daniel Eisenberg has noted that because the "use of archaic Spanish can give an impression of authority and wisdom", Latin American Spanish speakers will sometimes use vosotros to achieve a specific rhetorical effect; he observed that the notion "that vosotros is not used in Spanish America is one of the great myths of Spanish language instruction, at least in the U.S.", citing as an example the following quote, which employs the genitive (possessive) form of the word, vuestro:

Más de un batallón de los vuestros, invasor rubio, habrá mordido el polvo de mis agrestes montañas.

transl. More than a battalion of yours, blonde invader, will have bitten the dust of my rugged mountains.

— Augusto César Sandino, quoted on a Nicaraguan billboard

=== Creoles ===
Forms based on vosotros and vos are used in many Spanish-based creole languages.

In Chavacano, spoken in the Philippines, vo is used alongside tu as a singular second-person pronoun in Zamboangueño, Caviteño, and Ternateño. In Zamboangueño, evos is also used. For the plural, Zamboangueño has vosotros while Caviteño has vusos. Papiamento, spoken in Aruba, Bonaire, and Curaçao, maintains boso (singular) and bosonan (plural). Since it was used with slaves, the forms that seemed disrespectful in the rest of America were common.

== Other forms ==
=== Menda ===
Menda is the equivalent of I in Caló, where it is concords in first person singular. In Spanish slang such as Cheli, el menda ♂ /la menda ♀ can be used as an emphatic I, concording with a third person verb, but its use is receding.

=== Servidor ===
Un servidor, este servidor or simply servidor for the masculine gender and una servidora, esta servidora, servidora for the feminine are nouns meaning "servant" but used with the singular third-person verb as a polite, distancing, or humorous first-person pronoun, e.g. ¿Quién es el siguiente? - ¡Servidor!, 'Who is next? - [humbly] Me!', Servidora está harta de usted., '[Disdainfully] I am fed up with you.' In this sense, it is roughly analogous to the English phrase "yours truly".

=== Neopronouns ===
Non-binary people in Spanish-speaking countries use many personal pronouns in place of gendered ones. It is common to substitute the "a" in ella/la, ellas/las, suya/suyas, nosotras, and vosotras with the letters "e", "i", "u", or "oa", and in writing with "x", "*", "@", "æ", and "_". Other gender-neutral forms include il/li, ól/ol, and xelle/le.

== See also ==
- Spanish grammar
