= Andalusian Spanish =

Variety of Spanish language

- Pronunciation: Spanish pronunciation: [andaˈluh, ændæˈlʊ]
- Region: Andalusia
- Ethnicity: Andalusians, Gibraltarians
- Native speakers: 8–10 million (2020)
- Language family: Indo-European: Italic; Latino-Faliscan; Latin; Romance; Italo-Western; Western; Iberian; West Iberian; Castilian; Spanish; Peninsular Spanish; Andalusian Spanish
- Early forms: Old Latin: Vulgar Latin; Proto-Romance; Old Spanish; Early Modern Spanish
- Dialects: Western Andalusian; Eastern Andalusian; Llanito
- Writing system: Latin (Spanish alphabet); Spanish Braille

Language codes
- ISO 639-3: –
- Glottolog: anda1279

The Andalusian Spanish dialects (Spanish: andaluz, pronounced [andaˈluθ], locally [andaˈluh, ændæˈlʊ]) are spoken in Andalusia, Ceuta, Melilla, and Gibraltar. They include perhaps the most distinct of the southern variants of peninsular Spanish, differing in many respects from northern varieties in a number of phonological, morphological and lexical features. Many of these are innovations which, spreading from Andalusia, failed to reach the higher strata of Toledo and Madrid speech and become part of the Peninsular norm of standard Spanish. Andalusian Spanish has historically been stigmatized at a national level, though this appears to have changed in recent decades, and there is evidence that the speech of Seville or the norma sevillana enjoys high prestige within Western Andalusia.

Due to the large population of Andalusia, Andalusian dialects are among the most widely spoken dialects in Spain. Within the Iberian Peninsula, other southern varieties of Spanish share some core elements of Andalusian, mainly in terms of phonetics – notably Extremaduran Spanish and Murcian Spanish as well as, to a lesser degree, Manchegan Spanish.

Due to massive emigration from Andalusia to the Spanish colonies in the Americas and elsewhere, all Latin American Spanish dialects share some fundamental characteristics with Western Andalusian Spanish, such as the use of ustedes instead of vosotros for the second person informal plural, seseo, and a lack of leísmo. Much of Latin American Spanish shares some other Andalusian characteristics too, such as yeísmo, weakening of syllable-final /s/, pronunciation of historical /x/ or the ⟨j⟩ sound as a glottal fricative, and merging syllable-final /r/ and /l/. Canarian Spanish is also strongly similar to Western Andalusian Spanish due to its settlement history.

== Phonology ==
Consonant phonemes
	Labial		Dental		Alveolar		Palatal		Velar	
Nasal		m				n		ɲ		
Stop	p	b	t	d			tʃ	ʝ	k	ɡ
Continuant	f	b	θ*	d	s			ʝ	x	ɡ
Lateral						l		(ʎ)		
Flap						ɾ				
Trill						r				

=== Sibilants ===
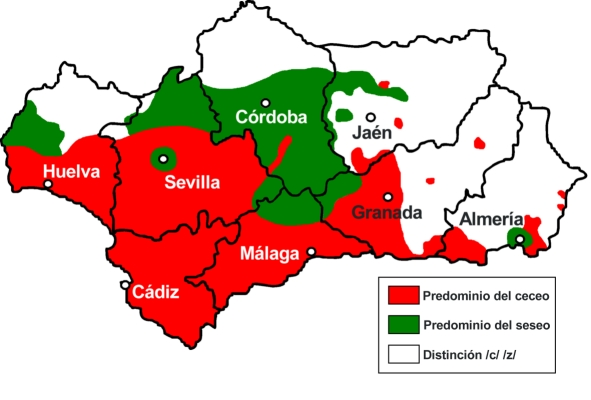
Areas of Andalusia in which seseo (green), ceceo (red), or the distinction of c/z and s (white) predominate.

Most Spanish dialects in Spain differentiate, at least in pre-vocalic position, between the sounds represented in traditional spelling by ⟨z⟩ and ⟨c⟩ (before ⟨e⟩ and ⟨i⟩), pronounced [θ], and that of ⟨s⟩, pronounced [s]. However, in many areas of Andalusia, the two phonemes are not distinguished and /s/ is used for both, which is known as seseo /seˈseo/. In other areas, the sound manifests as [s̟] (a sound close, but not identical to [θ]), which is known as ceceo (/θeˈθeo/). Unless a specific dialect is transcribed, transcriptions in this article follow the standard pattern found in the syllable onset, so that the orthographic ⟨z⟩ and the soft ⟨c⟩ are transcribed with ⟨θ⟩, whereas the orthographic ⟨s⟩ is transcribed with ⟨s⟩. Additionally, in most regions of Andalusia which distinguish /s/ and /θ/, the distinction involves a laminal [s], as opposed to the apico-alveolar [s̠] of most of Spain.

The pronunciation of these sounds in Andalusia differs geographically, socially, and among individual speakers, and there has also been some shift in favor of the standard distinción. As testament to the prevalence of intra-speaker variation, Dalbor (1980) found that many Andalusians alternate between a variety of sibilants, with little discernible pattern. Additionally, the idea that areas of rural Andalusia at one time exclusively used ceceo has been challenged, and many speakers described as ceceante or ceceo-using have in fact alternated between use of [s̟] and [s] with little pattern. While ceceo is stigmatized and usually associated with rural areas, it is worth noting that it was historically found in some large cities such as Huelva and Cádiz, although not in the more prestigious cities of Seville and Córdoba.

Above all in eastern Andalusia, but also in locations in western Andalusia such as Huelva, Jerez, and Seville, there is a shift towards distinción. Higher rates of distinción are associated with education, youth, urban areas, and monitored speech. The strong influence of media and school may be driving this shift.

Penny (2000) provides a map showing the different ways of pronouncing these sounds in different parts of Andalusia. The map's information almost entirely corresponds to the results from the Linguistic Atlas of the Iberian Peninsula, realized in the early 1930s in Andalusia and also described in Navarro Tomás, Espinosa & Rodríguez-Castellano (1933). These sources generally highlight the most common pronunciation, in colloquial speech, in a given locality.

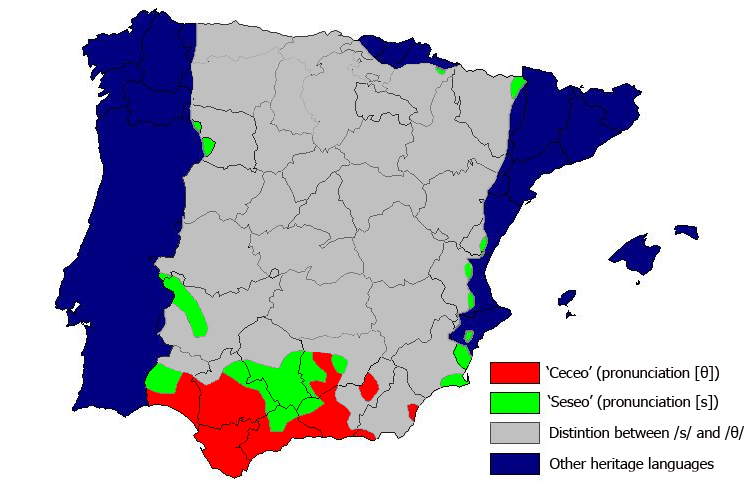
'Seseo' and 'ceceo' in European Spanish

According to Penny (2000), the distinction between a laminal /s/ and /θ/ is native to most of Almería, eastern Granada, most of Jaén, and northern Huelva, while the distinction between an apical /s/ and /θ/, as found in the rest of Peninsular Spanish, is native to the very northeastern regions of Almería, Granada and Jaén, to northern Córdoba, not including the provincial capital, and to a small region of northern Huelva. Also according to Penny (2000) and Navarro Tomás, Espinosa & Rodríguez-Castellano (1933), seseo predominates in much of northwestern Huelva, the city of Seville as well as northern Seville province, most of southern Córdoba, including the capital, and parts of Jaén, far western Granada, very northern Málaga, and the city of Almería. Likewise, ceceo is found in southern Huelva, most of Seville, including an area surrounding but not including the capital, all of Cádiz including the capital, most of Málaga, western Granada, and parts of southern Almería.

Outside Andalusia, seseo also existed in parts of western Badajoz, including the capital, as of 1933, though it was in decline in many places and associated with the lower class. Seseo was likewise found, in 1933, in a southern, coastal area of Murcia around the city of Cartagena, and in parts of southern Alicante such as Torrevieja, near the linguistic border with Valencian. Ceceo was also found in the Murcian villages of Perín and Torre-Pacheco, also near the coast.

=== Other general features ===
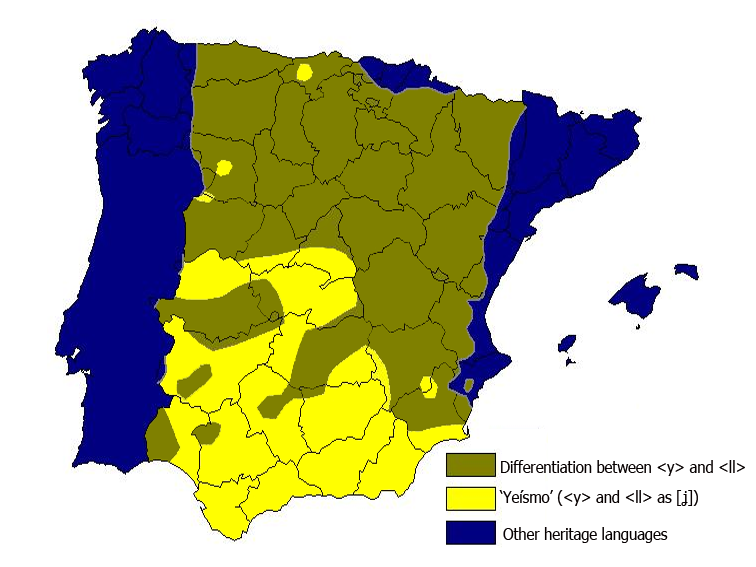
Areas with 'yeísmo' (<ll> pronounced as [ʝ]) in European Spanish

Andalusian Spanish phonology includes a large number of other distinctive features, compared to other dialects. Many of these are innovations, especially lenitions and mergers, and some of Andalusian Spanish's most distinct lenitions and mergers occur in the syllable coda. Most broadly, these characteristics include yeísmo, the pronunciation of the ⟨j⟩ sound like the English [h], velarization of word- and phrase-final /n/ to [ŋ], elision of /d/ between vowels, and a number of reductions in the syllable coda, which includes occasionally merging the consonants /l/ and /r/ and leniting or even eliding most syllable-final consonants. A number of these features, so characteristic of Spain's south, may have ultimately originated in Astur-leonese speaking areas of north-western Spain, where they can still be found.

The leniting of syllable-final consonants is quite frequent in middle-class speech, and some level of lenition is sociolinguistically unmarked within Andalusia, forming part of the local standard. That said, Andalusian speakers do tend to reduce the rate of syllable-final lenition in formal speech.

Yeísmo, or the merging of /ʎ/ into /ʝ/, is general in most of Andalusia, and may likely be able to trace its origin to Astur-leonese settlers. That said, pockets of a distinction remain in rural parts of Huelva, Seville, and Cadiz. This merger has since spread to most of Latin American Spanish, Canarian Spanish and, in recent decades, to most of urban Peninsular Spanish.

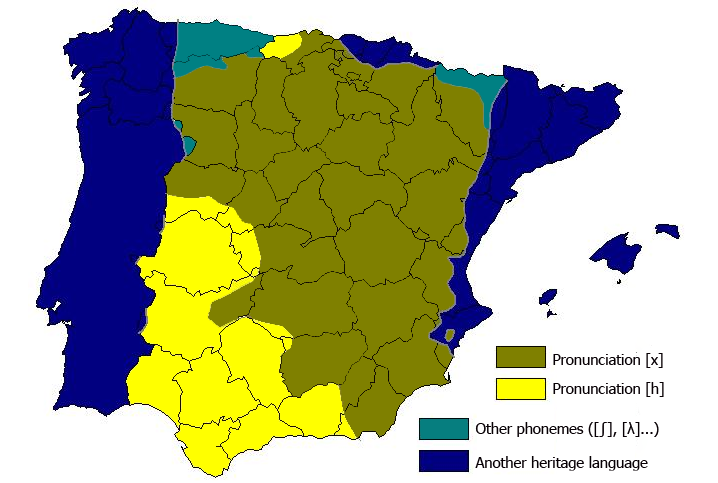
Pronunciation of <j> in European Spanish

/x/ is usually aspirated, or pronounced [h], except in some eastern Andalusian sub-varieties (i.e. Jaén, Granada, Almería provinces), where the dorsal [x] is retained. This aspirated pronunciation is also heard in most of Extremadura and parts of Cantabria.

Word-final /n/ often becomes a velar nasal [ŋ], including when before another word starting in a vowel, as in [meðãˈŋasko] for me dan asco 'they disgust me'. This features is shared with many other varieties of Spanish, including much of Latin America and the Canary Islands, as well as much of northwestern Spain, the likely origin of this velarization. This syllable-final nasal can even be deleted, leaving behind just a nasal vowel at the end of a word.

Intervocalic /d/ is elided in most instances, for example pesao for pesado ('heavy'), a menúo for a menudo ('often'). This is especially common in the past participle; e.g. he acabado becomes he acabao ('I have finished'). For the -ado suffix, this feature is common to all peninsular variants of Spanish, while in other positions it is widespread throughout most of the southern half of Spain. Also, as occurs in most of the Spanish-speaking world, final /d/ is usually dropped. This widespread elision of intervocalic /d/ throughout the vocabulary is also shared with several Asturian and Cantabrian dialects, pointing to a possible Asturian origin for this feature.

One conservative feature of Andalusian Spanish is the way some people retain an [h] sound in words which had such a sound in medieval Spanish, which originally comes from Latin /f/, i.e. Latin fartvs 'stuffed, full' → harto [ˈharto] (standard Spanish [ˈarto] 'fed up'). This also occurs in the speech of Extremadura and some other western regions, and it was carried to Latin America by Andalusian settlers, where it also enjoys low status. Nowadays, this characteristic is limited to rural areas in Western Andalusia and the flamenco culture. This pronunciation represents resistance to the dropping of /h/ that occurred in Early Modern Spanish. This [h] sound is merged with the /x/ phoneme, which derives from medieval /ʃ/ and /ʒ/. This feature may be connected to northwestern settlers during the reconquista, who came from areas such as eastern Asturias where /f/ had, as in Old Castile, become /h/.

/tʃ/ undergoes deaffrication to [ʃ] in Western Andalusia, including cities like Seville and Cádiz, e.g. escucha [ehˈkuʃa] ('s/he listens').

=== Coda obstruents and liquids ===
A list of Andalusian lenitions and mergers in the syllable coda that affect obstruent and liquid consonants includes:

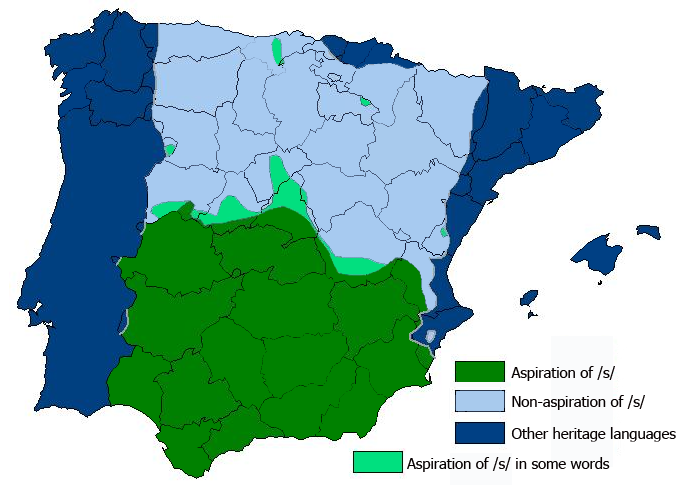
Aspiration of /s/ at the syllable coda

- Syllable-final /s/, /x/ and /θ/ (where ceceo or distinción occur) are usually aspirated (pronounced [h]) or deleted. The simple aspiration of final /s/ as [h] occurs in the speech of all social classes within Andalusia, and is the most widespread form of /s/-lenition outside Andalusia. S-aspiration is general in all of the southern half of Spain, and now becoming common in the northern half too.
- Word-final /s/ can also be pronounced as [h], or elided entirely, before a following word that starts with a vowel sound, like [laˈhola(h)] for las olas 'the waves'. This can also occur at morpheme boundaries within a word, as in nosotros being pronounced [noˈhotɾo(h)]
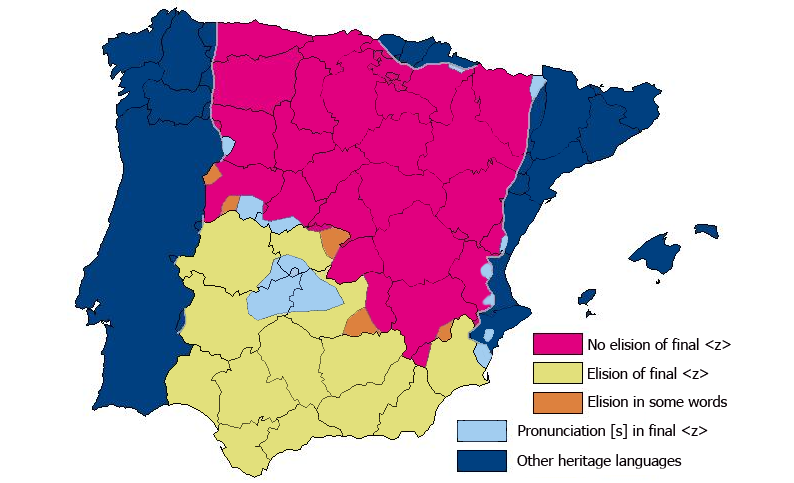
  Pronunciation of <z> at the end of a word in European Spanish
  .
- In Eastern Andalusian dialects, as well as in Murcian Spanish, the preceding vowel becomes lax when before an underlying elided obstruent. This results in /a/ fronting to [æ], while the other vowels are lowered. Thus, in these varieties one distinguishes casa [ˈkasa] ('house') and casas [ˈkæsæ] ('houses') by vowel quality, whereas northern Spanish speakers would have central vowels in both words and a terminal alveolar [s] in casas.
  - There is disagreement as to whether or not /i, u/ are affected by this process, although most evidence shows they are lowered to a moderate degree.
  - The quality of word-final lax /a/, typically transcribed [æ], differs according to a number of geographic and social factors. It may be lower than a typical word-final /a/, or it may instead simply be fronted. In some towns, in the mid-20th century at least, it overlapped with the quality of, or even merged with, [ɛ], the lax allophone of /e/.
  - As a result, these varieties have five vowel phonemes, each with a tense allophone (roughly the same as the normal realization in northern Spanish; [ä], [e̞], [i], [o̞], [u], hereafter transcribed without diacritics) and a lax allophone ([æ], [ɛ], [ɪ], [ɔ], [ʊ]). In addition to this, a process of vowel harmony may take place where tense vowels that precede a lax vowel may become lax themselves, e.g. trébol [ˈtɾeβol] ('clover, club') vs tréboles [ˈtɾɛβɔlɛ] ('clovers, clubs').
  - Traditionally, these varieties were considered to have eight distinct vowel phonemes—/a, e, i, o, u/, as well as the lax /æ, ɛ, ɔ/ (the aforementioned allophones of /a, e, o/). More recently, it has been postulated that Eastern Andalusian could have ten – five tense, five lax – or even up to fourteen phonemes: /a, as, aθ, ar, e, e{s, θ, r}, i, i{s, θ, r}, o, os, oθ, or, u, u{s, θ, r}/. Indeed, at least in /a, o/, depending on whether it is coda-position /s/, /θ/, or /r/ that is lost, a different vowel that arises, which along with other factors (gemination for example) plays a significant role in distinguishing minimal pairs.
- Liquids (/r l/) can be aspirated as well. Also, liquids and obstruents (/b d ɡ p t k f s x θ/) often assimilate to the following consonant, producing gemination; e.g. perla [ˈpehla]~[ˈpelːa] ('pearl'), carne [ˈkahne]~[ˈkãnːe] ('meat'), adquirí [ahkiˈɾi]~[akːiˈɾi] ('I acquired'), mismo [ˈmihmo]~[ˈmĩmːo] ('same'), desde [ˈdɛhðe]~[ˈdɛðːe] ('from'), rasgos [ˈrahɣɔh]~[ˈræxːɔ] ('traits').
- In Andalusian Spanish a voiced obstruent may assimilate the voicelessness of a preceding /s/, while that same /s/ may assimilate the place of articulation of the following consonant. As a result, both merge as a single voiceless consonant; Thus, /s/ is often assimilated to [ɸ] before /b/ (/sb/ → [hβ] → [hɸ] → [ɸː]), as in desbaratar → *effaratar [ɛhɸaɾaˈta]~[ɛɸːaɾaˈta] ('to ruin, to disrupt'), to [θ] before /d/, as in [lo θeˈβaneh] los desvanes 'the attics', and to [x] beore /g/, as in rasgo [raxːo] 'feature'. This kind of devoicing is less widespread, geographically and socially, than simple assimilation.
- Final /s/ may also become [ɹ] (where ceceo or distinción occur) before /θ/ (/sθ/ → [ɹθ]), as in ascensor
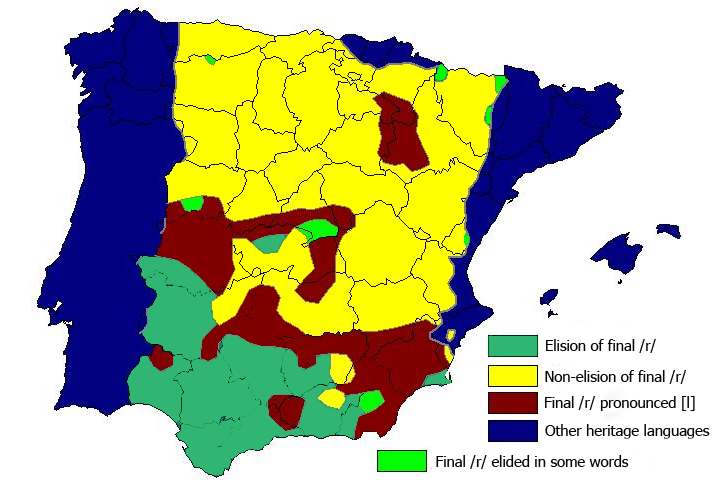
  Pronunciation of /r/ at the end of a word in European Spanish
  [aɹθẽnˈso] ('lift').
- Mainly in Western Andalusia, /s/-aspiration can result in post-aspiration of following voiceless stops, as in /resto/ pronounced [ˈretʰo].
  - As a likely related change, -/st/- may be pronounced as an affricate [ts]. This change is recent, being led by young women, and is present at least in Seville and Antequera.
- Intervocalic /p/, /t/, /k/ are usually voiced, especially in male speech, and can even become approximants. This means much of the phonetic distinction between intervocalic /p/, /t/, /k/ and /sp/ /st/ /sk/ is in fact maintained by differences in voicing and post-aspiration.
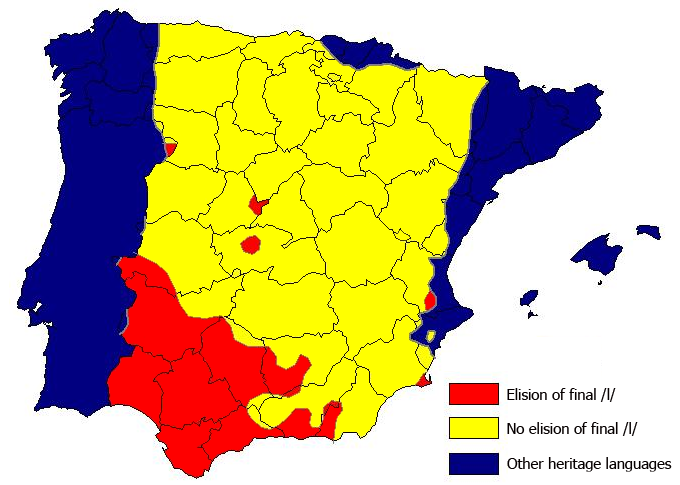
- Elision of /l/ at the end of a word in European Spanish
  /l/ may be pronounced as /r/ in syllable-final position, as in [ˈarma] instead of [ˈalma] for alma ('soul') or [er] instead of [el] for el ('the'). The opposite may also happen, i.e. /r/ becomes /l/ (e.g. sartén [salˈtẽ] 'frying pan'). As briefly mentioned above, aspirated and assimilated realizations ([ˈkahne]~[ˈkanːe] for carne) are also common. Neutralization of final /ɾ/ and /l/ never occurs before a vowel, even at word boundaries. el otro is always [el ˈotɾo]. These consonants may also be dropped in utterance-final position. Merging syllable-final /ɾ/ and /l/ is associated with rural and uncultured speech, but it has made some headway in urban speech. Because of this variation in final liquid consonants, transcriptions in this article follow the distribution found in Standard Peninsular Spanish.
- In Western Andalusian, an aspirated /r/ before /x/ can be elided due to the fact that /x/ itself is glottal. Thus, virgen /ˈbirxen/ ('virgin') varies between [ˈbirhẽ] and [ˈbihẽ], with the latter being degeminated from [hh].

== Morphology and syntax ==
=== Subject pronouns ===
Many Western Andalusian speakers replace the informal second person plural vosotros with the formal ustedes (without the formal connotation, as happens in other parts of Spain). For example, the standard second person plural verb forms for ir ('to go') are vosotros vais (informal) and ustedes van (formal), but in Western Andalusian one often hears ustedes vais for the informal version.

=== Object pronouns ===
Although mass media have generalised the use of le as a pronoun for animate, masculine direct objects, a phenomenon known as leísmo, many Andalusians still use the normative lo, as in lo quiero mucho (instead of le quiero mucho), which is also more conservative with regards to the Latin etymology of these pronouns. The Asturleonese dialects of northwestern Spain are similarly conservative, lacking leísmo, and the dominance of this more conservative direct object pronoun system in Andalusia may be due to the presence of Asturleonese settlers in the Reconquista. Subsequent dialect levelling in newly founded Andalusian towns would favor the more simple grammatical system, that is, the one without leísmo. Laísmo (the substitution of indirect pronoun le with la, as in the sentence la pegó una bofetada a ella) is similarly typical of central Spain and not present in Andalusia, and, though not prescriptively correct according to the RAE, is frequently heard on Radio and TV programmes.

=== Verbs ===
The standard form of the second-person plural imperative with a reflexive pronoun (os) is -aos, or -aros in informal speech, whereas in Andalusian, and other dialects, too, -se is used instead, so ¡callaos ya! / ¡callaros ya! ('shut up!') becomes ¡callarse ya! and ¡sentaos! / ¡sentaros! ('sit down!') becomes ¡sentarse!.

=== Gender ===
The gender of some words may not match that of Standard Spanish, e.g. la calor not el calor ('the heat'), el chinche not la chinche ('the bedbug'). La mar is also more frequently used than el mar. La mar de and tela de are lexicalised expressions to mean a lot of....

== Lexicon ==
Many words of Mozarabic, Berber, Romani, and Old Spanish origin occur in Andalusian which are not found in other dialects in Spain (but many of these may occur in South American and, especially, in Caribbean Spanish dialects due to the greater influence of Andalusian there). For example: chispenear instead of standard lloviznar or chispear ('to drizzle'), babucha instead of zapatilla ('slipper'), chavea instead of chaval ('kid') or antié for anteayer ('the day before yesterday').

A few words of Andalusi Arabic origin that have become archaisms or unknown in general Spanish can be found, together with multitude of sayings: e.g. haciendo morisquetas (from the word morisco, meaning pulling faces and gesticulating, historically associated with Muslim prayers). These can be found in older texts of Andalusi. There are some doublets of Arabic-Latinate synonyms with the Arabic form being more common in Andalusian like Andalusian alcoba for standard habitación or dormitorio ('bedroom') or alhaja for standard joya ('jewel').

== Influences ==
Some words pronounced in the Andalusian dialects have entered general Spanish with a specific meaning. One example is juerga, ("debauchery", or "partying"), the Andalusian pronunciation of huelga (originally "period without work", now "work strike"). The flamenco lexicon incorporates many Andalusisms, for example, cantaor, tocaor, and bailaor, which are examples of the dropped "d"; in standard spelling these would be cantador, tocador, and bailador, while the same terms in more general Spanish may be cantante, músico, and bailarín. Note that, when referring to the flamenco terms, the correct spelling drops the "d"; a flamenco cantaor is written this way, not cantador. In other cases, the dropped "d" may be used in standard Spanish for terms closely associated with Andalusian culture. For example, pescaíto frito ("little fried fish") is a popular dish in Andalusia, and this spelling is used in many parts of Spain when referring to this dish. For general usage, the spelling would be pescadito frito.

Llanito, the vernacular of the British overseas territory of Gibraltar, is based on Andalusian Spanish, with British English and other influences. Likewise, the Ceuta Arabic dialect, spoken in the autonomous city of Ceuta in Spain, is heavily influenced by Andalusian Spanish.

== Language movement ==
In Andalusia, there is a movement promoting the status of Andalusian as a separate language and not as a dialect of Spanish.

== See also ==
- Castúo
- Spanish dialects and varieties
- Standard Spanish
- The cant Caló is pronounced with Andalusian phonetics among Andalusian Romani
- Andalusi Arabic

== Bibliography ==
- Alvar, Manuel (1972). "A vueltas con el seseo y el ceceo" (PDF). Románica (in Spanish): 41–58.
- Brogan, Franny D. (2018). Sociophonetically-based phonology: An Optimality Theoretic account of /s/ lenition in Salvadoran Spanish (PhD). University of California, Los Angeles.
- Browman, C. P.; Goldstein, L. (1995), "Gestural syllable position effects in American English" (PDF), in Bell-Berti, F.; Raphael, L.J. (eds.), Producing Speech: Contemporary Issues for K Harris, New York: AIP, pp. 19–33
- Dalbor, John B. (March 1980). "Observations on Present-Day Seseo and Ceceo in Southern Spain". Hispania. 63 (1). American Association of Teachers of Spanish and Portuguese: 5–19. doi:10.2307/340806. JSTOR 340806.
- Fougeron, C (1999), "Prosodically Conditioned Articulatory Variation: A Review", U.C.L.A Working Papers in Phonetics, vol. 97, pp. 1–73
- Herrero de Haro, Alfredo; Hajek, John (2020), "Eastern Andalusian Spanish", Journal of the International Phonetic Association, 52: 135–156, doi:10.1017/S0025100320000146, S2CID 229484009
- Hualde, José Ignacio; Sanders, Benjamin P. (25 June 1995). "A New Hypothesis on the Origin of the Eastern Andalusian Vowel System". Annual Meeting of the Berkeley Linguistics Society. 21 (1): 426. doi:10.3765/bls.v21i1.1386.
- Lloret, Maria-Rosa (2007), "On the Nature of Vowel Harmony: Spreading with a Purpose", in Bisetto, Antonietta; Barbieri, Francesco (eds.), Proceedings of the XXXIII Incontro di Grammatica Generativa, pp. 15–35
- Martínez-Celdrán, Eugenio; Fernández-Planas, Ana Ma.; Carrera-Sabaté, Josefina (2003), "Castilian Spanish", Journal of the International Phonetic Association, 33 (2): 255–259, doi:10.1017/S0025100303001373
- Navarro Tomás, Tomás; Espinosa, Aurelio Macedonio Jr.; Rodríguez-Castellano, L. (1933). "La frontera del andaluz" (PDF). Revista de Filología Española (in Spanish). XX (3): 225–277.
- Penny, Ralph J. (2000). Variation and change in Spanish. Cambridge: Cambridge University Press. ISBN 978-0-521-78045-2.
- Recasens, Daniel (2004), "The Effect of Syllable Position on Consonant Reduction (Evidence from Catalan Consonant Clusters)" (PDF), Journal of Phonetics, 32 (3): 435–453, doi:10.1016/j.wocn.2004.02.001
