= Object pronoun =

Personal pronoun that is used typically as a grammatical object

In linguistics, an object pronoun is a personal pronoun that is used typically as a grammatical object: the direct or indirect object of a verb, or the object of a preposition. Object pronouns contrast with subject pronouns. Object pronouns in English take the objective case, sometimes called the oblique case or object case. For example, the English object pronoun me is found in "They see me" (direct object), "He's giving me my book" (indirect object), and "Sit with me" (object of a preposition); this contrasts with the subject pronoun in "I see them," "I am getting my book," and "I am sitting here."

== English ==
The English personal and interrogative pronouns have the following subject and object forms:

Singular subject pronoun	Singular object pronoun
I	me
you
he	him
she	her
it

Plural subject pronoun	Plural object pronoun
we	us
you
they	them

Interrogative subject pronoun	Interrogative object pronoun
who	whom
what

== Archaic second person forms ==
Historically, Middle English and Early Modern English retained the T–V distinction; the second person pronoun had separate singular/familiar and plural/formal forms with subject and object forms of both. In standard modern forms of English, all second person forms have been reduced to simply "you". These forms are still retained (sometimes partially) in some dialects of Northern English, Scottish English, and in the Scots language, a Germanic language closely related to English which diverged from it during the Early Modern period.

Singular/familiar subject pronoun	Singular/familiar object pronoun
thou	thee

Plural/formal subject pronoun	Plural/formal object pronoun
ye	you

== Other languages ==
In some languages the direct object pronoun and the indirect object pronoun have separate forms. For example, in the Spanish object pronoun system, direct object: Lo mandaron a la escuela (They sent him to school) and indirect object: Le mandaron una carta (They sent him a letter). Other languages divide object pronouns into a larger variety of classes. On the other hand, many languages, for example Persian, do not have distinct object pronouns: Man Farsi balad-am (I can speak Persian). Man ra mishenasad. (He knows me).

== History ==
Object pronouns, in languages where they are distinguished from subject pronouns, are typically a vestige of an older case system. English, for example, once had an extensive declension system that specified distinct accusative and dative case forms for both nouns and pronouns. And after a preposition, a noun or pronoun could be in either of these cases, or in the genitive or instrumental cases. With the exception of the genitive (the "apostrophe-s" form), in nouns this system disappeared entirely, while in personal pronouns it collapsed into a single case, covering the roles of both accusative and dative, as well as all instances after a preposition. That is, the new oblique (object) case came to be used for the object of either a verb or a preposition, contrasting with the genitive, which links two nouns.

For a discussion of the use of historically object pronouns in subject position in English (e.g. "Jay and me will arrive later"), see the article on English personal pronouns.

== See also ==
- Object (grammar)
- Subject (grammar)
