= Object pronouns in Spanish =

Category of pronouns in Spanish grammar

In Spanish, object pronouns are personal pronouns that take the function of the object in the sentence. Object pronouns may be both clitic and non-clitic, with non-clitic forms carrying greater emphasis. When used as clitics, object pronouns are generally proclitic, meaning they appear before the verb of which they are the object; enclitic pronouns (pronouns attached to the end of the verb) appear with positive imperatives, infinitives, and gerunds. Non-clitic forms, by contrast, can appear anywhere in the sentence but can only rarely be used without their clitic counterparts. When used together, clitic pronouns cluster in specific orders based primarily on person; clitic doubling is often found as well. In many dialects in Central Spain, including that of Madrid, speakers exhibit leísmo, using the indirect object pronoun le as the direct object pronoun where most other dialects would use lo (masculine) or la (feminine).

== History ==
As the history of the Spanish language saw the shedding of Latin declensions, only the subject and prepositional object survived as independent personal pronouns in Spanish: the rest became clitics. These clitics may be proclitic or enclitic, or doubled for emphasis. In modern Spanish, the placement of clitic pronouns is determined morphologically by the form of the verb. Clitics precede most conjugated verbs but come after infinitives, gerunds, and positive imperatives. For example: me vio but verme, viéndome, ¡véame! Exceptions exist for certain idiomatic expressions, like "once upon a time" (Érase una vez).

Person	Latin	Spanish
1st sg.	EGŌ (nominative); MIHI (dative); MĒ (accusative); MĒCUM (ablative MĒ + CUM "with")	yo (nominative) mí (prepositional) me (unstressed/clitic) conmigo (comitative)
1st pl.	NŌS (nominative/accusative); NŌBĪS (dative/ablative); NŌBĪSCUM (ablative NŌBĪS + CUM "with")	nosotros, nosotras (nominative/prepositional) nos (accusative/dative) connosco (comitative, archaic)
2nd sg.	TŪ (nominative); TIBI (dative); TĒ (accusative); TĒCUM (ablative TĒ + CUM "with")	tú (nominative) ti (prepositional) te (accusative/dative) contigo (comitative)
2nd pl.	VŌS (nominative/accusative); VŌBĪS (dative/ablative); VŌBĪSCUM (ablative VŌBĪS + CUM "with")	vosotros, vosotras (nominative/prepositional) os (accusative/dative) convusco (comitative, archaic)
3rd sg.	ILLE, ILLA, ILLUD (nominative); ILLĪ (dative); ILLUM, ILLAM, ILLUD (accusative)	él, ella, ello (nominative/prepositional) le (dative), se (dative, alongside an accusative pronoun) (Note: Se in this case continues Old Spanish ge – cognate to Portuguese lhe and Italian gli.) lo, la (accusative)
3rd pl.	ILLĪ, ILLAE (nominative); ILLĪS (dative); ILLŌS, ILLĀS (accusative)	ellos, ellas (nominative/prepositional) les (dative) los, las (accusative)
3rd refl. (sg. & pl.)	SIBI (dative); SĒ/SĒSĒ (accusative); SĒCUM (ablative SĒ + CUM "with")	sí (prepositional) se (accusative/dative) consigo (comitative)

=== Old Spanish ===
Unstressed pronouns in Old Spanish were governed by rules different from those in modern Spanish. The old rules were more determined by syntax than by morphology: the pronoun followed the verb, except when the verb was preceded (in the same clause) by a stressed word, such as a noun, adverb, or stressed pronoun.

For example, from Cantar de Mio Cid:

- e tornós pora su casa, ascóndense de mio Cid
- non lo desafié, aquel que gela diesse

If the first stressed word of a clause was in the future or conditional tense, or if it was a compound verb made up of haber + a participle, then any unstressed pronoun was placed between the two elements of the compound verb (this process still applies in European Portuguese where it is called mesoclisis).

- daregelo he (modern: se lo daré) = "I'll give it to him".
- daregelo ia/ie (modern: se lo daría) = "I would give it."
- dado gelo ha (modern: se lo ha dado) = "He has given it."

Before the 15th century, clitics never appeared in the initial position; not even after a coordinating conjunction or a caesura. They could, however, precede a conjugated verb if there was a negative or adverbial marker. For example:

- Fuese el conde = "The count left", but
- El conde se fue = "The count left"
- No se fue el conde = "The count did not leave"
- Entonces se fue el conde = "Then the count left".

The same rule applied to gerunds, infinitives, and imperatives. The forms of the future and the conditional functioned like any other verb conjugated with respect to the clitics. But a clitic following a future or conditional was usually placed between the infinitive root and the inflection. For example:

- Verme ha mañana = "See me tomorrow", but
- No me verá mañana = "He will not see me tomorrow"
- Mañana me verá = "He will see me tomorrow"

=== Early Modern Spanish ===
By the 15th century, Early Modern Spanish had developed "proclisis", in which an object's agreement markers come before the verb. According to Andrés Enrique-Arias, this shift helped speed up language processing of complex morphological material in the verb's inflection (including time, manner, and aspect).

This proclisis (ascenso de clítico) was a syntactic movement away from the idea that an object must follow the verb. For example, in these two sentences with the same meaning:

1. María quiere comprarlo = "Maria wants to buy it."
2. María lo quiere comprar = "Maria wants to buy it."

"Lo" is the object of "comprar" in the first example, but Spanish allows that clitic to appear in a preverbal position of a syntagma that it dominates strictly, as in the second example. This movement only happens in conjugated verbs. But a special case occurs for the imperative, where we see the postverbal position of the clitic

- Llámame = "Call me"
- dímelo = "Tell it to me"/"Tell me it"

This is accounted for by a second syntactic movement wherein the verb "passes by" the clitic that has already "ascended".

== Usage ==
Spanish object pronouns come in two forms: clitic and non-clitic, or stressed. Clitics, by definition, cannot function independently, and they therefore must appear attached to a host (a verb or preposition). With verbs, clitics may appear as proclitics before the verb or as enclitics attached to the end of the verb, with proclitization being significantly more common. When used together, clitic pronouns cluster in specific orders, and the process of enclitization is subject to certain rules in which sounds are dropped. Non-clitic pronouns, by contrast, are the stressed form of object pronouns; they are formed with the preposition a ("to") and the prepositional case of the pronoun. In contrast to clitic pronouns, non-clitic pronouns can appear anywhere in the sentence, but with very few exceptions, they cannot be used without their clitic counterparts (a process known as clitic doubling).

When used as clitics, object pronouns are generally proclitic, i.e. they appear before the verb of which they are the object. Thus:

- Yo te veo = "I see you" (lit. "I you see")
- Él lo dijo = "He said it" (lit. "He it said")
- Tú lo has hecho = "You have done it" (lit. "You it have done")
- El libro nos fue dado = "The book was given to us" (lit. "The book us was given")

In certain environments, however, enclitic pronouns (i.e. pronouns attached to the end of the verb or a word derived from a verb) may appear. Enclitization is generally only found with:

- positive imperatives
- infinitives
- gerunds

With positive imperatives, enclitization is always mandatory:

- Hazlo ("Do it") but never Lo haz
- Dáselo a alguien diferente ("Give it to somebody else") but never Se lo da a alguien diferente (as a command; that sentence can also mean "He/she/it gives it to somebody else", in which sense it is entirely correct)

With negative imperatives, however, proclitization is mandatory:

- No lo hagas ("Don't do it") but never No hágaslo
- No se lo des a alguien diferente ("Don't give it to somebody else") but never No déselo a alguien diferente

With infinitives and gerunds, enclitization is often, but not always, mandatory. With bare infinitives, enclitization is mandatory:

- tenerlo = "to have it"
- debértelo = "to owe it to you"
- oírnos = "to hear us"

In compound infinitives that make use of the past participle (i.e. all perfect and passive infinitives), enclitics attach to the uninflected auxiliary verb and not the past participle itself:

- haberlo visto = "to have seen it"
- serme guardado = "to be saved for me"
- habértelos dado = "to have given them to you"
- haberle sido mostrado = "to have been shown to him/her/you"

In compound infinitives that make use of the gerund, however, enclitics may attach to either the gerund itself or the main verb, including the rare cases when the gerund is used together with the past participle in a single infinitive:

- estar diciéndolo or estarlo diciendo = "to be saying it"
- andar buscándolos or andarlos buscando = "to go around looking for them"
- haber estado haciéndolo or haberlo estado haciendo = "to have been doing it"

With bare gerunds, enclitization is once again mandatory. In compound gerunds, enclitics attach to the same word as they would in the infinitive, and one has the same options with combinations of gerunds as with gerunds used in infinitives:

- haciéndolo = "doing it"
- hablándoles = "talking to them"
- habiéndolo visto = "having seen it"
- siéndome dado = "being given to me"
- habiéndole sido mostrado = "having been shown to him/her/you"
- habiendo estado teniéndolos or habiéndolos estado teniendo = "having been holding them"
- andando buscándolos or andándolos buscando = "going around looking for them"

In constructions that make use of infinitives or gerunds as arguments of a conjugated verb, clitic pronouns may appear as proclitics before the verb (as in most verbal constructions) or simply as enclitics attached to the infinitive or gerund itself. Similarly, in combinations of infinitives, enclitics may attach to any one infinitive:

- Quería hacerlo or Lo quería hacer = "He wanted to do it"
- Estoy considerándolo or Lo estoy considerando = "I'm considering it"
- Empieza a hacerlo or Empiézalo a hacer = "Start doing it"
- Sigue diciéndolo or Síguelo diciendo = "Keep saying it"
- querer vernos or querernos ver = "to want to see us"
- tener que poder hacerlo, tener que poderlo hacer, or tenerlo que poder hacer = "to have to be able to do it"

Enclitics may be found in other environments in literary and archaic language, but such constructions are virtually absent from everyday speech.

Enclitization is subject to the following rules:

- The s in the first-person plural ending -mos drops before nos, se, and os: vámonos ("let's go"), démoselo ("let's give it to him"), mostrémoos ("let's show you [pl.]"), etc.
- The d in the informal second-person plural positive imperative drops before os: sentaos ("[you all] sit down"), apuraos ("[you all] hurry up"), suscribíos (Note: With reflexive verbs ending in -ir, an accent must be added to the i in order to break the diphthong, thus suscribíos ([suskɾiˈβios]) and not suscribios ([susˈkɾiβjos]).) ("[you all] subscribe"), etc., except for the verb ir: idos ("[you all] leave")

Non-clitic, or stressed pronouns, on the other hand, do not require a host, and they can thus be placed anywhere in the sentence. With very few exceptions, however, they must be used along with their clitic equivalents:

- A mí me gusta toda gente = "I like all people"
- Su amigo te vio a ti mucho en esos días = "His friend saw you a lot in those days"
- Le dará mucho tiempo a él = "She'll give him a lot of time"
- Se lo habrían dado a ellos los muchachos = "The boys would have given it to them"

Non-clitic accusative pronouns cannot have impersonal antecedents; impersonal accusative clitics must therefore be used with their antecedents instead:

- Se las di las cosas but never Se las di ellas = "I gave the things (them) to her"
- Lo vi el libro but never Lo vi él = "I saw the book (it)"

Impersonal dative clitic pronouns, however, may be stressed as such:

- Se lo hiciste a ellos = "You did it to them"
- Esto le cabe a ella = "This fits that (it)"

In a similar vein, impersonal accusative clitics are occasionally used to provide a degree of emphasis to the sentence as a whole:

- Lo sé lo que dijo = "I know what he/she/you said" (with a degree of emphasis)
- ¡Lo hace el trabajo! ¡Déjalo solo! = "He's doing his work! Leave him alone!"

=== Combinations of clitic pronouns ===
In Spanish, up to two (and rarely three) clitic pronouns can be used with a single verb, generally one accusative and one dative. Whether proclitic or enclitic, they cluster in the following order:

1	2	3	4
se	te os	me nos	lo, la, los, las, le, les

Thus:

- Él me lo dio = "He gave it to me"
- Ellos te lo dijeron = "They said it to you"
- Yo te me daré = "I will give myself to you"
- Vosotros os nos presentasteis = "You [pl.] introduced yourselves to us"
- Se le perdieron los libros = "The books disappeared on him" (lit. "The books got lost to him")

When an accusative third-person non-reflexive pronoun (lo, la, los, or las) is used with a dative pronoun that is understood to also be third-person non-reflexive (le or les), the dative pronoun is replaced by se:

- Se lo di = "I gave it to him"
- Él se lo dijo = "He said it to him"

If se is being used as a reflexive indirect object, however, it is often, though not always, disambiguated with a sí:

- Se lo hizo a sí or Se lo hizo = "He did it to himself"
- Se lo mantenían a sí or Se lo mantenían = "They kept it for themselves"

Only one accusative clitic can be used with a single verb, and the same is true for any one type of dative clitic. When more than one accusative clitic or dative clitic of a specific type is used, therefore, the verb or preposition must be repeated for each clitic used:

- Te gusta y me gusta but never *Te y me gusta = "You and I like him" (lit. "He pleases you and me") – can also be phrased with a single plural clitic as A ti y a mí nos gusta (i.e. "You and I, we like him").
- Lo vi y te vi but never *Lo y te vi = "I saw him and you"

Occasionally, however, with verbs such as dejar ("to let"), which generally takes a direct object as well as a subsequent verb as a further grammatical argument, objects of two different verbs will appear together and thus may appear to be objects of the same verb:

- Me la dejaron ver = "They let me see her" (la is the object of ver; Me dejaron verla is also acceptable)
- Te lo dejará hacer = "He/she will let you do it" (Te dejará hacerlo is also acceptable)

Like Latin, Spanish makes use of double dative constructions, and thus up to two dative clitics can be used with a single verb. One must be the dative of benefit (or "ethical" dative, i.e. someone (or something) who is indirectly affected by the action), and the other must refer to the direct recipient of the action itself. Context is generally sufficient to determine which is which:

- Me le arreglaron la moto = roughly "They fixed the bike [motorcycle] for him on my behalf" or "They fixed the bike for me on his behalf" (literally more like "They fixed the bike for him for me" or vice versa)
- Muerte, ¿por qué te me lo llevaste tan pronto? = "Death, why did you take him from me so soon?" (the reflexive llevarse, lit. "to carry to oneself", is used idiomatically to mean "to take")

== Clitic doubling ==
Clitic doubling is a common occurrence in Spanish and, in addition to providing emphasis, often occurs for purely grammatical reasons, most often with dative clitics but sometimes with accusative clitics as well. All non-clitic indirect objects as well as the majority of personal non-clitic direct objects must be preceded by the preposition a, and an appropriate dative clitic pronoun is thus often used to distinguish between the two. With indirect objects that come before the verb, clitic doubling is mandatory in the active voice:

- Al hombre le dimos un regalo but never Al hombre dimos un regalo = "We gave the man a gift"
- Al perro le dijo que se sentara but never Al perro dijo que se sentara = "He/She/You told the dog to sit"

With indirect objects that come after the verb, however, clitic doubling is usually optional, though generally preferred in spoken language:

- Siempre (les) ofrezco café a mis huéspedes = "I always offer coffee to my guests"
- (Le) Dijeron a José que se quedara donde estaba = "They told Jose to stay where he was"
- (Le) Diste al gato alguna comida = "You gave the cat some food"

Nevertheless, with the ethical dative as well as the dative of inalienable possession, clitic doubling is most often mandatory:

- No le gusta a la mujer la idea but never No gusta a la mujer la idea = "The woman doesn't like the idea" (lit. "The idea doesn't please the woman")
- Le preparé a mi jefe un informe but never Preparé a mi jefe un informe = "I prepared a report for my boss"
- Les cortó a las chicas el pelo but never Cortó a las chicas el pelo = "He/She/You cut the girls' hair" (dative of inalienable possession, cannot be literally translated into English)

With indefinite pronouns, however, clitic doubling is optional even in these constructions:

- Esta película no (le) gusta a nadie = "No one likes this movie" (lit. "This movie pleases no one")
- (Les) Preparó esta comida a todos = "He/she/you made this food for everyone"

In the passive voice, where direct objects do not exist at all, non-emphatic clitic doubling is always optional, even with personal pronouns:

- (Le) Era guardado a mi amigo este pedazo = "This piece was saved for my friend"
- (Te) Fue dado a ti = "It was given to you"

Non-emphatic clitic doubling with accusative clitics is much rarer. It generally only occurs with:

- the pronoun todo ("all, everything")
- numerals that refer to animate nouns (usually people) and are preceded by the definite article (e.g. los seis – "the six")
- the indefinite pronoun uno when referring to the person speaking

Thus:

- No lo sé todo = "I don't know everything"
- Los vi a los cinco = "I saw the five (of them)"
- Si no les gusta a ellos, lo rechazarán a uno = "If they don't like it, they'll reject you"

Accusative clitic doubling is also used in object-verb-subject (OVS) word order to signal topicalization. The appropriate direct object pronoun is placed between the direct object and the verb, and thus in the sentence La carne la come el perro ("The dog eats the meat") there is no confusion about which is the subject of the sentence (el perro).

Clitic doubling is often necessary to modify clitic pronouns, whether accusative or dative. The non-clitic form of the accusative is usually identical to that of the dative, although non-clitic accusative pronouns cannot be used to refer to impersonal things such as animals and inanimate objects. With attributive adjectives, nouns used with apposition (such as "us friends"), and the intensifier mismo, clitic doubling is mandatory, and the non-clitic form of the pronoun is used:

- Te vi a ti muy feliz = "I saw a very happy you"
- Os conozco a vosotros gente (or, in Latin America, Los conozco a ustedes gente) = "I know you people"
- Le ayudaron a ella misma = "They helped her herself" (ayudar governs the dative)

With predicative adjectives, however, clitic doubling is not necessary. Clitic pronouns may be directly modified by such adjectives, which must be placed immediately after the verb:

- Mantente informado = "Keep yourself informed"
- Viéndolo hecho en persona, aprendí mucho = "By seeing it done in person, I learned a lot"
- Lo había oído dicho a veces = "He/she/you had heard it said occasionally"

== Prepositional and comitative cases ==
The prepositional case is used with the majority of prepositions: a mí, contra ti, bajo él, etc., although several prepositions, such as entre ("between, among") and según ("according to"), actually govern the nominative (or sí in the case of se): entre yo y mi hermano ("between me and my brother"), según tú ("according to you"), entre sí ("among themselves"), etc., with the exception of entre nos ("between us"), where the accusative may be used instead (entre nosotros is also acceptable). With the preposition con ("with"), however, the comitative is used instead. Yo, tú, and se have distinct forms in the comitative: conmigo, contigo, and consigo, respectively, in which the preposition becomes one word with its object and thus must not be repeated by itself: conmigo by itself means "with me", and con conmigo is redundant. For all other pronouns, the comitative is identical to the prepositional and is used in the same way: con él, con nosotros, con ellos, etc.

As with verbs, prepositions must be repeated for each pronoun they modify:

- Este vino es solamente para mí y para ti but never Este vino es solamente para mí y ti = "This wine is only for me and (for) you"
- Ella estaba con él y con ella but never Ella estaba con él y ella = "She was with him and (with) her"

== See also ==
- leísmo
- loísmo

== Bibliography ==
- Nueva Gramática de la Lengua Española, Espasa, 2009.
- Gramática descriptiva de la Lengua Española, Ignacio Bosque y Violeta Demonte, Espasa, 1999.
