= Castúo =

Spanish dialects spoken in Extremadura, Spain

Castúo is the generic name for the dialects of Spanish spoken in the autonomous community of Extremadura, in Spain. It is not to be confused with Extremaduran, a language between Asturleonese and Castilian, or with Fala, another language spoken in Extremadura that is most similar to Galician-Portuguese.

== Phonology ==
- Debuccalization (reduction to [h]) of [s] and [θ] in syllable-final position, as is common in Spanish varieties in the southern half of Spain.
- Frequent loss of d, in any position, as is common in Spanish varieties in the southern half of Spain.
- Simplification of the consonantic group -nf, to f
- Simplification of the consonantic group -rj, to j
- Simplification of the consonantic group rn, to nn
- Pronunciation of word-initial 'h' as a glottal fricative, [h], in many words in which Latin had an initial 'f', as is common in most Andalusian varieties.
- Occasional consonantic change l/r and r/l, which occurs in Andalusian Spanish as well
- General loss of r in final position

== Morphology ==
- Anteposition of article before possessive pronoun, as in Extremaduran
- Use of diminutives ino and ina, a product of contact with Leonese
- Use of masculine article er before a consonant

== Writers ==
- José María Gabriel y Galán
- Luis Chamizo Trigueros
- Miguel Herrero Uceda
- Elisa Herrero Uceda
