= Loísmo =

Spanish dialect feature

Loísmo, with its feminine counterpart laísmo, is a feature of certain dialects of Spanish consisting of the use of the pronouns lo, la, los, and las (which are normally used for direct objects) in place of the pronouns le and les (which are used for indirect objects). Loísmo and laísmo are almost entirely restricted to some dialects in central Spain; they are virtually absent from formal and written language. In practice laísmo is much more frequent than loísmo.

A simple example would be saying lo hablé (lit. "I spoke him"), la hablé (lit. "I spoke her"), los hablé (lit. "I spoke them [masculine]"), or las hablé (lit. "I spoke them [feminine]") where a speaker of a dialect without loísmo would say le(s) hablé ("I spoke to him/her/them").

This effectively means the loss of a declensional case marker. The difference between lo (accusative case) and le (dative case) are holdovers from Latin declension. The general trend in the evolution of Spanish has been to drop such declensions, but most dialects of Spanish have preserved this feature for object pronouns. It just happens that speakers with loísmo have further lost this distinction, replacing it with a different distinction of a semantic kind.

Another effect of loísmo and laísmo is that the gender of the indirect object is clearer than it would be using le. One issue with non-loísmo dialects is that the le pronoun is ambiguous, as it does not specify gender. For example, le doy un beso can mean "I give him a kiss", "I give her a kiss", or even "I give you (formal) a kiss". One way around this ambiguity is to clarify the pronoun with a prepositional phrase; for our example, this would mean le doy un beso a él, le doy un beso a ella, or le doy un beso a usted, respectively. Since lo indicates masculine and la indicates feminine, using loísmo and laísmo means that this clarification is not necessary.

Loísmo can also seemingly change the meaning of certain phrases, since some verbs take on a different meaning based on the case of their objects. For example, le pegué means "I struck him", but a speaker with loísmo would say lo pegué, which literally means "I pasted/stuck him (onto something)" in dialects without loísmo.

== Loísmo and the Real Academia Española ==
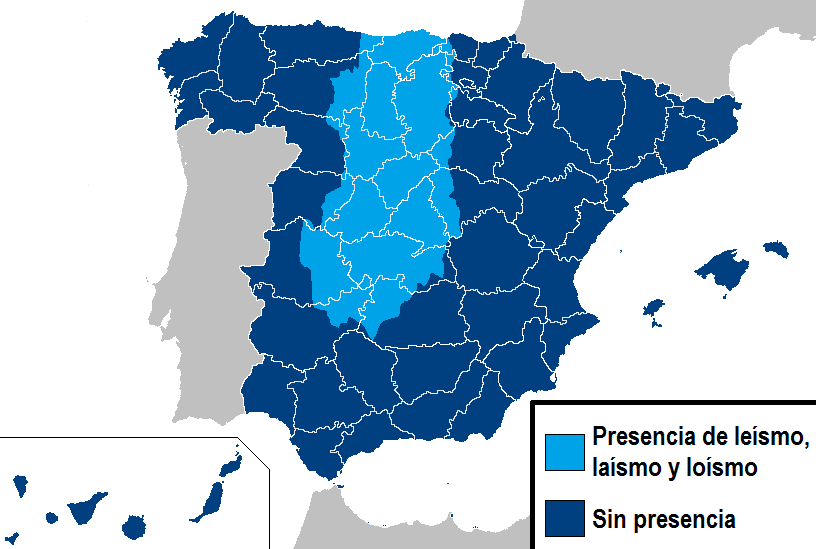
Area of leísmo and laísmo in central Spain

The Real Academia Española listed loísmo and laísmo as correct in 1771; however, it condemned their use in 1796. The Academy's online grammar guide currently states it is "inappropriate" to use them.

The lack of acceptance from the RAE has caused a certain classist or social stigma to be attached to loísmo and those who use it. This often leads to hypercorrection, with loístas choosing the le pronoun even for direct objects as a form of leísmo.

== See also ==
- Leísmo
- Spanish object pronouns
