= List of standalone war memorials to the enemy =

This sortable list covers standalone war memorials to the enemy (Note: The status of Soviet World War II memorials in the former Axis powers and their allies has been complex. Italy withdrew from the Axis after the 1943 Armistice of Cassibile. Likewise, in Romania, after the defeat at Stalingrad, the local politicians, mirroring public opinion, asked the government to withdraw from the Axis. This ultimately led to a coup in 1944 when Romania aligned itself with the Soviet Union. A similar 1944 coup in Bulgaria also aligned it with the Soviets. In Hungary, an armistice with the Soviets was reached in January 1945. The Soviet Union later cemented those gains in the Paris Peace Treaties of 1947. Because of that here Soviet memorials in those countries, except Germany, are not treated as enemy ones and are excluded.) combatants worldwide. The list excludes numerous war cemeteries, joint memorials to multiple belligerents and monuments to civil war combatants, such as American Confederate monuments. Some memorials were erected by contemporary enemies during conflicts, others by former enemies after conflicts or by host countries out of respect. The memorials highlighted in grey have since been demolished or are otherwise unaccounted for.

== List ==
Memorial	Enemy (at the time)	Conflict	Host combatant (at the time)	Location	Image
Atomic bomb plaque to the American prisoners of war	United States	Atomic bombing of Hiroshima in World War II	Japanese Empire	Hiroshima, Japan	
Battle of Flamborough Head Toposcope	United States	American Revolutionary War	British Empire	Flamborough Head, United Kingdom	
Bust of Ho Chi Minh	North Vietnam	First Indochina War	French Union	Montreuil, France	
Bust of Toussaint Louverture	Saint-Domingue	Haitian Revolution	French Empire	Bordeaux, France	
Crown Forces Monument	British Empire	American Revolutionary War	United States	Greensboro, North Carolina, United States	
Điện Biên Phủ Monument	French Union	First Indochina War	North Vietnam	Điện Biên Phủ, Vietnam	
Fallschirmjäger memorial	Nazi Germany	Battle of Crete in World War II	Kingdom of Greece	Crete, Greece	
Featherston Camp memorials and Sakura Garden	Japanese Empire	World War II	New Zealand	Featherston, New Zealand	
Fubo B-29 Air Crash Crew Monument	United States	Pacific theatre of World War II	Japanese Empire	Mount Fubo, Zaō Mountains, Japan	
German monuments on the Trail of Memory of the Chapelotte Pass	German Empire	World War I	France	Chapelotte Pass, France	
German war monument in Chaulnes	German Empire	World War I	France	Chaulnes, France	
German war monument in Flaucourt	German Empire	World War I	France	Flaucourt, France	
Guadalcanal Japanese Memorial	Japanese Empire	Guadalcanal campaign in World War II	British Solomon Islands	Hill 35, Guadalcanal, Solomon Islands	
India Peace Memorial	Japanese Empire	Battle of Imphal in World War II	British Raj	Tiddim Road, Manipur, India	
Indian National Army Monument	Azad Hind	Occupation of Singapore in World War II	British Empire	Singapore downtown	
Isao Yamazoe Shrine	Japanese Empire	Japanese occupation of the Philippines in World War II	Commonwealth of the Philippines	Dulag, Philippines	
James Stuart Monument	British Empire	American Revolutionary War	United States	Guilford Courthouse National Military Park, North Carolina, United States	
John André Monument	British Empire	American Revolutionary War	United States	Tappan, New York, United States	
John McCain capture monument	United States	Vietnam War	North Vietnam	Hanoi, Vietnam	
Kamikaze memorial at Mabalacat East Airfield	Japanese Empire	Japanese occupation of the Philippines in World War II	Commonwealth of the Philippines	Mabalacat, Philippines	
Kemal Atatürk Memorial	Ottoman Empire	Gallipoli campaign in World War I	Australia	Canberra, Australia	
Khalanga War Memorial	Kingdom of Nepal	Battle of Nalapani of the Anglo-Nepalese War	East India Company	Dehradun, India	
Long Tan Cross	Australia	Vietnam War	North Vietnam	Bà Rịa–Vũng Tàu province, Vietnam (replica)	
Memorial cross to Charles the Bold	Duchy of Burgundy	Battle of Nancy in the Burgundian Wars	Duchy of Lorraine	Nancy, France (replica)	
Memorial plaque to submarine I-124	Japanese Empire	Pacific theatre of World War II	Australia	Darwin, Australia	
Memorial stone to four Junkers Ju 88 airmen of Kampfgeschwader 54	Nazi Germany	World War II	United Kingdom	Test Valley, Hampshire, United Kingdom	
Memorial to the Allied prisoners of war in Fukuoka 2B Camp	Allies of World War II (mostly Netherlands, also United States, United Kingdom and Australia)	World War II	Japanese Empire	Nagasaki, Japan	
Memorial to Polish Soldiers and German Anti-Fascists	Poland, Polish Underground State	Invasion of Poland in World War II	Nazi Germany	Berlin, Germany	
Monument to the III SS Panzer Corps	Nazi Germany	German occupation of Estonia during World War II	Soviet Union	Sinimäe, Estonia	
Monument to François Marceau	France	War of the First Coalition	Holy Roman Empire	Höchstenbach, Germany	
Monument to José de San Martín	Argentina	Spanish American wars of independence	Spanish Empire	Madrid, Spain	
Monument to Józef Poniatowski	Duchy of Warsaw under French Empire	Battle of Leipzig in the Napoleonic Wars	Kingdom of Saxony	Leipzig, Germany	
Monument to the Battle of the Trebia	Carthage	Second Punic War	Roman Republic	Ponte di Tuna, Italy	
Monument to the crossing of the Rhine by the 3rd Algerian Tirailleurs Regiment	France	World War II	Nazi Germany	Speyer, Germany	
Monument to the crossing of the Rhine by the 21st Infantry Regiment	France	World War II	Nazi Germany	Leimersheim, Germany	
Monument to the fallen Egyptian soldiers	Egypt	1948 Arab–Israeli War	Israel	Ad Halom, Israel	
Monument to the fallen German soldiers	Nazi Germany	German occupation of Yugoslavia in World War II	Yugoslavia	Sarajevo, Bosnia and Herzegovina	
Monument to the Fallen of the Grande Armée	French Empire	French invasion of Russia in the Napoleonic Wars	Russian Empire	Borodino, Russia	
Monument to the Italian prisoners of war	Fascist Italy	World War II	Australia	Cowra, Australia	
Monument to the Liberation of Pskov from Bolshevism by German Troops (Note: The monument was a modified version of the previous Soviet Monument to the Fighters for the Proletarian Revolution.)	Nazi Germany	Eastern Front of World War II	Soviet Union	Pskov, Russia	
Monument to French soldiers fallen in the Battle of Berezina	French Empire	French invasion of Russia in the Napoleonic Wars	Russian Empire	Bryli village, Minsk region, Belarus	
Monument to Russian soldiers fallen in the Battle of Reims	Russian Empire	Campaign of 1814 in the Napoleonic Wars	French Empire	Reims, France	
Monument to Russian soldiers fallen in the Campaign of 1814	Russian Empire	Campaign of 1814 in the Napoleonic Wars	French Empire	Bergères-lès-Vertus, France	
Monument to Simón Bolívar	Venezuela	Venezuelan War of Independence	Spanish Empire	Madrid, Spain	
Monument to the Soviet 5th Guards Army	Soviet Union	Eastern Front of World War II	Nazi Germany	Dresden, Germany	
Monument to Swedes from Russians	Swedish Empire	Swedish invasion of Russia	Russian Empire	Poltava, Ukraine	
Naoetsu Peace Memorial Park	Australia	Pacific theatre of World War II	Japanese Empire	Jōetsu, Niigata, Japan	
Obelisk to Russian soldiers fallen in the Battle of Fère-Champenoise	Russian Empire	Campaign of 1814 in the Napoleonic Wars	French Empire	Fère-Champenoise, France	
Omi Prisoners of War Memorial	United Kingdom	Pacific theatre of World War II	Japanese Empire	Omi, Niigata Prefecture, Japan	
Patrick Ferguson Memorial	British Empire	American Revolutionary War	United States	Blacksburg, South Carolina, United States	
Robert Hampton Gray Memorial	Canada	Pacific theatre of World War II	Japanese Empire	Onagawa, Japan	
Shrine of Philippus of Croton	Sparta	Greek campaign against Segesta	Segesta	Segesta, Italy	
Spiking the Gun monument to John Paul Jones	United States	American Revolutionary War	British Empire	Whitehaven, United Kingdom	
Statue of George Washington	United States	American Revolutionary War	British Empire	London, United Kingdom	
Statue of Lars Porsena	Etruscan civilization	Roman–Etruscan Wars	Ancient Rome	Rome, Italy	
Triumphal Arch in Parlington	United States	American Revolutionary War	British Empire	Parlington, United Kingdom	
Wounded Eagle Monument	French Empire	Waterloo campaign in the Napoleonic Wars	Kingdom of the Netherlands	Waterloo, Belgium	
