= Fallschirmjäger memorial =

German WWII war memorial in Crete

Coordinates: 35°30′22.07″N 23°59′36.32″E

Wreath deposits at the memorial during the Axis occupation

The Fallschirmjäger memorial (German: Fallschirmjäger-Denkmal) is a German war memorial for German parachutists who fell during the ten-day Battle of Crete in World War II. The memorial, known to Cretans as the German bird (Greek: Γερμανικό πουλί, Germaniko pouli) or the Evil bird (Greek: Κακό πουλί, Kako pouli), was erected in 1941 by the occupation forces and is located about three kilometers west of Chania on the road to Agii Apostoli.

== Original memorial ==
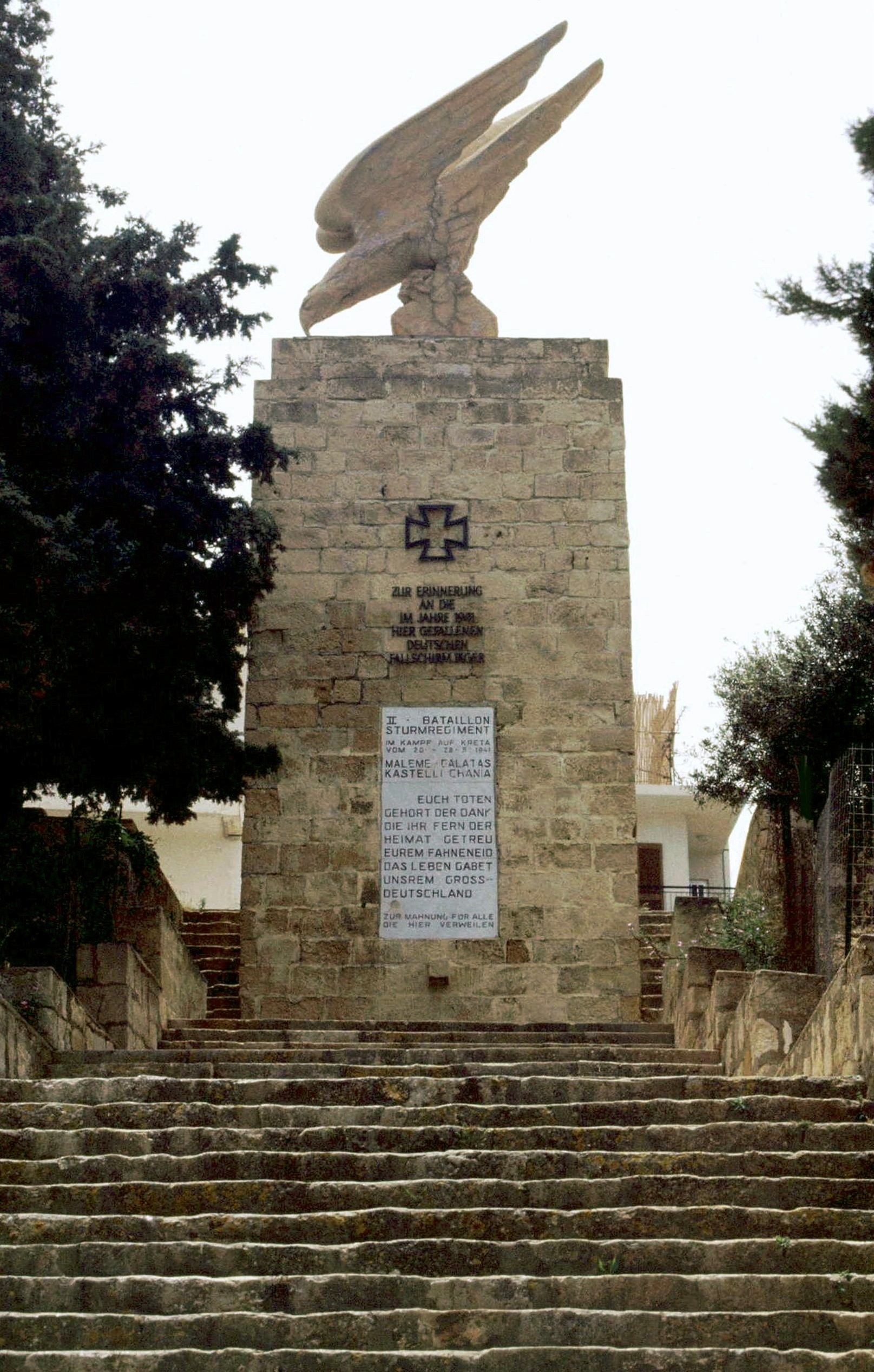
The memorial in 1973

The invasion of Crete in May 1941 was the first major airborne assault in history. Despite their victory, the elite German paratroopers suffered such heavy losses that Adolf Hitler forbade further airborne operations of such large scale for the rest of the war. The memorial was erected at the end of a stone staircase leading to the top of a small hill. It consisted of a tall pedestal built from stone blocks, atop which stood a concrete diving eagle gripping a swastika in its talons.

== Present state ==
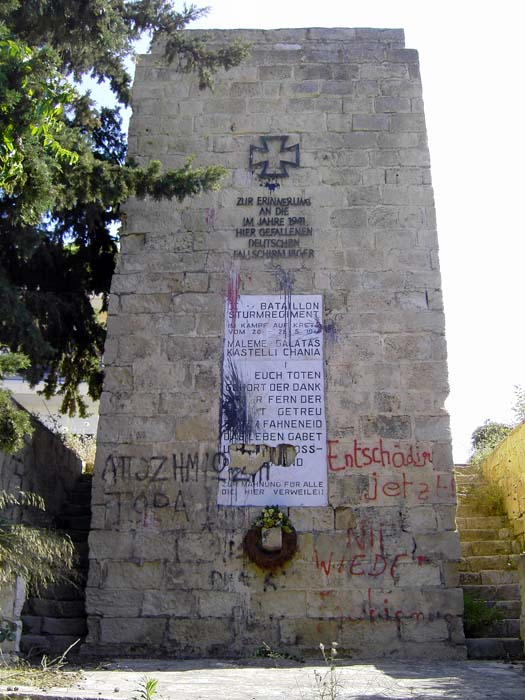
The memorial's pedestal as it is today.

Originally in the countryside, Germaniko pouli is today encompassed by dense urban buildings and has lent its name to the surrounding area. Apart from the swastika which was covered with cement soon after the liberation of Crete, the memorial stood more or less intact until the early 2000s. In the winter of 2001, a storm demolished most of the eagle's body. Today, the pedestal and its inscription are in a derelict state and mostly covered with graffiti. There were some discussions and controversy whether it should be restored or demolished.

== See also ==
- Fallschirmjäger (World War II)
- Brothers von Blücher
- Cretan Resistance
- Kidnap of General Kreipe
- List of standalone war memorials to the enemy

== Bibliography ==
- Anna Maria Droumpouki, Μνημεία της λήθης. Ίχνη του Β΄ Παγκοσμίου Πολέμου στην Ελλάδα και στην Ευρώπη, prologue: Hagen Fleischer, Athens: Polis Editions, 2014, pp. 215-222. (in Greek)
