= Bello orthography =

Spanish-language writing conventions

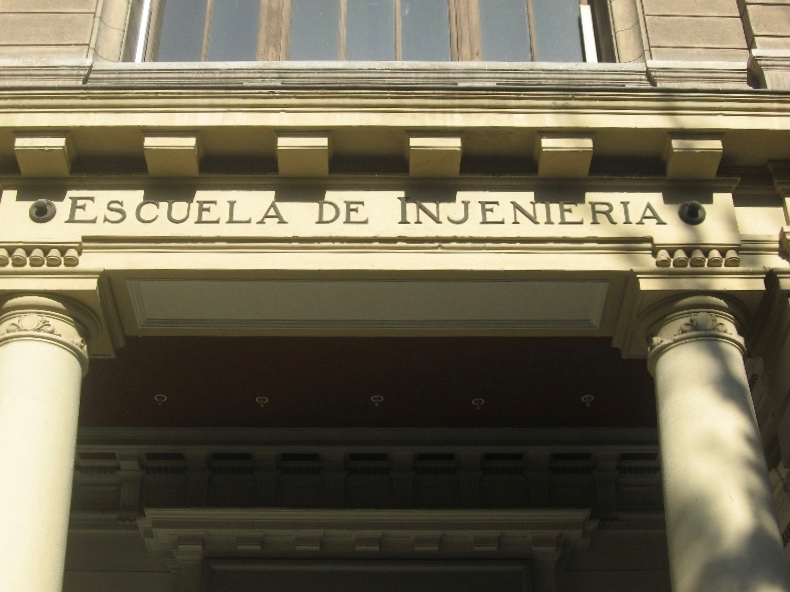
Bello orthography in University of Chile's School of Engineering entrance. This reads ESCUELA DE INJENIERIA; current standard spelling would be ESCUELA DE INGENIERIA.

The Bello orthography or Chilean orthography (Spanish: Ortografía de Bello) was a Spanish-language orthography created by the Venezuelan linguist Andrés Bello and the Colombian Juan García del Río.

It was originally published in London, in the article Indicaciones sobre la conveniencia de simplificar y uniformar la ortografía en América ("Indications on the Convenience of Simplifying and Standardizing Orthography in America"), in the journals Biblioteca Americana in 1823 and El Repertorio Americano in 1826; its aim was to modify the orthography of American Spanish in order to achieve perfect correspondence between graphemes and phonemes.

Partially, this orthographic reform began to be used officially in Chile in 1844, and its use later spread to Argentina, Colombia, Ecuador, Nicaragua, and Venezuela. The last country to maintain it was Chile, where the norms of the Royal Spanish Academy (RAE) were adopted in 1927.

== Background ==
The humanist Antonio de Nebrija proposed in the first book of his Gramática castellana (1492) that “we should write as we pronounce, and pronounce as we write, because otherwise letters would have been invented in vain” (tenemos de escribir como pronunciamos, y pronunciar como escribimos, porque en otra manera en vano fueron halladas las letras,) and he introduced the concept of Spanish phonetic orthography, which he reiterated in the text Reglas de orthographia de la lengua castellana (1517).

In the first half of the 17th century, Gonzalo Correas promoted an orthographic reform based on phonetic rather than etymological criteria, under the principle that each phoneme should correspond biuniquely to a single grapheme. He set out this idea in his works Nueva i zierta ortografia kastellana (1624) and Ortografia kastellana nueva i perfeta (1630), where he stated: “let us write purely and cleanly, as it is pronounced, according to the said rule, that one must write as one pronounces, and pronounce as one writes” (eskrivamos pura i linpiamente, komo se pronunzia, konforme á la di[c]ha rregla, ke se á de eskrivir, komo se pronunzia, i pronunziar, komo se eskrive (original orthography)).

Although the Royal Spanish Academy (1713) simplified Spanish spelling in pursuit of a phonetic standard beginning with the publication of its Orthographía española (1741), the tendency to reform writing came to a halt in 1815. Moreover, at that time the Academy did not include Hispano-Americans among its members nor did it take into account the processes the language was undergoing through contact with the linguistic diversity of the conquered lands; thus, American scholars of the language had to carry out their work outside the Academy and, at times, in open opposition to it.

== Orthographic reform ==
=== Bello's proposal ===
In London in 1823, in the first issue of the journal Biblioteca Americana, Andrés Bello and Juan García del Río published the article “Indications on the Convenience of Simplifying and Standardizing Orthography in America” (Indicaciones sobre la conveniencia de simplificar y uniformar la ortografía en América). Although acknowledging the work of the Royal Spanish Academy in organizing and simplifying the spelling of the language, Bello considered that the etymological constraints the Academy had imposed on itself had produced disastrous effects on education on both sides of the Atlantic, and he came out “in favor of the phonetic criterion and against the etymological one” (en favor del criterio fonético y [en contra d]el etimológico).

Bello’s thesis was based on the idea that the use of etymology as a linguistic criterion was pointless—reading and, in general, the use of a language are in no way linked to knowledge of its historical development—and, in view of the problems it caused, contrary to rational use.

As a result, Bello proposed eliminating the ambiguous letter c and the silent h, assigning g and y only one of their values, always writing rr to represent the trilled consonant, and devoting a body of scholars to resolving in practice the difference between b and v (betacism). (Note: The confusion between ll and y, yeísmo, was not considered.) His goal was to create a one-to-one correspondence between phonemes and graphemes and to simplify the nineteenth-century orthography of American Spanish, which was characterized by certain inconsistencies:

Letters that graphically represent identical phonemes:

- The sound /k/, represented by c, k, qu.
- The sound /s/, represented by s, c (+ e/i), z (seseo).
- The sound /x/, represented by g (+ e/i), j, x.
- The sound /i/, represented by i, y.

Letters that represent more than one phoneme:

- c, g, r, x, y.

Silent letters:

- h.
- u —in the combinations gue/gui, que/qui—.

In addition to a redistribution of the syllabary in accordance with the reality of linguistic usage, Bello advocated a simplification implemented in two stages: (Note: According to Ángel Rosenblat, quoted by José Antonio Carbonell (1981))

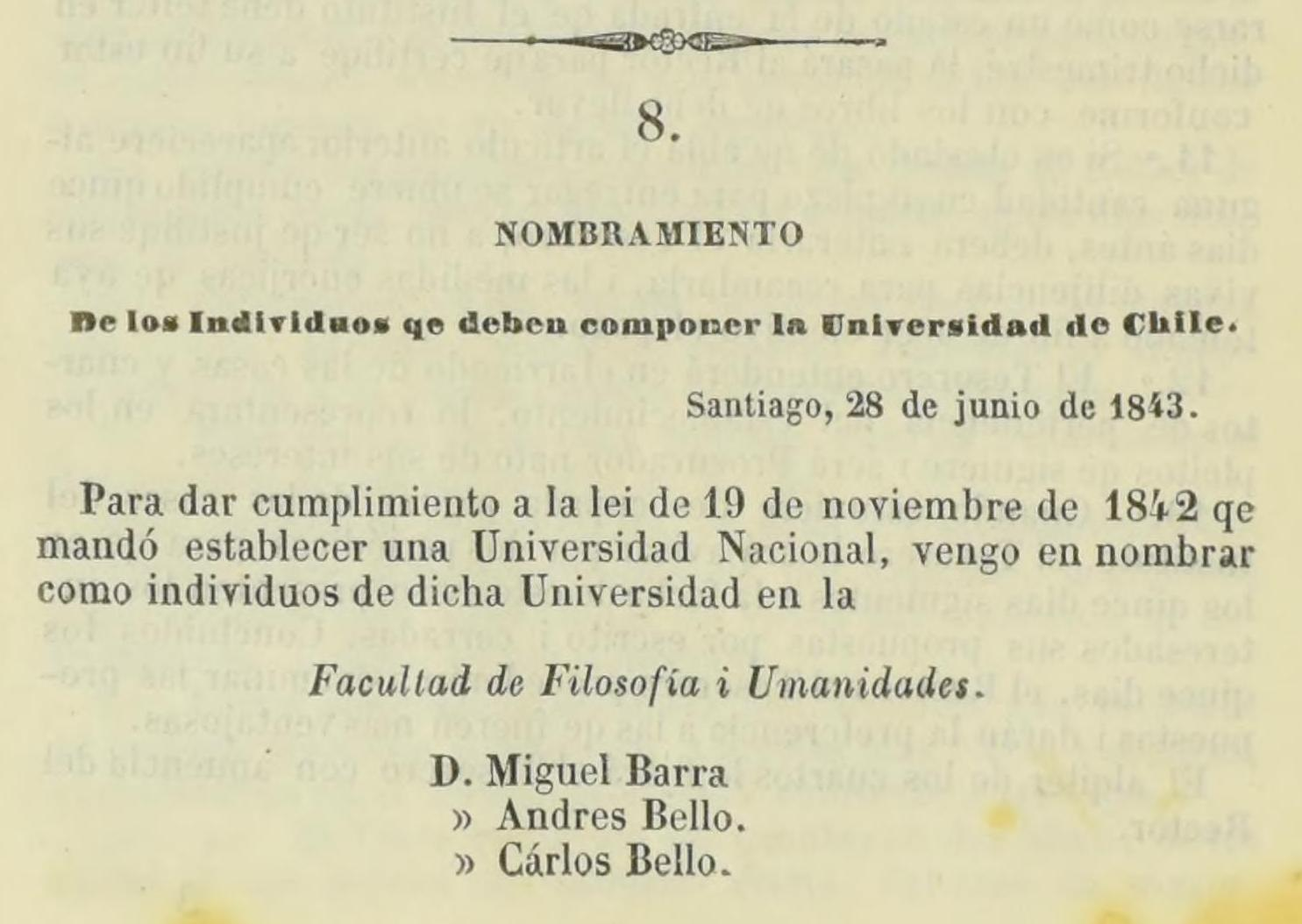
Excerpt from the Anales de la Universidad de Chile (1843), written in Bello's orthography

First stage:

- Replace y with i when it has a vocalic value (rei, i).
- Replace the voiceless fricative sound of g with j (jeneral, jinebra) and also replace x with j (Méjico, Jiménez).
- Replace the sibilant sound of c with z (zerdo, zisma).
- Eliminate the silent h (ombre, ueso).
- Eliminate the silent u in que and qui (qeso, qienes).
- Write rr whenever the multiple trill, also known as the “strong sound,” is pronounced (rrazón, alrrededor).

Second stage:

- Replace c with q for the plosive sound (qasa, qomo).
- Eliminate the silent u in gue and gui (gerra, ginda).

=== Sarmiento’s proposal ===
Twenty years later, during his second exile in Chile (1840–1851), Domingo Faustino Sarmiento put forward a proposal similar to Bello’s. On October 17, 1843, while Bello was serving as rector of the University of Chile, Sarmiento presented to the Faculty of Humanities his project Memoria (sobre ortografía americana), in which he preferred to retain the letter “c” and dispense with “z”, as well as to eliminate “v” and “x.” However, on February 19, 1844, the Faculty of Humanities judged this proposal to be radical.

== Implementation and use ==
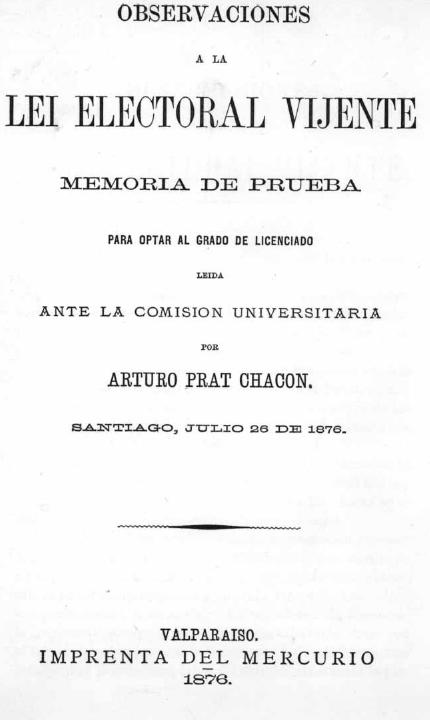
Observaciones a la lei electoral vijente (1876), by Arturo Prat

Bello’s influence had already been seen in the proposal of the “Literary and Scientific Academy of Teachers of Primary Education of Madrid,” which had adopted many of his principles in 1843. However, Isabella II put an end to this project on April 25, 1844, by imposing—through a royal decree—compliance with the Academy by means of the Prontuario de ortografía de la lengua castellana, issued by royal order for use in public schools by the Royal Spanish Academy, in accordance with the system adopted in the ninth edition of its Dictionary. With this publication, the RAE’s agreements regarding orthography acquired normative status, displacing other possible orthography manuals.

Although Bello’s project was not fully implemented, the Faculty of Humanities of the University of Chile proposed some of his ideas in May 1844 to the government of President Bulnes, which followed the recommendation and ultimately adopted that same year the use of the new orthography in education and in the drafting of official documents. The modifications adopted by the Chilean government were as follows:

1. Substituting ⟨j⟩ for "weak" ⟨g⟩ sounds (jeneral, jinebra)
2. Substituting ⟨i⟩ for ⟨y⟩ used as vowels (rei, i);
3. Writing ⟨s⟩ instead of ⟨x⟩ before consonants (testo).
4. Always write the strong sound of this consonant with ⟨rr⟩ (rratón, arrmario).
5. Eliminate silent ⟨h⟩ and ⟨u⟩ (ombre, qeso).

However, the lack of rigor in implementing these modifications caused some of them to fall into disuse, and only the first three remained in force. These changes later spread to Argentina, Colombia, Ecuador, Nicaragua, and Venezuela. In 1847, Bello wrote Gramática de la lengua castellana destinada al uso de los americanos.

Chile was the last country to maintain this orthography, which remained in force there for more than 83 years. Differences in orthographic usage lasted until 1927, when the government of President Carlos Ibáñez del Campo, through Decree 3,876 of the Ministry of Public Instruction, restored the academic norms of the RAE in education and in official documents as of October 12 of that year.

Chilean orthography was studied by the philologist and linguist Rodolfo Lenz, who wrote Observaciones sobre la ortografía de Chile (1891), De la ortografía castellana (1894), and Problemas del Diccionario Castellano en América (1927).

== Similar initiatives ==
The 1956 Nobel Prize-winning author Juan Ramón Jiménez used an orthography similar to Bello's in his work Poemas májicos y dolientes (1909), arguing that "[one] should write as one speaks, out of love for simplicity and out of antipathy toward pedantry". The writer and philosopher Miguel de Unamuno advocated the adoption of "a phonetic and simple orthography" in La raza y la lengua, volume six of his Obras completas, which included his articles on the reform of writing—an idea he also expressed in his "nivola" Niebla (1914). José P. Gómez wrote and published Ortografía ideal: Tratado de reforma ortográfica de la lengua castellana y de fonografía comparada (1914).

The philosopher Jesús Mosterín proposed, both in Ortografía fonémica del español (1981) and in Teoría de la escritura (1993), "a new orthography for Spanish" based on its phonemes. The 1982 Nobel Prize–winning author Gabriel García Márquez revisited, among others, Bello’s proposal, defended the elimination of arbitrary spellings, and called for "jubil[ar] la ortografía" (retiring orthography) at the First International Conference of the Spanish Language, held in Zacatecas, Mexico in 1997.

== See also ==
- Spanish language in the Americas
- Chilean Spanish
- Venezuelan Spanish
- Phonemic orthography
- Real Academia Española
- Spanish orthography
- Spelling reform

== Bibliography ==
- Bello, Andrés y Juan García del Río. (1823) 1826. Indicaciones sobre la conveniencia de simplificar la ortografía en América. Biblioteca Americana (pags 50-66), Londres. Reimpreso en El Repertorio Americano (octubre de 1826, pags. 27-41)
- Bello, Andrés.1827. Ortografía castellana, en El Repertorio Americano (abril de 1827, pags. 10-16). Londres
- Bello, Andrés (1844), Ortografía, en El Araucano 10 y 24 de mayo de 1844, Santiago., archived from the original on 2009-07-19
- Bello, Andrés. 1847. Gramática de la lengua castellana destinada al uso de los americanos
- Carbonell, José Antonio. 2007. Andrés Bello en Babel, trabajo presentado en el IV Congreso Internacional de la Lengua Española 2007. Cartagena de Indias.
- Contreras E, Lidia. 1993. Historia de las ideas ortográficas en Chile Centro de Investigaciones Barros Arana. Santiago.
- Rosenblat, Ángel. 1981. Las ideas ortográficas de Bello, en Andrés Bello, Obras completas, t. V, La Casa de Bello, Caracas, 1981, pp. IX–CXXXVIII.
- Rosenblat, Ángel. 2002. El español de América. Biblioteca Ayacucho, Caracas.
- Lodares, Juan Ramón (2001). Gente de Cervantes: historia humana del idioma español. Spain: Editorial Taurus. ISBN 9788430604234.
- Royal Spanish Academy (1999). "Prólogo". Ortografía de la lengua española. p. V. ISBN 84-239-9250-0. "la llamada "ortografía chilena" difundida por diversos lugares de América [the so-called "Chilean spelling" spread throughout various parts of America]"
- Nebrija, Antonio (2007a). "Capítulo quinto, de las letras y pronunciaciones de la lengua castellana". Gramática de la lengua castellana. Asociación Cultural Antonio de Nebrija.
- Narvaja de Arnoux, Elvira (2006). "Marcar la nación en la lengua: la reforma ortográfica chilena (1843-1844)". Ámbitos. Revista de Estudios de Ciencias Sociales y Humanidades (16): 41–53.
- Mosterín, Jesús (2002). "10. Fonología y ortografía del español". Teoría de la escritura (2nd ed.). Barcelona: Icaria Editorial S.A. pp. 225–341. ISBN 84-7426-199-6.
- Mora Monroy, Siervo Custodio (1998). "Sobre la cambiante ortografía" (PDF). Thesaurus. 53 (3): 572–574.
- Montt, Luis, ed. (1884). "17. Memoria leída a la Facultad de Humanidades el 17 de octubre de 1843 por el licenciado Domingo F. Sarmiento". Noticias de las publicaciones hechas en Chile por don Domingo F. Sarmiento (1841-1871) (PDF). Santiago: Imprenta Gutemberg. pp. 13–19. Archived from the original (PDF) on 6 March 2012.
- Matus, Alfredo (1982). "Don Andrés Bello y la Real Academia Española". In Instituto de Chile (ed.). Homenaje a don Andrés Bello (1st ed.). Santiago: Editorial Jurídica de Chile, editorial Andrés Bello. pp. 75–76.
- Mac-Iver, Enrique (1900). La crisis moral de la república. Santiago. "Es gradable i honroao para mí hablar desde esta tribuna levantada por una asociacion que dedica sus esfuerzos al estudio de las ciencias, al cultivo de las letras i al esclarecimiento de los variados problemas sociolójicos que interesan al pais, i que, en mi concepto, sirve de refujio i amparo a los principios de libertad que, predominantes ayer, peligran hoi ante las tendencias autoritarias i absorbentes creadas por el egoismo de clases i fortificadas por el adulo al poder del número. [It is a pleasure and an honour for me to speak from this platform established by an association that devotes its efforts to the study of science, the cultivation of literature, and the clarification of the various sociological problems that concern the country, and which, in my opinion, serves as a refuge and shelter for the principles of freedom that, predominant yesterday, are today endangered by the authoritarian and absorbing tendencies created by class egoism and fortified by flattery to the power of numbers.]"
- Lope Blanch, Juan Miguel (1990). "Notas sobre los estudios gramaticales en la España del Renacimiento". Estudios de historia lingüística hispánica. Madrid: Arco Libros. p. 55. ISBN 978-8476350898.
- Lastarria, José Victorino (1844). Discursos académicos. Santiago: Imprenta del Siglo. pp. 2–3. "Yo e tenido la onrra de ser designado para llenar aora uno de los mas importantes deberes qe la lei impone a esta ilustre corporacion, tal como el de presentar una memoria sobre alguno de los echos notables de la istoria de Chile, apoyando los pormenores istóricos en documentos auténticos i desenvolviendo su carácter i consecuencias con imparcialidad i verdad [...] La istoria es para los pueblos lo qe es para el ombre su esperiencia particular: tal como este prosigue su carrera de perfeccion, apelando siempre a sus recuerdos, a las verdades qe le a echo concebir su propia sensibilidad, a las observaciones qe le sujieren los echos qe le rodean desde su infancia, la sociedad debe igualmente en las diversas épocas de su vida, acudir a la istoria, en qe se alla consignada la esperiencia de todo el jénero umano, a ese gran espejo de los tiempos, para iluminarse en sus reflejos. [I have had the honour of being appointed to fulfil one of the most important duties that the law imposes on this illustrious corporation, namely to present a report on some of the notable events in the history of Chile, supporting the historical details with authentic documents and developing their character and consequences with impartiality and truth [...] History is to peoples what personal experience is to individuals: just as individuals pursue their path to perfection, always drawing on their memories, on the truths that their own sensibilities have led them to conceive, on the observations suggested by the events that have surrounded them since childhood, society must likewise, at various stages of its life, turn to history, in which the experience of the whole human race is recorded, to that great mirror of the times, in order to be enlightened by its reflections.]"
- Hidalgo, Dionisio (1870). Diccionario general de bibliografía española: "Los amigos"-"Themis". Vol. 4. Madrid: Imprenta de J. Limia y G. Urosa. p. 412.
- Gómez, José P. (1914). Ortografía ideal: Tratado de reforma ortográfica de la lengua castellana y de fonografía comparada (1st ed.). Fernando Fé.
- García Márquez, Gabriel (April 1997). "Botella al mar para el dios de las palabras". I Congreso Internacional de la Lengua Española. Zacatecas. Archived from the original on 18 May 2015. "Jubilemos la ortografía, terror del ser humano desde la cuna: enterremos las haches rupestres, firmemos un tratado de límites entre la ge y jota, y pongamos más uso de razón en los acentos escritos, que al fin y al cabo nadie ha de leer lagrima donde diga lágrima ni confundirá revólver con revolver. ¿Y qué de nuestra be de burro y nuestra ve de vaca, que los abuelos españoles nos trajeron como si fueran dos y siempre sobra una? [Let's retire spelling, the terror of human beings from the cradle: let's bury the cave-like H's, sign a treaty on the boundaries between G and J, and use more common sense in written accents, because at the end of the day, no one is going to read "lagrima" where it says "lágrima" or confuse "revólver" with "revolver". And what about our "be" in "burro" and our "ve" in "vaca", which our Spanish grandparents brought us as if they were two and there is always one left over?]"
- Esteve Serrano, Abraham (1982). "I. Los principios ortográficos". Estudios de teoría ortográfica del español. Murcia: University of Murcia. pp. 15–105. ISBN 84-86031-14-1.
- Bustos Tovar, José Jesús de (1998). "Las propuestas ortográficas de Gonzalo Correas". Dicenda. Cuadernos de Filología Hispánica (16). Servicio de Publicaciones de la Universidad Complutense de Madrid: 41–62. ISSN 0212-2952.
- Unamuno, Miguel (2010). "Capítulo VIII". In Juan Herrero Senés (ed.). Niebla (1st ed.). United States: Stockcero, Inc. p. 59. ISBN 978-1-934768-36-5. "Hay que escribir el castellano con ortografía fonética. ¡Nada de ces!, ¡guerra a la ce! Za, ze, zi, zo, zu con zeta y ka, ke, ki, ko, ku con ka. ¡Y fuera las haches! ¡La hache es el absurdo, la reacción, la autoridad, la edad media, el retroceso! ¡Guerra a la hache! [Spanish must be written using phonetic spelling. No more "ces"! War on the letter "ce"! "Za", "ze", "zi", "zo", "zu" with "zeta" and "ka", "ke", "ki", "ko", "ku" with "ka". And away with the letter "h"! The letter "h" is absurd, reactionary, authoritarian, medieval, backward! War on the letter "h"!]"
- Nebrija, Antonio (2007b). "Libro primero, en que trata de la ortographia - Capítulo quinto, de las letras y pronunciaciones de la lengua castellana". In Asociación Cultural Antonio de Nebrija (ed.). Gramática de la lengua castellana.
