= Monument to Hispanidad (Madrid) =

Monument in Madrid, Spain

A la Hispanidad
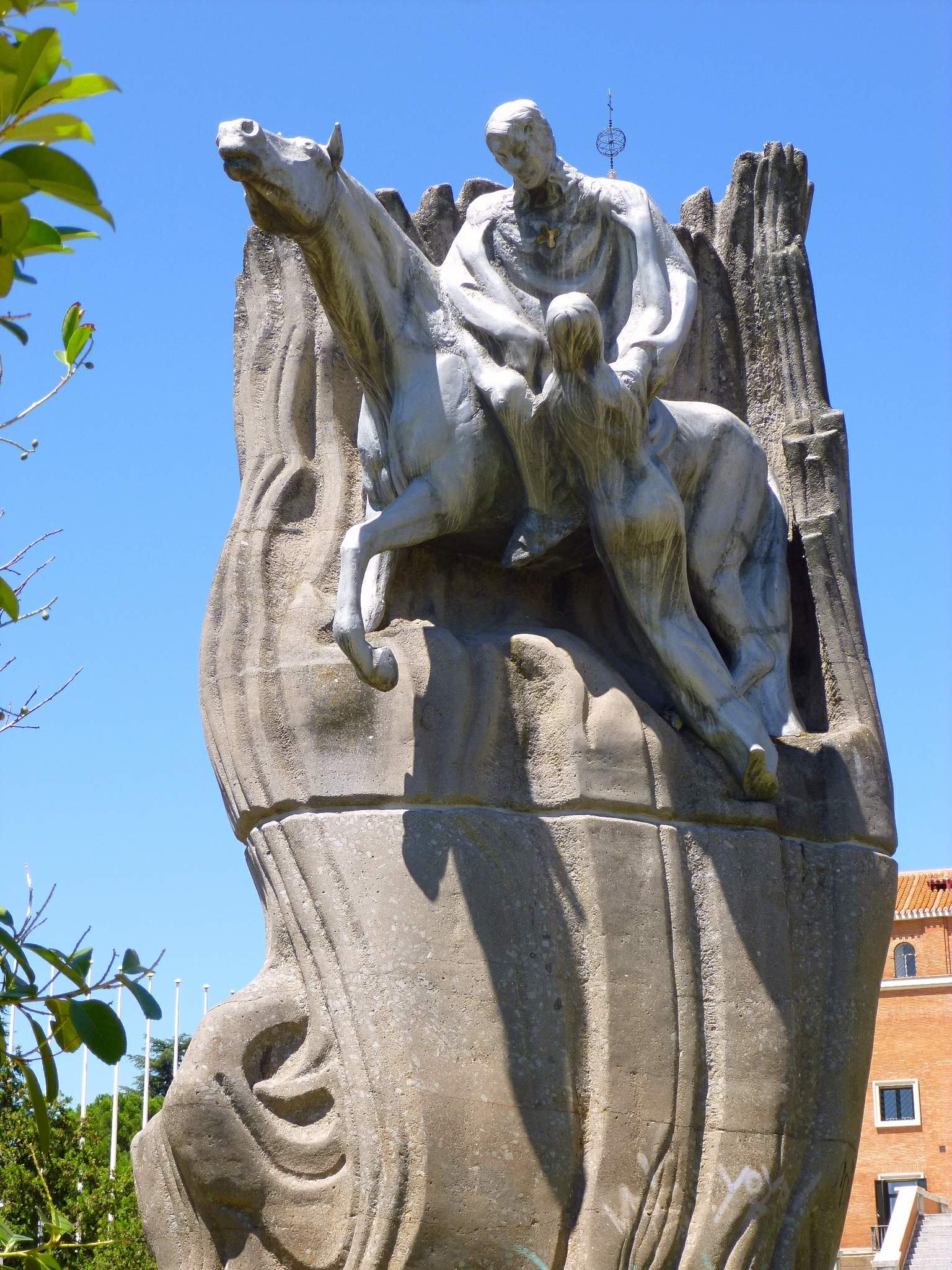
- 40.437643°N 3.721232°W
- Location: Ciudad Universitaria, Madrid, Spain
- Designer: Agustín de la Herrán
- Opening date: 5 June 1971
- Dedicated to: Hispanidad

A la Hispanidad or the Monument to Hispanidad (Spanish: Monumento a la Hispanidad) is an instance of public art in Madrid, Spain. The sculptural group is an allegory of the "meeting" of two civilizations.

== History and description ==
It is located in front of the Museum of the Americas in the Ciudad Universitaria campus. Opened on June 5, 1971, during a ceremony attended by the then Prince Juan Carlos de Borbón, it is a work by Agustín de la Herrán Matorras, a Spanish sculptor. It was part of a wider initiative of the Francoist regime for the construction of memorials in the Spanish capital trying to complement its programme of Ibero-American cooperation with symbolical content, also featuring other works dedicated to the likes of Simón Bolívar, José de San Martín, José Gervasio Artigas, Vasco Núñez de Balboa, Rubén Darío or Andrés Bello.

The sculptural group represents an old holm oak trunk featuring three distinctive elements on its upper part: a Spanish warrior mounted on his horse helping to raise an indigenous woman, representing the Americas. On the back of the sculpture, there's an inscription alluding to the inauguration of the monument.

The ensemble has been described as "thoroughly flawed" as well as evocative of "the violence of abduction".
