= Monument to Andrés Bello =

Monument in Madrid, Spain

Andrés Bello
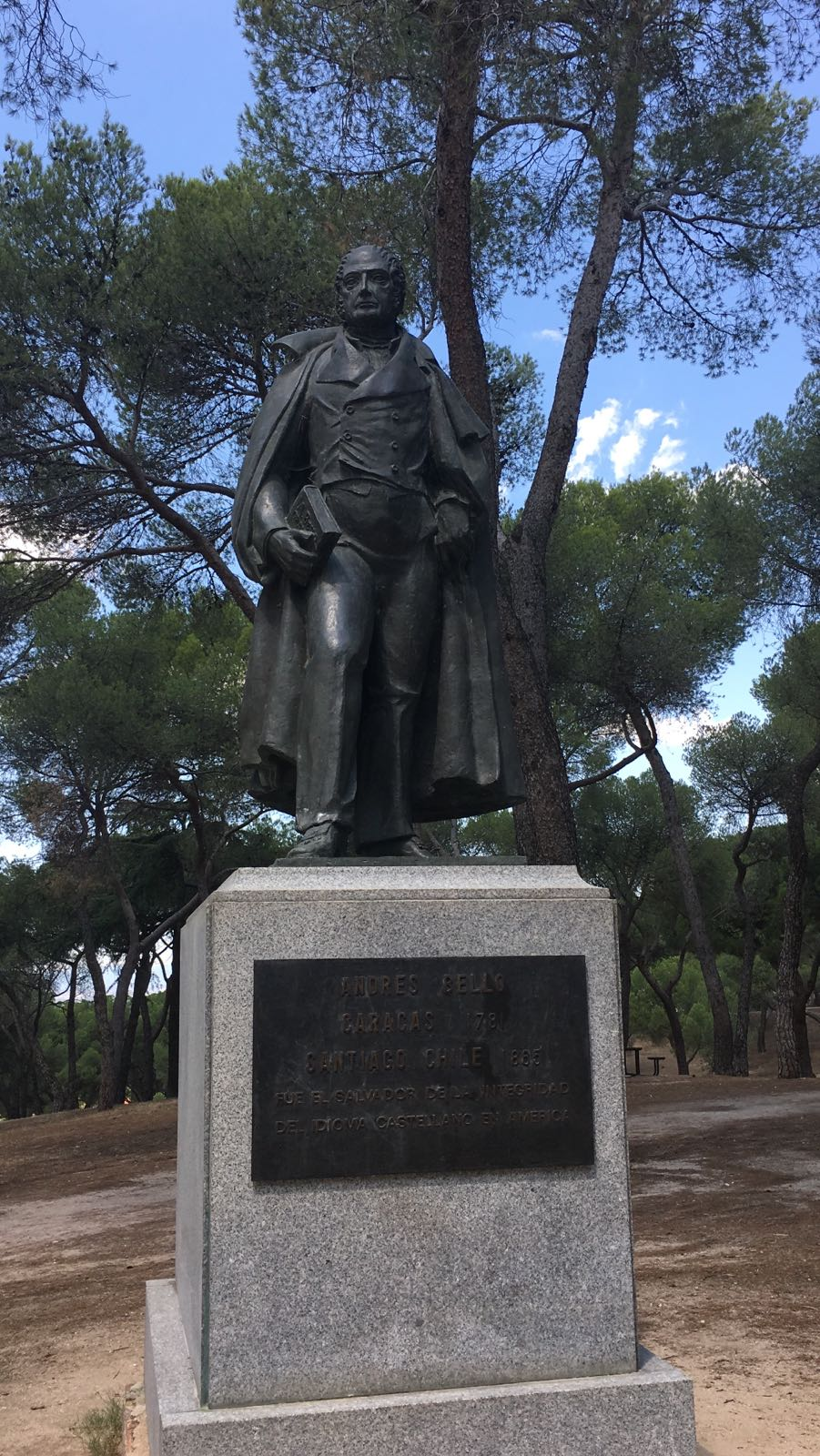
- 40.455068°N 3.720545°W
- Location: Dehesa de la Villa, Madrid, Spain
- Designer: Juan Abascal Fuentes
- Opening date: 26 April 1972
- Dedicated to: Andrés Bello

The Monument of Andrés Bello is an instance of public art in Madrid, Spain. Located in the Dehesa de la Villa, the monument consists of a bronze statue of Andrés Bello on top of a granite pedestal.

== History and description ==
Cast in bronze and standing 2-metre high, the statue was designed by Juan Abascal Fuentes. The sculpture depicts a full-body standing figure of Bello, holding his famous Spanish Grammar book for Americans with his right hand. The bronze is on top of a granite pedestal. It can be considered part of wider plan of the Francoist regime for the construction of memorials in the Spanish capital trying to complement its programme of Ibero-American cooperation with symbolical content, also featuring other works dedicated to the likes of Simón Bolívar, José de San Martín, José Gervasio Artigas, Vasco Núñez de Balboa, Rubén Darío or the Hispanidad itself.

Lobbied by Venezuelan ambassador Carlos Capriles Ayala, the monument was unveiled on 26 April 1972, during a ceremony presided by Gregorio López Bravo (Minister of Foreign Affairs) and Alfredo Sánchez Bella (Minister of Information and Tourism), Edgar Sanabria (Venezuelan representative), Carlos Arias Navarro (Mayor of Madrid) and diplomats in representation of a number of Latin American republics.

The inscriptions on the monument read "andrés bello / caracas 1781 / santiago chile 1865 / fue el salvador de la integridad / del idioma castellano en américa" ("he was the savior of the integrity of the Spanish language in America") and "este monumento fue erigido en abril de 1972 a iniciativa de la embajada de Venezuela" ("This monument was erected in April 1972 on the initiative of the Venezuelan embassy").
