= Monument to Vasco Núñez de Balboa (Madrid) =

Vasco Núñez de Balboa
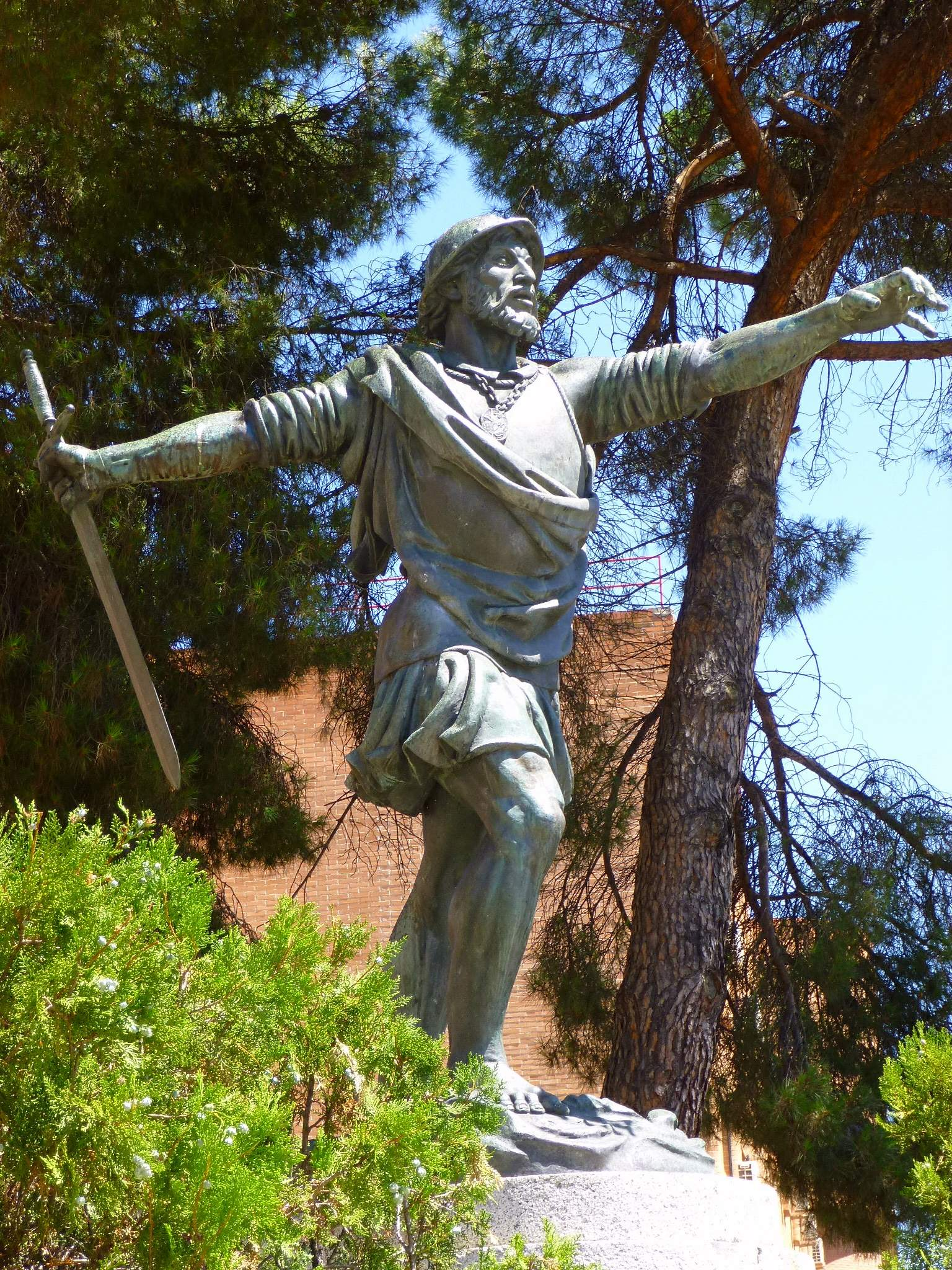
- Interactive map of Vasco Núñez de Balboa
- Location: Ciudad Universitaria, Madrid, Spain
- Coordinates: 40.438051°N 3.721261°W
- Designer: Enrique Pérez Comendador
- Material: Bronze
- Opening date: 2 October 1954
- Dedicated to: Vasco Núñez de Balboa

The Statue of Vasco Núñez de Balboa is an instance of public art in Madrid, Spain. Located in the Ciudad Universitaria, next to the Museum of the Americas, it consists of a bronze sculpture of Vasco Núñez de Balboa, best known for his exploration across the Isthmus of Panama and the discovery of the Pacific Ocean.

== History and description ==
The inception of the idea traces back to the 6th Congress of the Postal Union of the Americas and Spain celebrated in 1952. It received support from a number of Spanish ministerial departments. It can be considered part of a plan of Francoist regime for the construction of memorials in the Spanish capital trying to complement its programme of Ibero-American cooperation with symbolical content, also featuring other works dedicated to the likes of Simón Bolívar, José de San Martín, José Gervasio Artigas, Rubén Darío, Andrés Bello or the Hispanidad itself.

The project was awarded to Enrique Pérez Comendador, who, after some earlier models, opted for a figure performing a cross-like posture with the arms stretched forward and backward, somewhat influenced by the Artemision Bronze. Cast in bronze, the statue stands 2,50 metre high.

In the words of the sculptor, the sculpture represented Vasco Núñez de Balboa "at the moment when, after the discovery, he enters arrogantly and absorbed in the sea wielding the naked sword and takes possession of it for the King of Spain, looking at the horizon, as if transfigured before the immensity of the great Pacific Ocean".

It was unveiled on 2 October 1954 at its location in Ciudad Universitaria.
