= Enemy =

Individual or a group that is considered as forcefully adverse or threatening

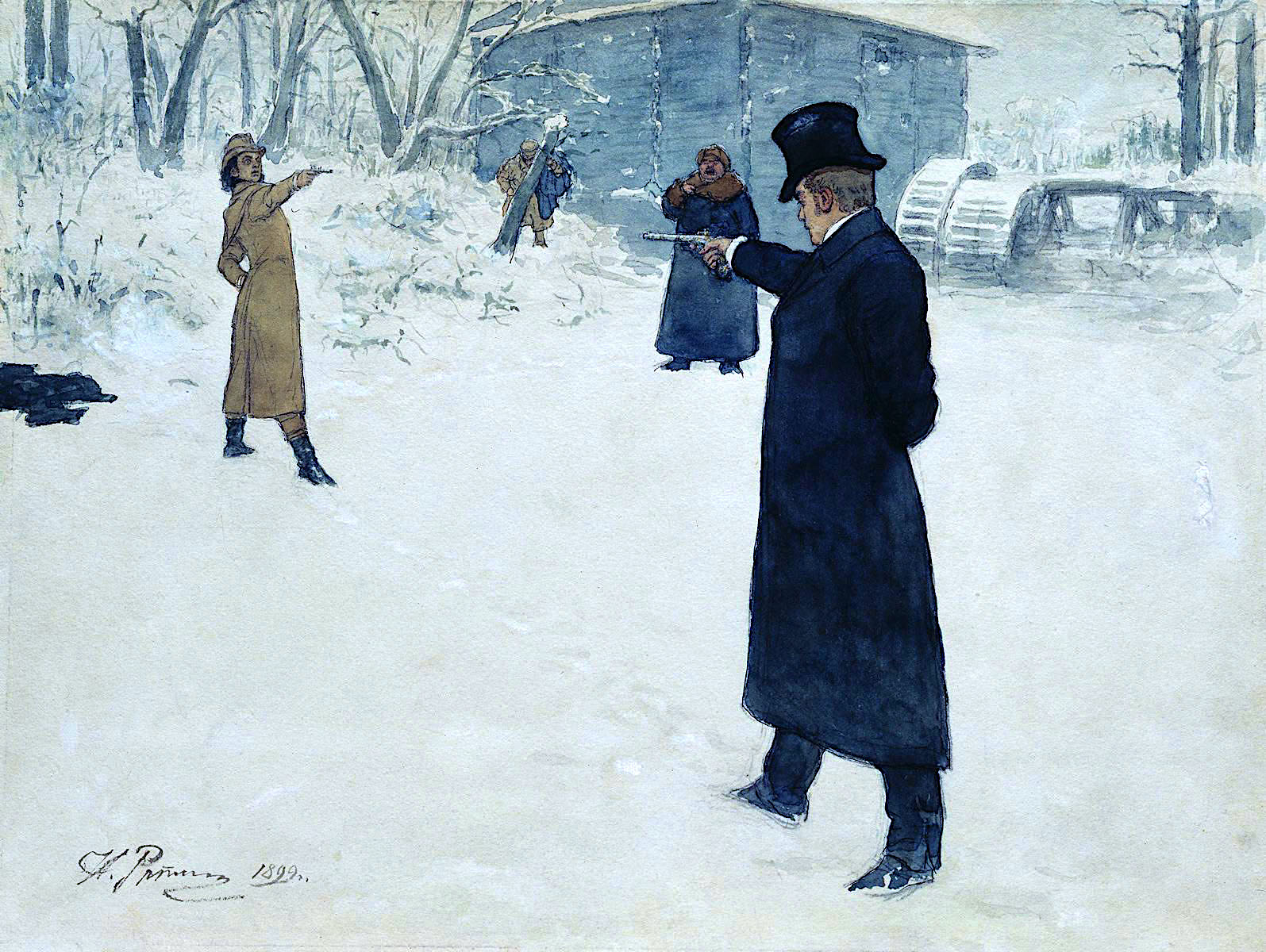
Duel between two enemies; here, the characters of Eugene Onegin and Vladimir Lensky from the novel, Eugene Onegin (1833)

An enemy or a foe is an individual or a group that is considered as forcefully adverse or threatening. The concept of an enemy has been observed to be "basic for both individuals and communities". The term "enemy" serves the social function of designating a particular entity as a threat, thereby invoking an intense emotional response to that entity. The state of being or having an enemy is enmity, foehood or foeship.

== Terms ==
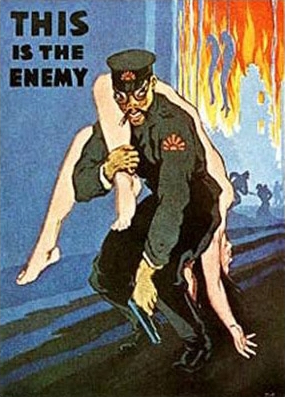
War-time propaganda representation of the Japanese Imperial Army, an enemy of the United States at the time

Enemy comes from the 9th century Latin word inimi, derived from Latin for "bad friend" (Latin: inimicus) through French. "Enemy" is a strong word, and "emotions associated with the enemy would include anger, hatred, frustration, envy, jealousy, fear, distrust, and possibly grudging respect". As a political concept, an enemy is likely to be met with hate, violence, battle and war. The opposite of an enemy is a friend or ally. Because the term "the enemy" is a bit bellicose and militaristic to use in polite society, informal substitutes are more often used. Often the substituted terms become pejoratives in the context that they are used. In any case, the designation of an "enemy" exists solely to denote the status of a particular group of people as a threat, and to propagate this designation within the local context. Substituted terms for an enemy often go further to meaningfully identify a known group as an enemy, and to pejoratively frame that identification. A government may seek to represent a person or group as a threat to the public good by designating that person or group to be a public enemy, or an enemy of the people.

The characterization of an individual or/and group as an enemy is called demonization. The propagation of demonization is a major aspect of propaganda. An "enemy" may also be conceptual; used to describe impersonal phenomena such disease, and a host of other things. In theology, "the Enemy" is typically reserved to represent an evil deity, devil or a demon. For example, "in early Iroquois legend, the Sun and Moon, as god and goddess of Day and Night, had already acquired the characters of the great friend and enemy of man, the Good and Evil Deity". Conversely, some religions describe a monotheistic God as an enemy; for example, in 1 Samuel 28:16, the spirit of Samuel tells a disobedient Saul: "Wherefore then dost thou ask of me, seeing the LORD is departed from thee, and is become thine enemy?"

"The enemy," as the object of social anger or repulsion, has throughout history been used as the prototypical propaganda tool to focus the fear and anxiety within a society toward a particular target. The target is often general, as with an ethnic group or race of people, or it can also be a conceptual target, as with an ideology which characterizes a particular group. In some cases the concept of the enemy have morphed; whereas once racial and ethnic claims to support a call to war may later have changed to ideological and conceptual based claims.

During the Cold War, the terms "Communists" or "Reds" were believed by many in American society to mean "the enemy," and the meaning of the two terms could be extremely pejorative, depending on the political context, mood, or state of fear and agitation within the society at the time.

There are many terms and phrases that allude to overlooking or failing to notice an enemy, such as Trojan horse or wolf in sheep's clothing. Generally, the counterpoint to an enemy is a friend or ally, although the term frenemy has been coined to capture the sense of a relationship wherein the parties are allied for some purposes and at odds with one another for other purposes.

== As a function of social science ==
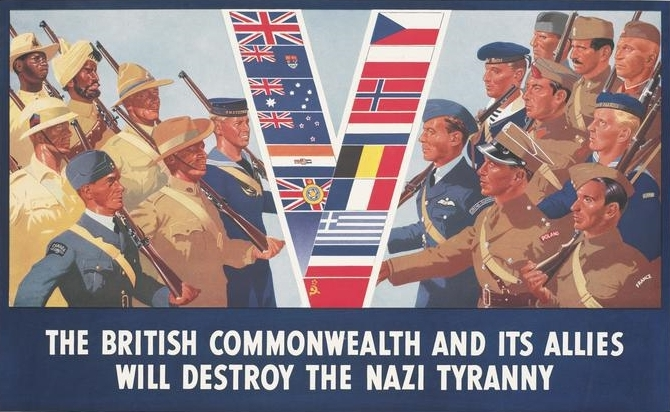
Unity of various countries against a common enemy

The existence or perceived existence of a collective enemy tends to increase the cohesiveness of the group. However, the identification and treatment of other entities as enemies may be irrational, and a sign of a psychological dysfunction. For example, group polarization may devolve into groupthink, which may lead members of the "in" group to perceive nonmembers or other groups as enemies even where the others present neither antagonism nor an actual threat. Paranoid schizophrenia is characterized by the irrational belief that other people, ranging from family members and personal acquaintances to celebrities seen on television, are personal enemies plotting harm to the sufferer. Irrational approaches may extend to treating impersonal phenomena not merely as conceptual enemies, but as sentient actors intentionally bringing strife to the sufferer.

The concept of the enemy is well covered in the field of peace and conflict studies, which is available as a major at many major universities. In peace studies, enemies are those entities who are perceived as frustrating or preventing achievement of a goal. The enemy may not even know they are being regarded as such, since the concept is one-sided.

Thus, in order to achieve peace, one must eliminate the threat. This can be achieved by:

- destroying the enemy
- changing one's perception of an entity as enemy
- achieving the goal the enemy is frustrating.

Personal conflicts are frequently either unexamined (one's goals are not well defined) or examined only from one point of view. This means it is often possible to resolve conflict (to eliminate the cause of the conflict) by redefining goals such that the frustration (not the person) is eliminated, obvious, negotiated away, or decided upon.

== In literature ==
In literature, stories are often developed by presenting a primary character, the protagonist, as overcoming obstacles presented by an antagonist who is depicted as a personal enemy of the protagonist. Serial fictional narratives of heroes often present the hero contending against an archenemy whose capabilities match or exceed those of the hero, thereby establishing tension as to whether the hero will be able to defeat this enemy. The enemy may be displayed as an evil character who plans to harm innocents, so that the reader will side with the protagonist in the need to battle the enemy.

== Treatment ==
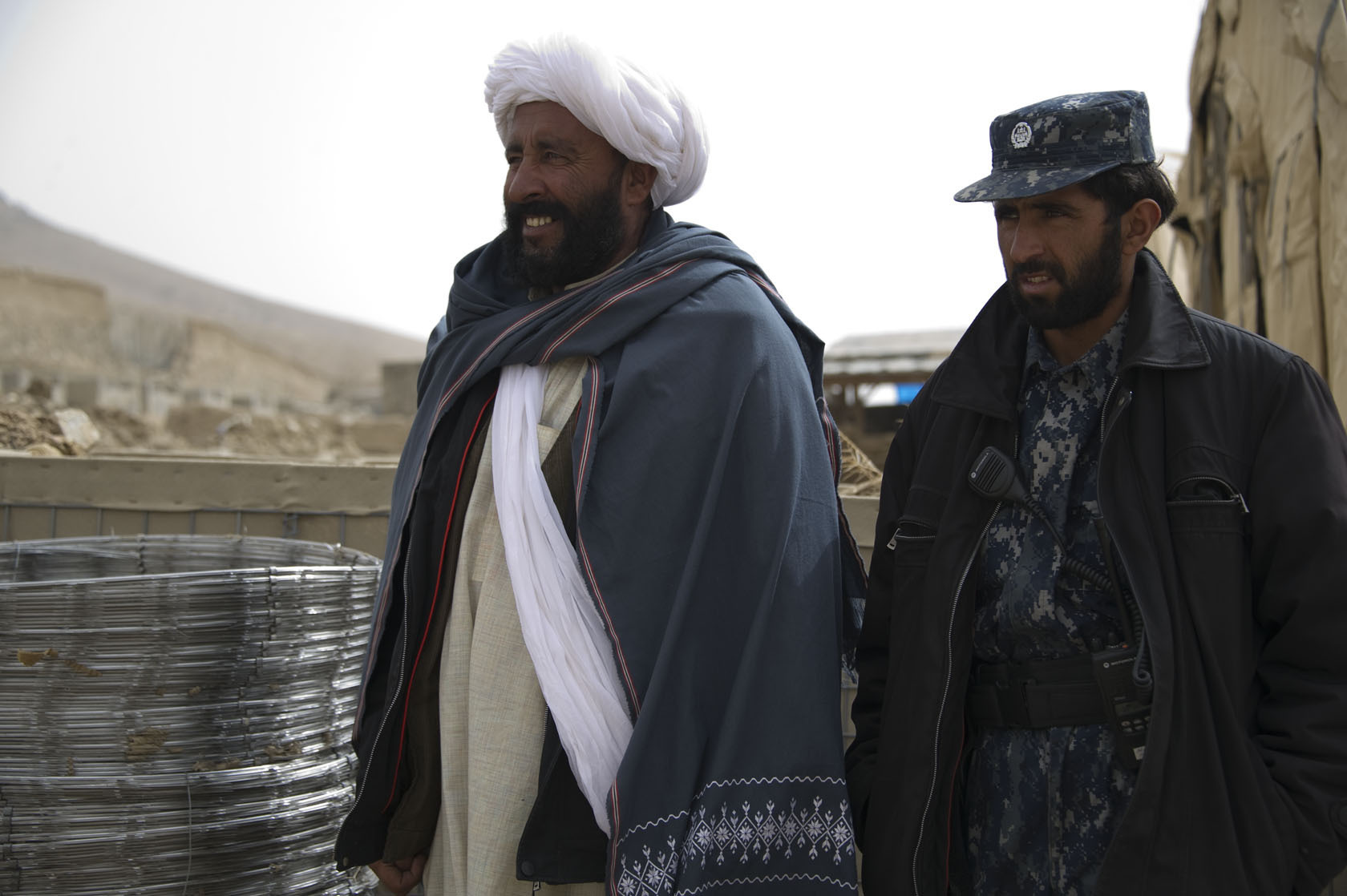
Former enemy rebel (on the left) forgiven by a police commander (on the right)

Various legal and theological regimes exist governing the treatment of enemies. Many religions have precepts favoring forgiveness and reconciliation with enemies. The Jewish Encyclopedia states that "[h]atred of an enemy is a natural impulse of primitive peoples", while "willingness to forgive an enemy is a mark of advanced moral development". It contends that the teaching of the Bible, Talmud, and other writings, "gradually educates the people toward the latter stage", stating that "indications in the Bible of a spirit of hatred and vengeance toward the enemy... are for the most part purely nationalistic expressions—hatred of the national enemy being quite compatible with an otherwise kindly spirit".

=== Religious doctrines ===
According to the Dalai Lama, virtually all major religions have "similar ideals of love, the same goal of benefiting humanity through spiritual practice, and the same effect of making their followers into better human beings". It is therefore widely expressed in world religions that enemies should be treated with love, kindness, compassion, and forgiveness.

The Book of Exodus states: "If thou meet thine enemy's ox or his ass going astray, thou shalt surely bring it back to him again. If thou see the ass of him that hateth thee lying under his burden, and thou wouldest forbear to help him, thou shalt surely help with him." The Book of Proverbs similarly states: "Rejoice not when thine enemy falleth and let not thy heart be glad when he stumbleth", and: "If thine enemy be hungry give him bread to eat, and if he be thirsty give him water to drink. For thus shalt thou heap coals of fire upon his head, and the Lord shall reward thee". The Jewish Encyclopedia contends that the opinion that the Old Testament commanded hatred of the enemy derives from a misunderstanding of the Sermon on the Mount, wherein Jesus said: "Ye have heard that it hath been said, Thou shalt love thy neighbor and hate thine enemy. But I say unto you, Love your enemies and pray for them that persecute you".

The Jewish Encyclopedia also cites passages in the Talmud stating: "If a man finds both a friend and an enemy requiring assistance he should assist his enemy first in order to subdue his evil inclination", and: "Who is strong? He who converts an enemy into a friend".

The concept of Ahimsa, found in Hinduism, Jainism and Buddhism, also captures this sentiment, requiring kindness and non-violence towards all living things on the basis that they all are connected. Indian leader Mohandas Karamchand Gandhi strongly believed in this principle, stating that "[t]o one who follows this doctrine there is no room for an enemy".

In 1 Corinthians 15:25-26 in the New Testament, Saint Paul refers to Christ's reign with all his enemies under his feet, until finally death, the last enemy, is destroyed. Methodist writer Joseph Benson notes from this text that this enemy, death, "continues, in some measure, to hold the subjects of Christ under his dominion" until the end.

== See also ==
- Anti-fan
- Demonization
- Enemy combatant
- Frenemy
- List of standalone war memorials to the enemy
- Rivalry
