= Gazeta de Caracas =

First newspaper printed in Venezuela

La Gazeta de Caracas
- Type: Newspaper
- Format: ?
- Owner: ?
- Editor: Andrés Bello
- Founded: 1808
- Ceased publication: 1822
- Headquarters: Caracas; Venezuela

La Gazeta de Caracas (Spanish: The Caracas Gazette) was the first newspaper printed in Venezuela; its first issue was published on 24 October 1808. In 1814, its name changed to Gaceta de Caracas. The newspaper was issued, with some interruptions, until January 1822.

It was printed by the Britons Matthew Gallagher and James Lamb, who had brought a printing press from Trinidad. They became the first typographers working in Venezuela.

The newspaper published news and ideas favorable toward the current government, which would subject it to rapid changes in editorial policies as the Venezuelan War of Independence raged; its sympathies alternated between royalist and republican, somewhat undermining its credibility.

Andrés Bello was almost permanently editor of the newspaper until it changed name in 1814.

The significance of having newspapers in South America at the turn of the 19th century has been linked to the causation of nationalism worldwide. This idea is explored in Benedict Anderson's book Imagined Communities.

== Sources ==
- "PAPEL DE LA PRENSA EN LA HISTORIA DE VENEZUELA (1808 - 1900)".
