= Andrés Bello =

Venezuelan-Chilean poet, humanist and diplomat (1781–1865)

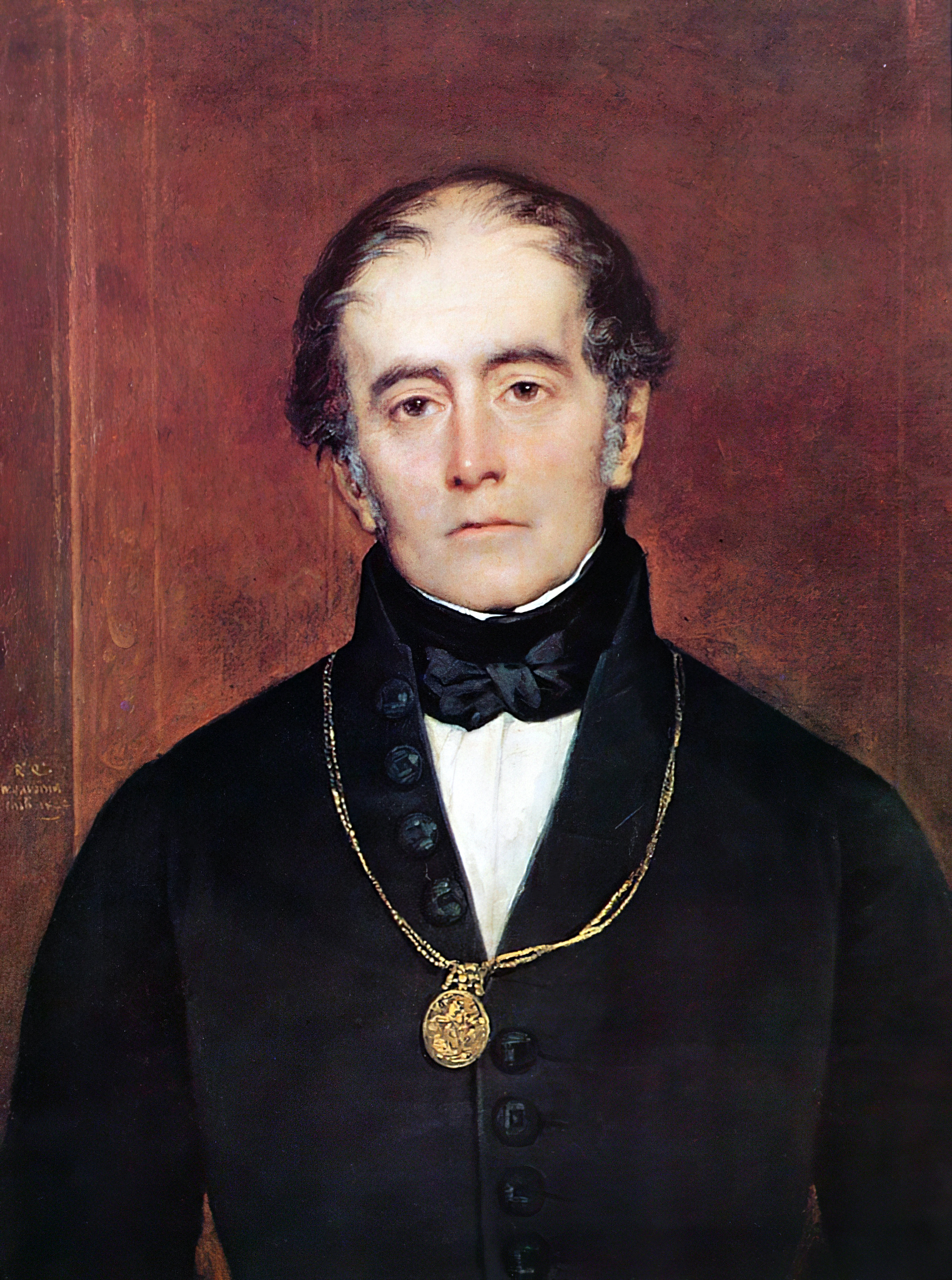
- Portrait by Raymond Monvoisin
- Born: Andrés de Jesús María y José Bello López; November 29, 1781; Caracas, Captaincy General of Venezuela, Spanish Empire
- Died: October 15, 1865 (aged 83); Santiago, Chile

Signature
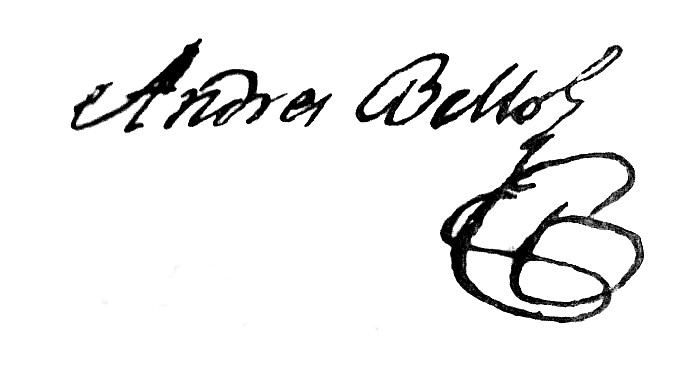

Andrés de Jesús María y José Bello López (Spanish pronunciation: [anˈdɾes ˈβeʝo]; November 29, 1781 – October 15, 1865) was a Venezuelan humanist, diplomat, poet, legislator, philosopher, educator and philologist, whose political and literary works constitute an important part of Spanish American culture. Bello is featured on the old 1992 50 and 1998 2,000 Venezuelan bolívar notes and the 20,000 Chilean peso notes.

In Caracas, where he was born, Andrés Bello was Simón Bolívar's teacher for a short period of time and participated in efforts that led to Venezuelan independence. As a diplomat for the new independent government that he helped establish, he went with Luis López Méndez and Simón Bolívar on their first diplomatic mission to London. He lived in London from 1810 to 1829.

In 1829, Bello went with his family to Chile. He was hired by the Chilean government and made great works in the field of law and humanities. In Santiago he held positions as a senator and a professor, as well as directing several local newspapers. As a legislator, he was the main promoter and editor of the Chilean Civil Code, one of the most innovative and influential American legal works of his time. In 1842, under his inspiration and with his decisive support, the University of Chile was created, an institution of which he became the first rector, staying in the post for more than two decades. Due to his contributions, on 17 October 1832 he was given Chilean nationality through a law approved by the Congress.

== Biographical information ==
=== Life in Venezuela (1781-1810) ===
Bello was born in Caracas and grew up studying at the academy of Ramón Vanlonsten. He was the first son of the lawyer don Bartolomé Bello and Ana Antonia López, whose parents descended from residents of the Canary Islands. He also frequented the Convent of las Mercedes, where he studied Latin under Father Cristobal de Quesada. After the monk's death in 1796, Bello translated Book V of the Aeneid.

He studied Liberal Arts, Law and Medicine at the University of Caracas and graduated on May 9, 1800, with a degree of Bachelor of Arts. As well as having unfinished studies in law and medicine, he also learned English and French on his own. He gave private classes, with the young Simón Bolívar among his students. His translations and adaptations of classic texts gave him prestige, and in 1802 won, by contest, the rank of officer Second Secretary of the colonial government. During the period 1802–1810, Bello became one of the most intellectually influential people in the society of Caracas, standing in performing political work for the colonial administration, besides gaining notoriety as a poet, translating the tragedy Zulima by Voltaire. He later became known for his early writings and translations, edited the newspaper Gazeta de Caracas and held important offices in the government of the Captaincy General of Venezuela. He accompanied Alexander von Humboldt in a part of his Latin American expedition (1800) and was for a short time Simón Bolívar's teacher. His relationships with both men became a major factor in cultivating his ideas for his intellectual career.

Bello spent ten years after his formal education in his homeland of Caracas. He authored two literary works, Calendario manual y guía universal del forastero en Venezuela para el año de 1810 and the Resumen de la historia de Venezuela.

Both works became widely accepted in Venezuela, and from this point Bello started his career as a poet. As time progressed, Bello further expanded his notions on humanism and conservatism. From his theories and ideas, Bello was eventually hailed as one of the foremost humanists of his time.

On April 19, 1810, Bello participated in events that helped to spark the independence of Venezuela, including the dismissal of Captain General Vicente Emparan by the Cabildo de Caracas. The Supreme Junta of Caracas, the institution that governed the Captaincy General of Venezuela following the forced resignation of Emparan, and immediately named Bello First Officer of the Ministry of Foreign Affairs. On June 10 of that year, he set sail on a diplomatic mission to London as a representative of the new Republic. He was commissioned, together with Simón Bolívar and Luis López Méndez, to obtain British support for the cause of independence. Bello was chosen for his knowledge and command of the English language, which he had acquired predominantly on his own.

=== Life in Britain (1810-1829) ===
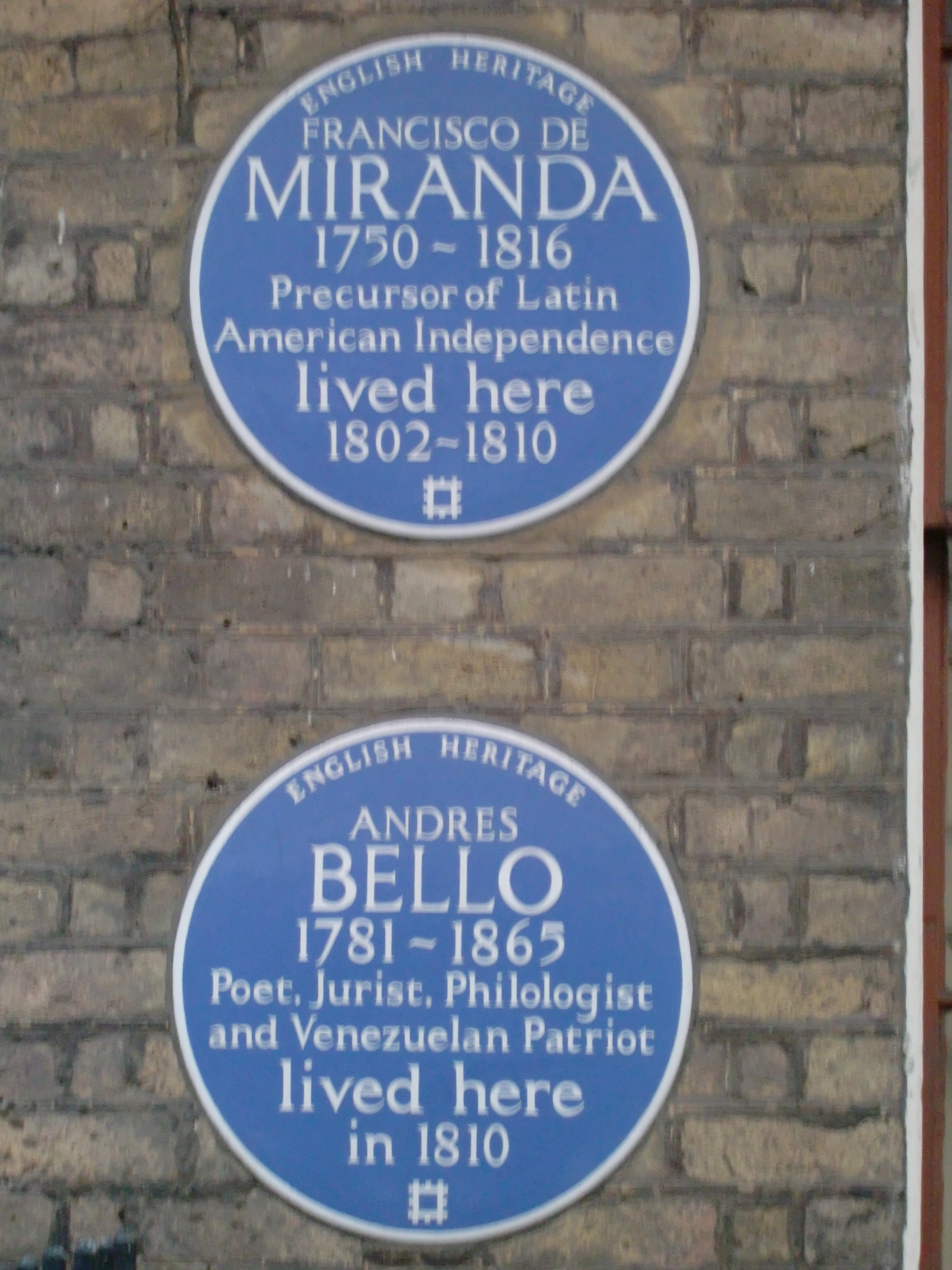
Blue plaque commemorating Bello on 58 Grafton Way, London

As First Officer of Venezuela's Foreign Secretariat after the coup on April 19, 1810, he was sent to London with Simón Bolívar and Luis López Méndez serving as Diplomatic Representative to procure funds for the revolutionary effort until 1813. Bello landed at Portsmouth as an attaché to Bolívar's mission in July 1810. Bello had an admittedly hard life throughout his stay in England, though he managed to further develop his ideas and took a particular interest in England's social changes from the industrial and agricultural revolution. In order to earn a living while in London, Bello taught Spanish and tutored Lord Hamilton's children. In London, he met Francisco de Miranda and became a frequent visitor of his library in Grafton Way, as well as of the British Museum. Along with Bello, Bolívar and López also became friends with Miranda and used their opportunity to become known thanks to Miranda's accomplishments. During his lengthy stay in England, he curbed his feelings of homesickness and became contemporaries with thinkers and intellectuals such as José María Blanco White, Bartólome José Gallardo, Vicente Rocafuerte to name a few. He stayed in London for nineteen years acting as a secretary to legations and diplomatic affairs for Chile and Colombia. In his free time he was involved in study, teaching and journalism. An English Heritage blue plaque commemorates Bello at 58 Grafton Way, his Fitzrovia address.

In 1812, Andrés Bello suffered economically as he tried to return home to Venezuela. The earthquake that occurred March 26, 1812, prevented Bello's family from helping him financially in his return. The fall of the First Republic ended the mode of financial support he received from Latin America and the arrest of Francisco de Miranda did not make any thing better.

In 1814, Andrés Bello married Mary Ann Boyland, a 20-year-old Englishwoman. They had three children, Carlos Bello Boyland (1815–1854), Francisco Bello Boyland (1817–1845), and Juan Pablo Antonio Bello Boyland (1820–1821). His family situation was constantly affected by his financial situation forcing him to always find new work. He worked for the government of Cundinamarca in 1815 and the United Provinces of the Río de la Plata the following year. In 1821, his wife died of tuberculosis and shortly after his son, Juan Pablo died as well.

In 1823, Bello published the Biblioteca América with Juan Garcia del Rio which was widely hailed in Europe. Their collaboration included a reform of Spanish orthography that became official in several Spanish American countries, most lastingly in Chile. In 1826 he published the journal Repertorio Americano to which he frequently contributed as both editor and poet. His two epic poems by which he was made famous, entitled Las Silvas Americanas, were originally published during his time in London around 1826 and documented the emerging culture of the New World. The second of the poems La agricultura de la zona tórrida is the most famous of the two, and is a poetic description of South America's tropical lands in a style reminiscent of Virgil, a poet of great influence for Bello. His situation temporarily got better in 1822 when Antonio José de Irisarri, a Chilean minister in London, named Bello interim secretary of the legation.

On February 24, 1824, Bello remarried Isabel Antonia Dunn, with whom he had 12 children (three born in London and the rest in Chile). Bello was able to become interim secretary again but for Colombia and took charge on February 7, 1825. This job was not what he expected as he was paid irregularly due to the financial crisis in Latin America.

In December 1826, Bello wrote a letter to Bolívar asking him to help out with his financial situation in London. Not only did he write because of his economic crisis, but because he believed that his friendship with Bolívar had disappeared. In April 1827, Bello wrote to Bolívar again but his situation did not get any better. Their friendship eventually came to an end when Bolívar gave Bello's position to someone else and Bello had to find another job.

In 1828, the government of Chile offered Bello a job in the Ministry of Finance and on February 14, 1829, he finally left the United Kingdom.

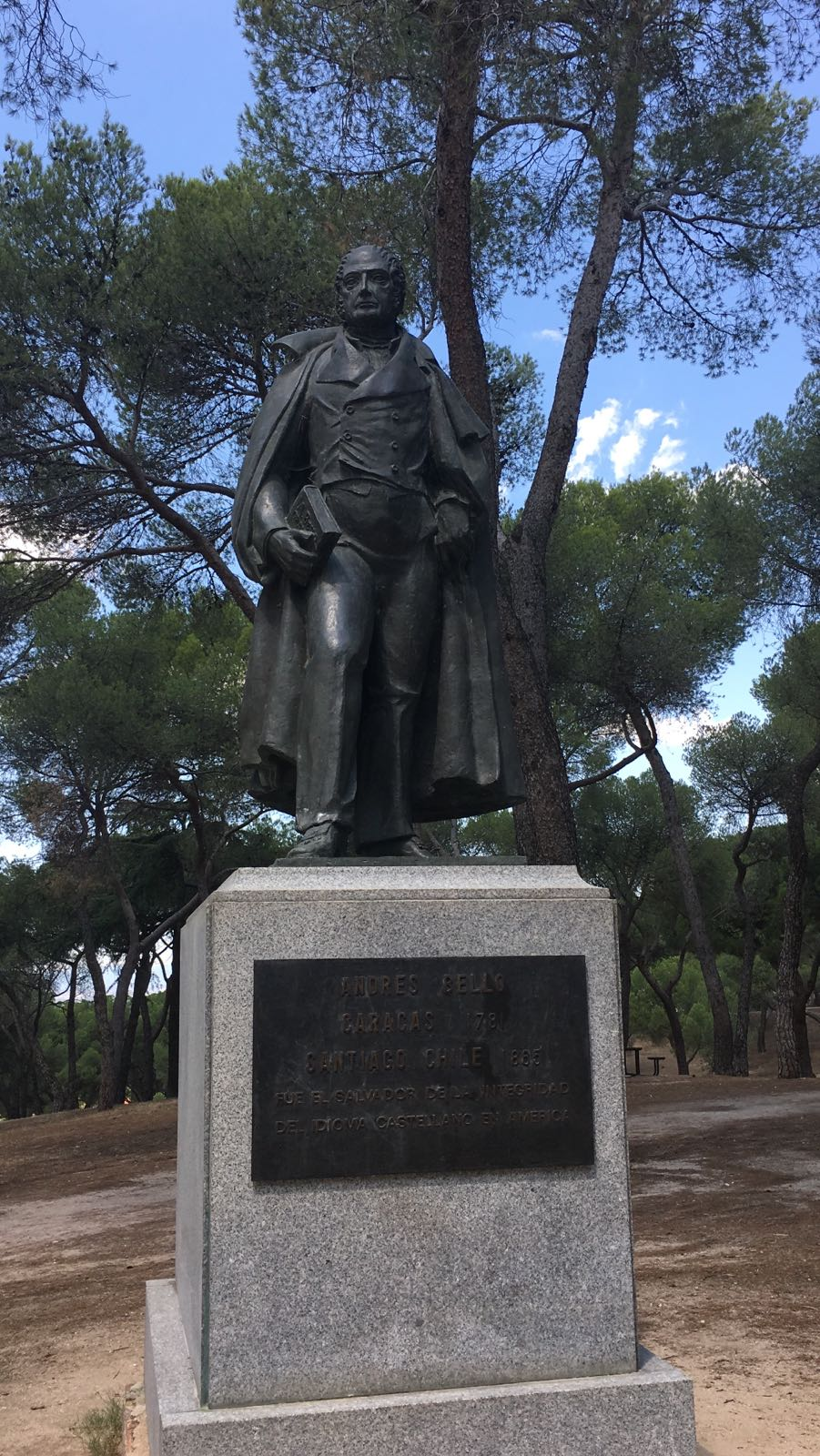
Statue of Andrés Bello in the Dehesa de la Villa, Madrid (Spain).

=== Life in Chile (1829-1865) ===
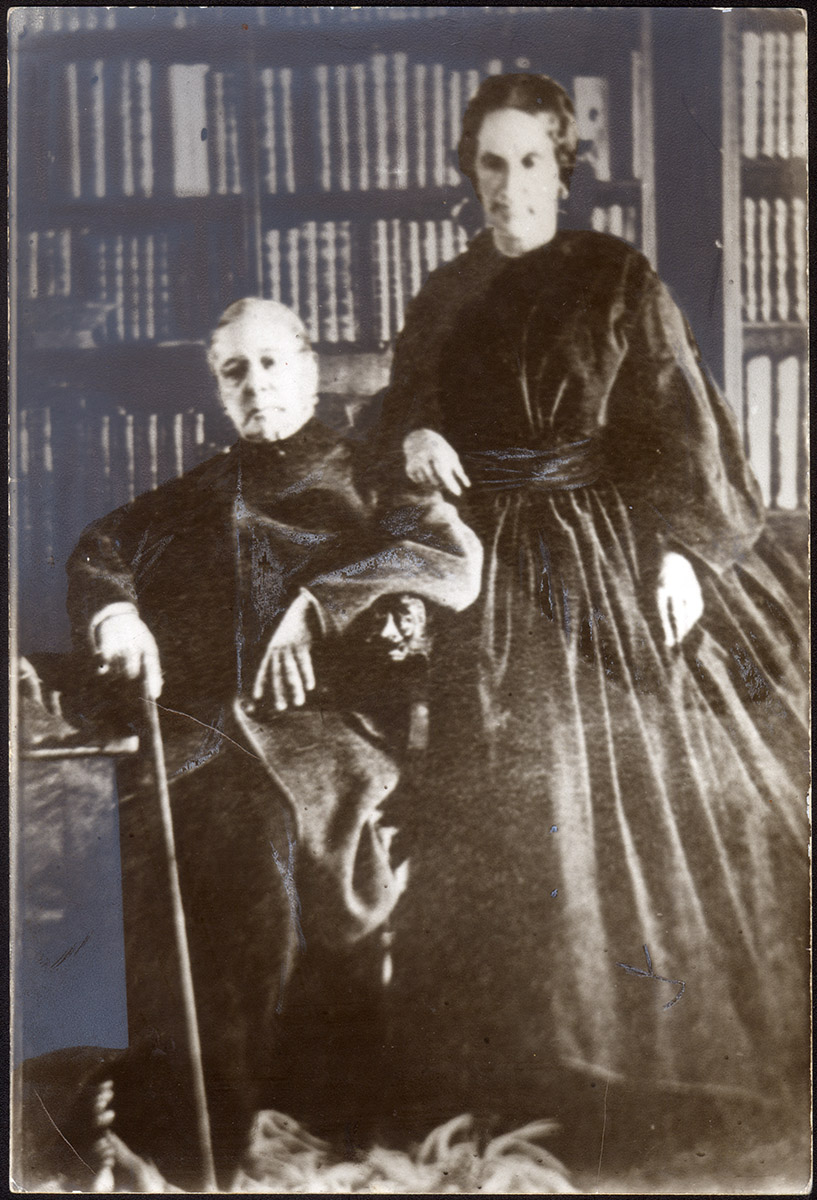
Andrés Bello and his wife Isabel Dunn in 1862

In 1829 he accepted a post in the Chilean Ministry of Foreign Affairs in Santiago, Chile under the administration of Chilean minister Diego Portales. While a surprising candidate considering his Venezuelan birth, he gladly accepted the post and was later named Senator of Santiago. As Senator, Bello founded the University of Chile in 1843 and held a position as Rector for the remainder of his life. Until his death at the age of eighty-three, Bello worked tirelessly to train the young minds of the new republic. Such brilliant thinkers and writers as José Victorino Lastarria and Francisco Bilbao were influenced by their time with Bello.

The Gramática de la lengua castellana destinada al uso de los americanos, or Castilian Grammar Intended for the Use by Americans (Americans referring to Castilian- or Spanish-speaking inhabitants of the Americas), finished in 1847, was the first Spanish-American Grammar, with many original contributions, a product of long years of study. Republished over the years with many revisions, the most significant of which are by Rufino José Cuervo, this is still a valuable reference work. Bello was accepted in the Royal Spanish Academy as Correspondent Member in 1861.

== Works ==
=== Prose ===
- Complete works from Santiago, Chile
  - I. Philosophy of the Understanding.
  - II. Poem of the Cid
  - III. Poetry
  - IV. Grammar of the Castilian Language
  - V. Grammatical Tracts
  - VI. Literary and Critical Booklets
  - VII. Literary and Critical Booklets
  - VIII. Literary and Critical Booklets
  - IX. Legal Brochures
  - X. International Law
  - XI. Project of Civil Code
  - XII. Draft Civil Code
  - XIII. Unpublished Project of Civil Code
  - XIV. Scientific Booklets
  - XV. Miscellaneous
- Complete works from Caracas, Venezuela
  - I. Poetry
  - II. Drafts of Poetry
  - III. Philosophy of Understanding and Other Philosophical Writings
  - IV. Grammar of the Castilian Language Destined to the Use of the Americans
  - XVIII. Legal and Social Issues
  - XIX. Texts and Government Messages
  - XX. Labor in the Senate of Chile (Speeches and Writings)
  - XXIII. Topics of History and Geography
  - XXIV. Cosmography and Other Writings of Scientific Divulgation
  - XXV. Epistolario
  - XXVI. Epistolario

=== Poems ===
- El romance a un samán [English: The Romance of a Samán (Caracas)]
- A un Artista [English: To an Artist (Caracas)]
- Oda al Anauco [English: Ode to Anauco, 1800]
- Oda a la vacuna [English: Ode to the Vaccine, 1804]
- Tirsis habitador del Tajo umbra [English: Tirsis Inhabitant of the Shady Tagus, 1805]
- Los sonnets a la victoria de Bailén [English: The Sonnets to the Victory of Bailén, 1808]
- A la nave (imitation de Horacio) [English: To the Ship (Imitation of Horace), 1808]
- Alocución a la Poesía, Londres [English: Speech to Poetry (London), 1823]
- El incendio de la Compañía (canto elegíaco), Santiago de Chile, Imprenta del Estado [English: The Fire of the Company (Elegiac Song) Santiago, Chile, 1841]
- La agricultura de la zona tórrida (in Las Cien Mejores Poesías de la Lengua Castellana) [English: The agriculture of the torrid zone (in The Hundred Best Poems in the Castilian Language)] (Note: Dr. Francisco Antonio Rísquez quoted part of this poem in his address to the first Pan-American Medical Congress in 1893.)

== Accomplishments ==
One of Bello's most famous accomplishments was his promulgation of the 1852 Civil Code of Chile, passed by Chilean Congress in 1855. It served primarily as a governing code similar to Europe's Napoleonic Code. He worked on this Code for twenty years, and it was later adopted by both Colombia and Ecuador.

== Memorials ==
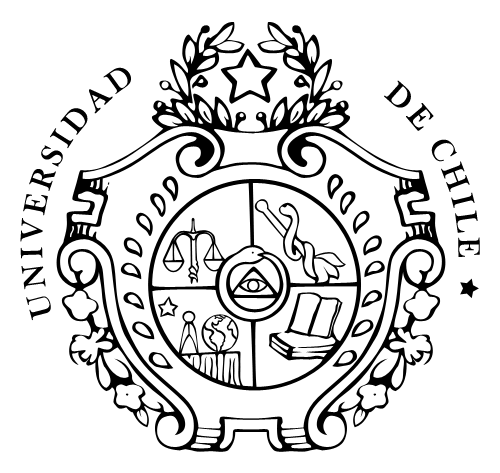
- Universidad de Chile
  Bello is also revered by the María Lionza cult of Venezuela.
- In 1953 the Andrés Bello Catholic University (Universidad Católica Andrés Bello) was founded and named in his honour.
- Chile's Andrés Bello Diplomatic Academy (Academia Diplomática de Chile Andrés Bello) was named after Bello.

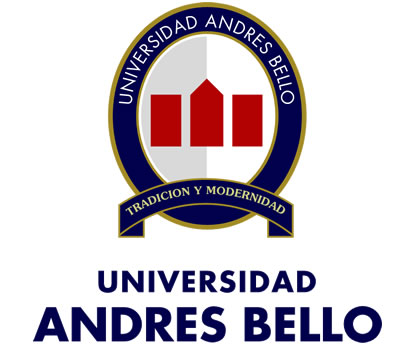
Andrés Bello National University

- A raised bust was erected in Bello's honour at St Antony's College, Oxford, with an inscription that reads: 'Poet, Jurist, Philosopher, Philologist, Educator: Born Caracas 1781. Died Santiago de Chile 1865. From 1810 to 1829 he served the cause of South American Independence'.
- Bello is featured on the old 2,000 Venezuelan bolívar and the 20,000 Chilean peso notes. There is also a decoration, the Venezuelan Order of Andrés Bello.
- In 1981, for the commemoration of the bicentennial of his birth, Bello's name was used in the naming of the asteroid 2282 Andrés Bello.
- In 1988, Andrés Bello National University, a private university in Chile, adopted his name.
- In 2001, the Andrés Bello Chair in Latin American Cultures and Civilizations was established at New York University’s King Juan Carlos I of Spain Center.
- In 2008, the University of Chile created "Public Bello" magazine, named in honour of Bello, covering popular themes about society.
- In 2014, a column in The Economist covering Latin America was named "Bello" in his honour.
- A building on the Rinconada de los Poetas in Mexico City is named Andrés Bello.

== Descendants ==
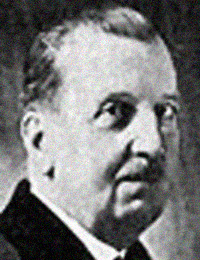
Emilio Bello Codesido, Chilean diplomat, deputy and President of the government junta (1868–1963)

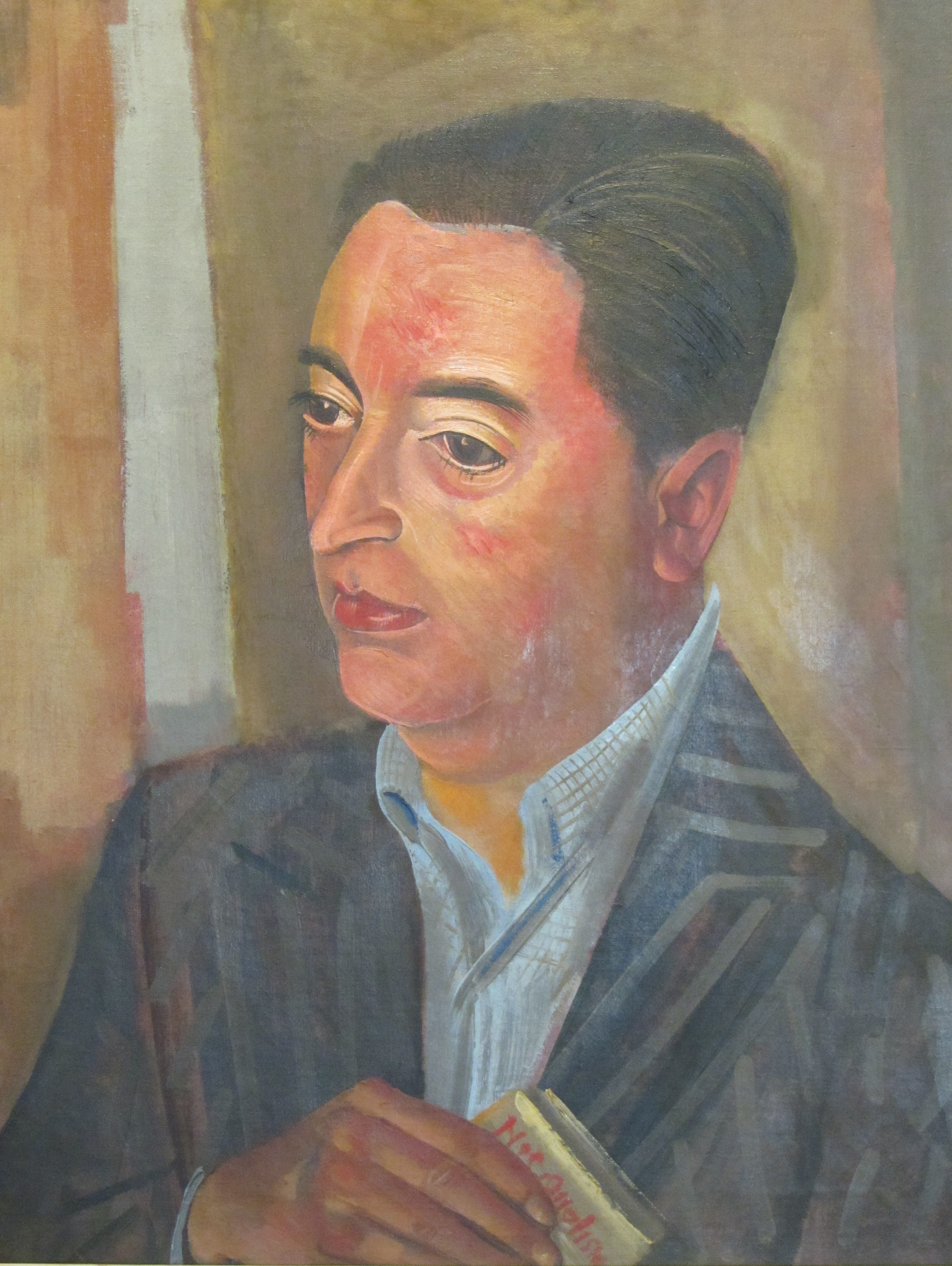
Joaquín Edwards Bello, Chilean writer (1887–1968)

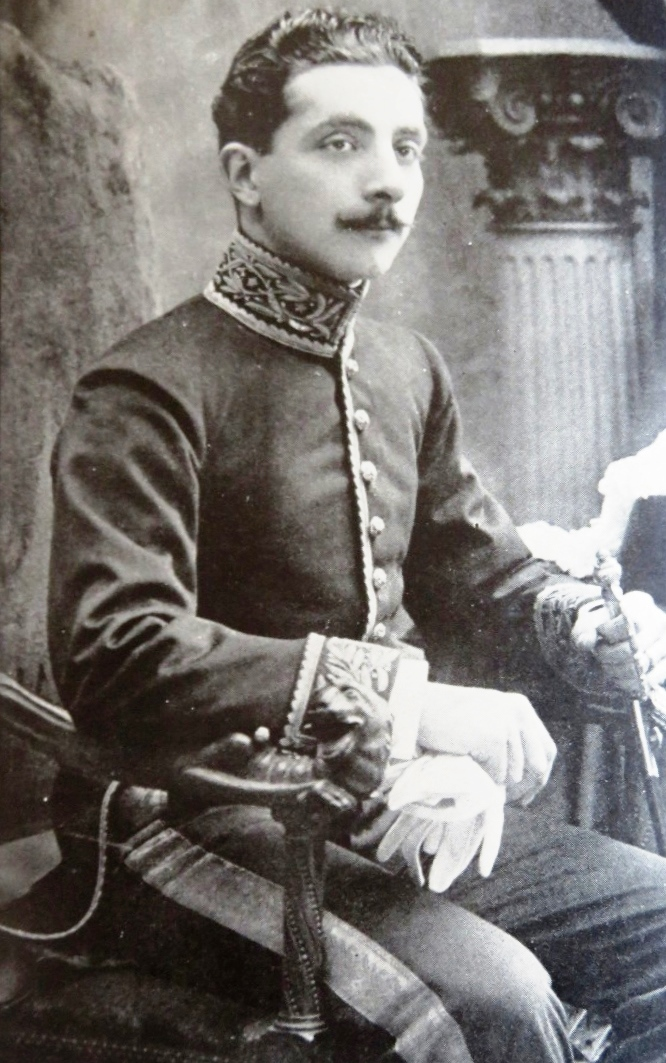
Ernesto Balmaceda Bello, Chilean diplomat (1887–1906)

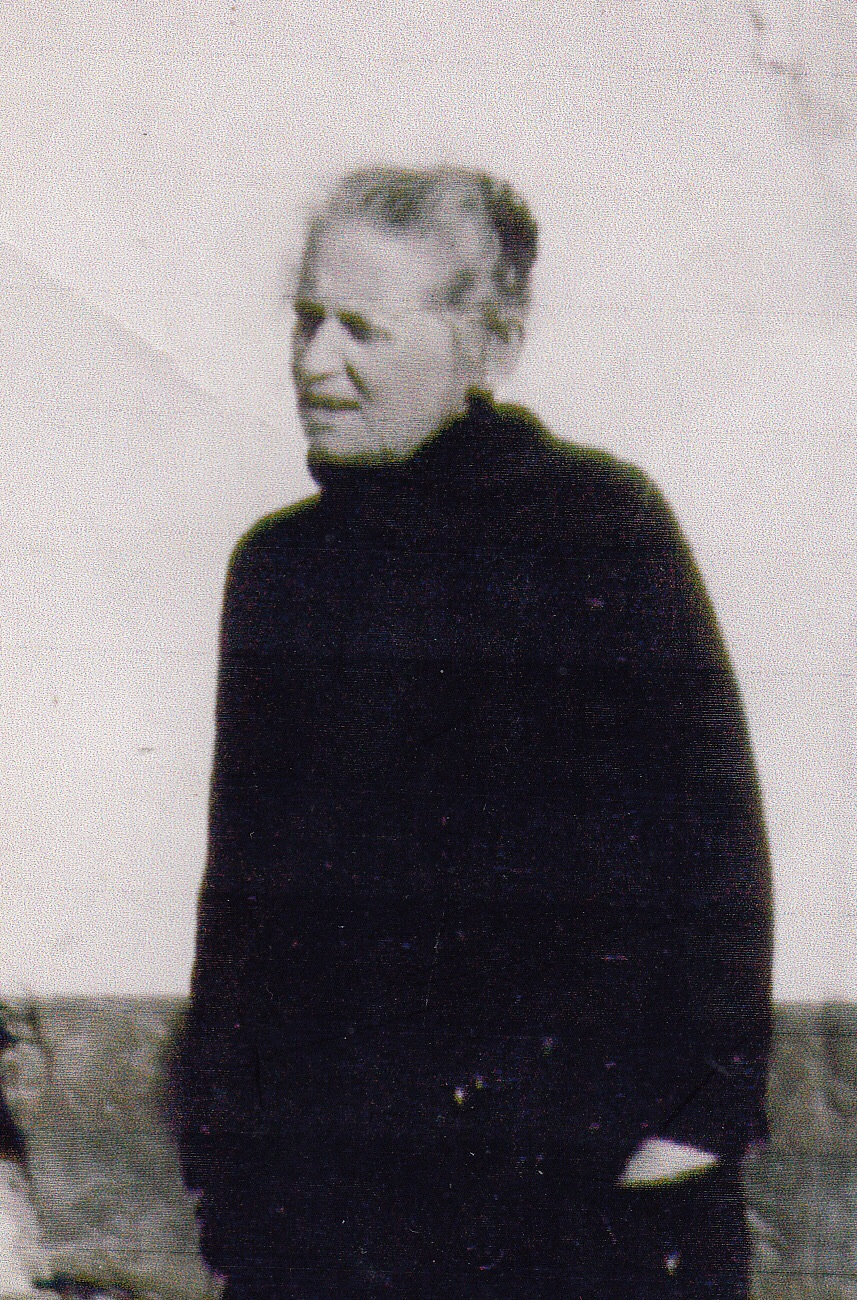
Clarisa Bello Guzmán, granddaughter

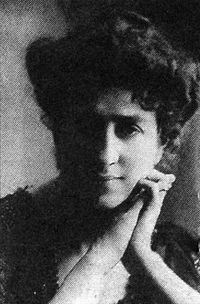
Inés Echeverría Bello Chilean writer (1868–1949)

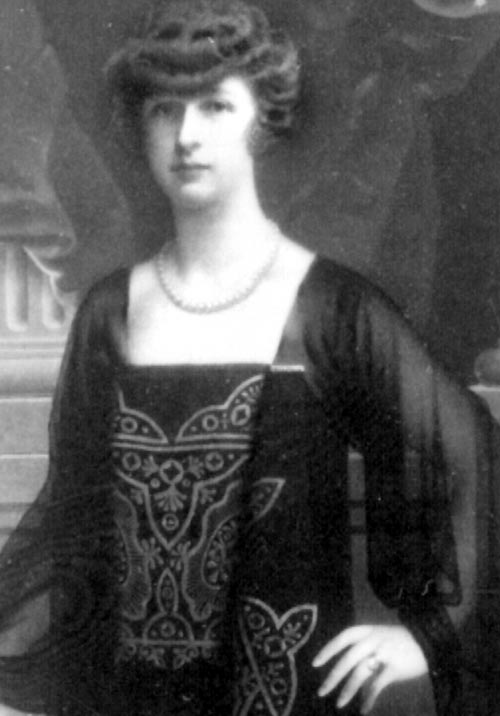
Rebeca Matte Bello Chilean sculptor (1875–1929)

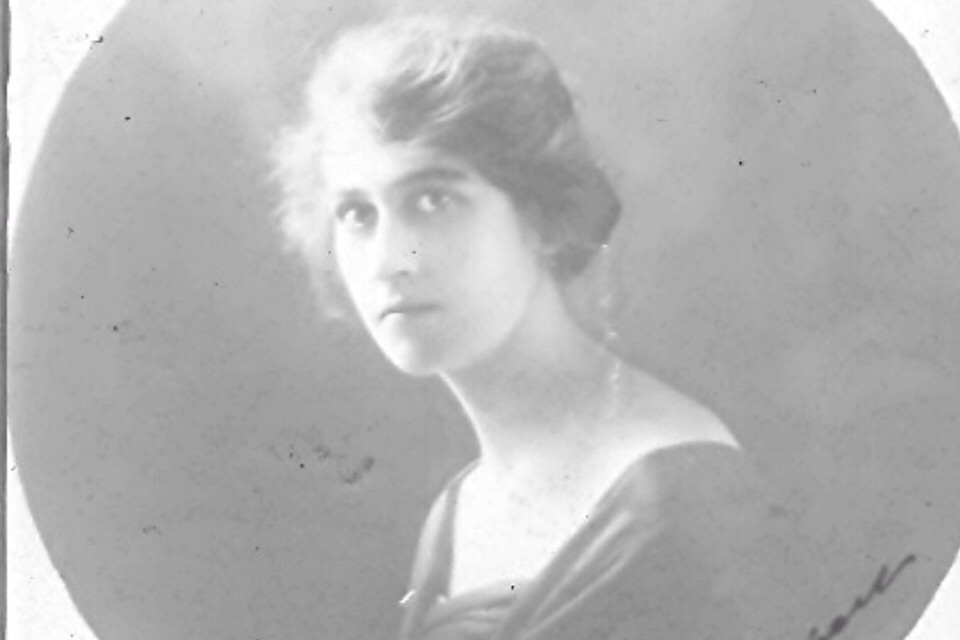
María Emilia Vargas Bello (1896–1978), great-granddaughter

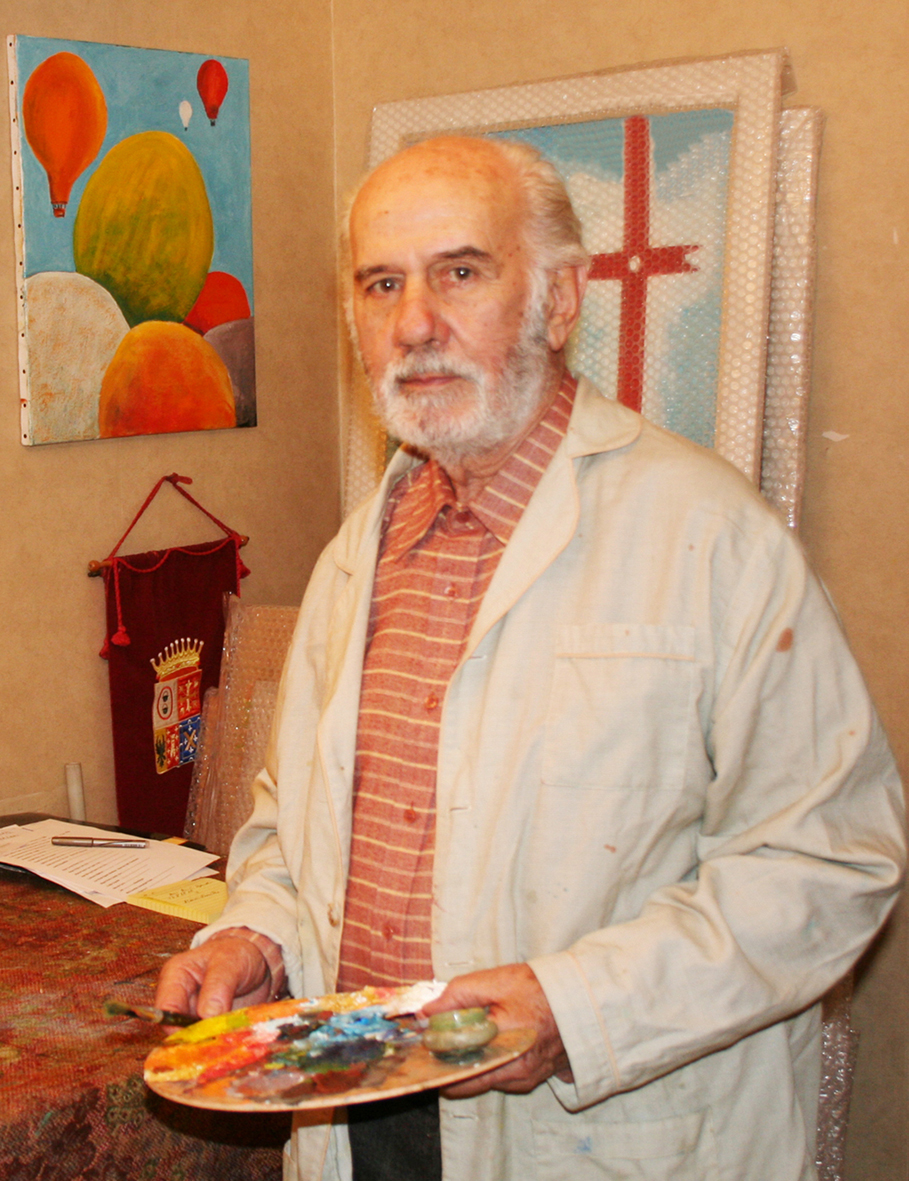
Eugenio Cruz Vargas, Chilean painter and poet (1923–2014)

== Notes ==
Academic offices
Preceded by None	Rector of the Universidad de Chile; 1843-1865	Succeeded by Manuel Antonio Tocornal
