= Agioi Apostoli =

Agioi Apostoloi Άγιοι Απόστολοι
- Settlement
- Location within Greece
- Coordinates: 35°30.5′N 23°58.6′E
- Country: Greece
- Administrative region: Crete
- Regional unit: Chania
- Municipality: Chania
- Municipal unit: Nea Kydonia
- Time zone: UTC+2 (EET)
  - Summer (DST): UTC+3 (EEST)

Agioi Apostoloi is a waterfront village, named after a small church called Agioi Apostoloi ("Saint Apostles"), situated in Crete and it is famous for its coves. Found only 4 km from the centre of Chania on the island of Crete, it is known for its small protected woods, for a summer beach volleyball competition, and as a favourite beach for winter swimmers. Agioi Apostoloi is located between the city of Chania to the east, and the summer resorts of Agia Marina and Platanias to the west.

Many inhabitants of Chania visit the sandy beaches during the weekends because they are close to the city, they have sport facilities and in the end they are quite warm even from the first weeks of the summer.

There are three different beaches in Agioi Apostoloi, each one situated in its own small bay.

The most well-known beach in the village is called Chrissi Akti ("Golden Beach"), due to the gold colour of the sand. The second of Agioi Apostoli's beaches is a horseshoe shaped sandy cove which is popular with swimmers. The beach is 500 metres long and 50 metres wide and can be accessed via wooden boards and ramps. The beach has received a Blue Flag award. The third beach is the smallest beach in this Municipality at 300 metres long and 20 metres wide. The beach is approached by wooden boards and ramps and again has Blue Flag status.

The village of Agioi Apostoloi is also known for its sardine feast. During the feast, many locals and tourists gather here to freely taste the grilled sardines, drink raki or tsikoudia, and listen to traditional Cretan music.

The waterfront of the Agioi Apostoloi (the park included) is under preservation by the authorities, therefore there is still some green space next to the sea. The local flora consists of many Pine, Nerium oleander, Palmaes and Eucalyptus trees. Sea Daffodil, a rare and protected species with large, delicate, white flowers and a strong scent, also grows in the area.

Environmental educational projects take place throughout the year, particularly regarding the Loggerhead sea turtles that use the coastline to breed.

In the past few years there has been discussion in the local community about whether Agii Apostoli should be protected from any kind of tourist development.

== Gallery ==
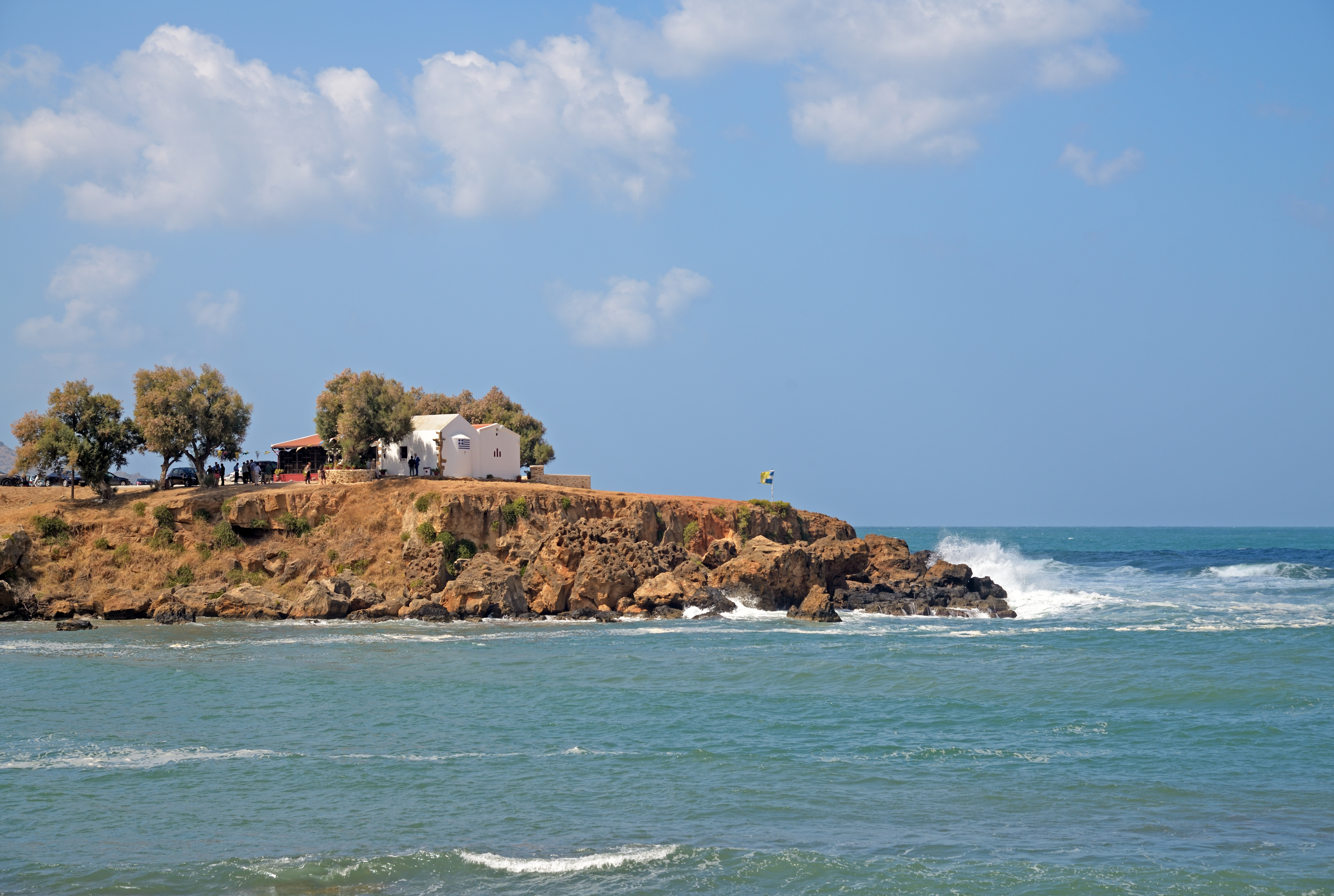
Church St Apostoli

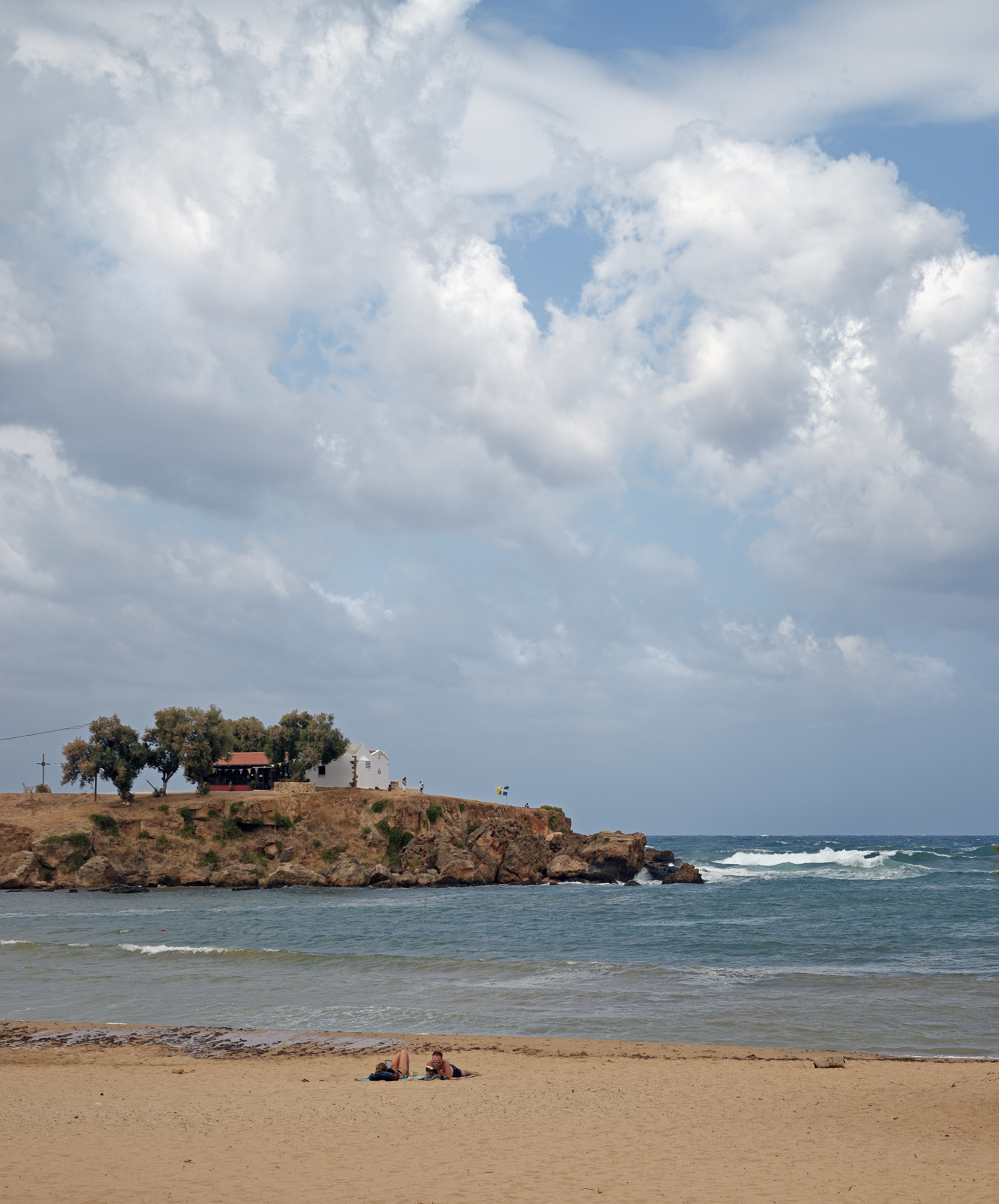
Iguana Beach

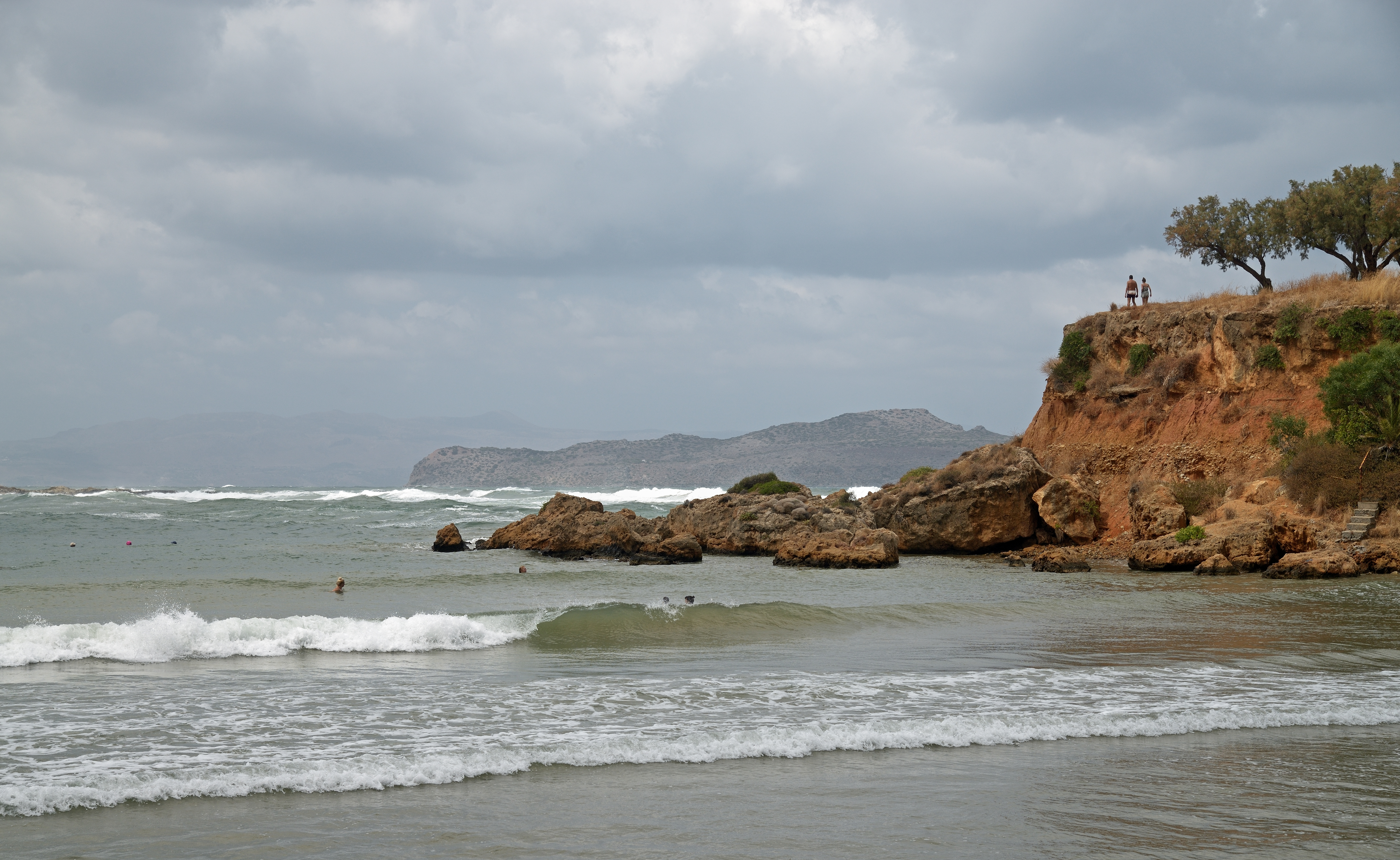
Coast in Agioi apostoli

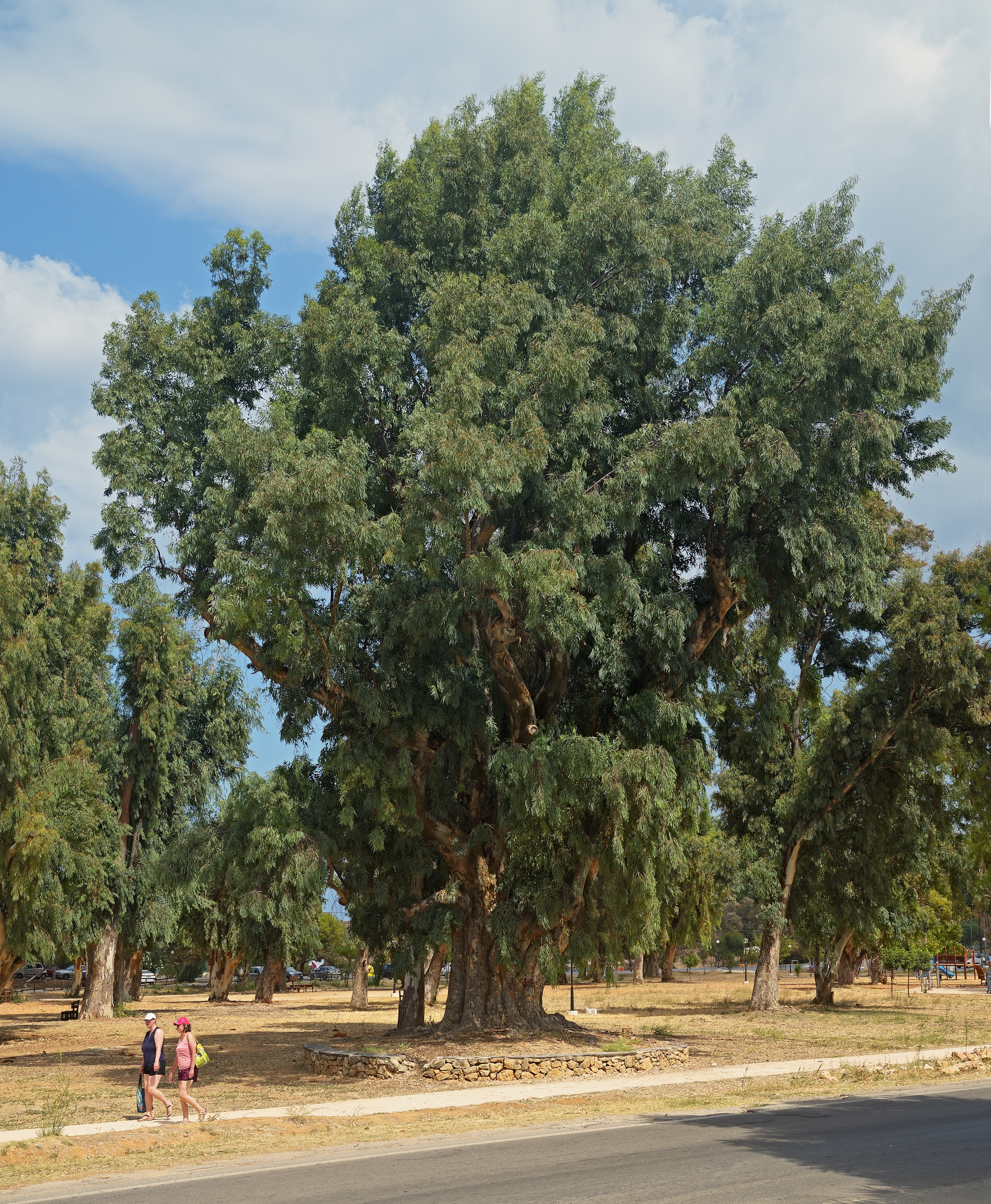
Eucalyptus trees
