= Anales de la Universidad de Chile =

- Discipline: Arts, humanities, science
- Language: Spanish
- Edited by: Jennifer Abate Cruces

Publication details
- History: 1843-present
- Publisher: University of Chile (Chile)
- Frequency: Biannual

Standard abbreviations
- ISO 4: An. Univ. Chile

Indexing
- CODEN: AUCHA3
- ISSN: 0365-7779 (print); 0717-8883 (web)
- LCCN: 55037211
- OCLC no.: 889512243

Links
- Journal homepage; Online access; Online archive

Anales de la Universidad de Chile is a biannual peer-reviewed academic journal containing research and critical reflections on arts, humanities, and science. It was established in 1843 and is published by the University of Chile. The editor-in-chief is Jennifer Abate Cruces (University of Chile).
