= Monument to Simón Bolívar (Madrid) =

Simón Bolívar
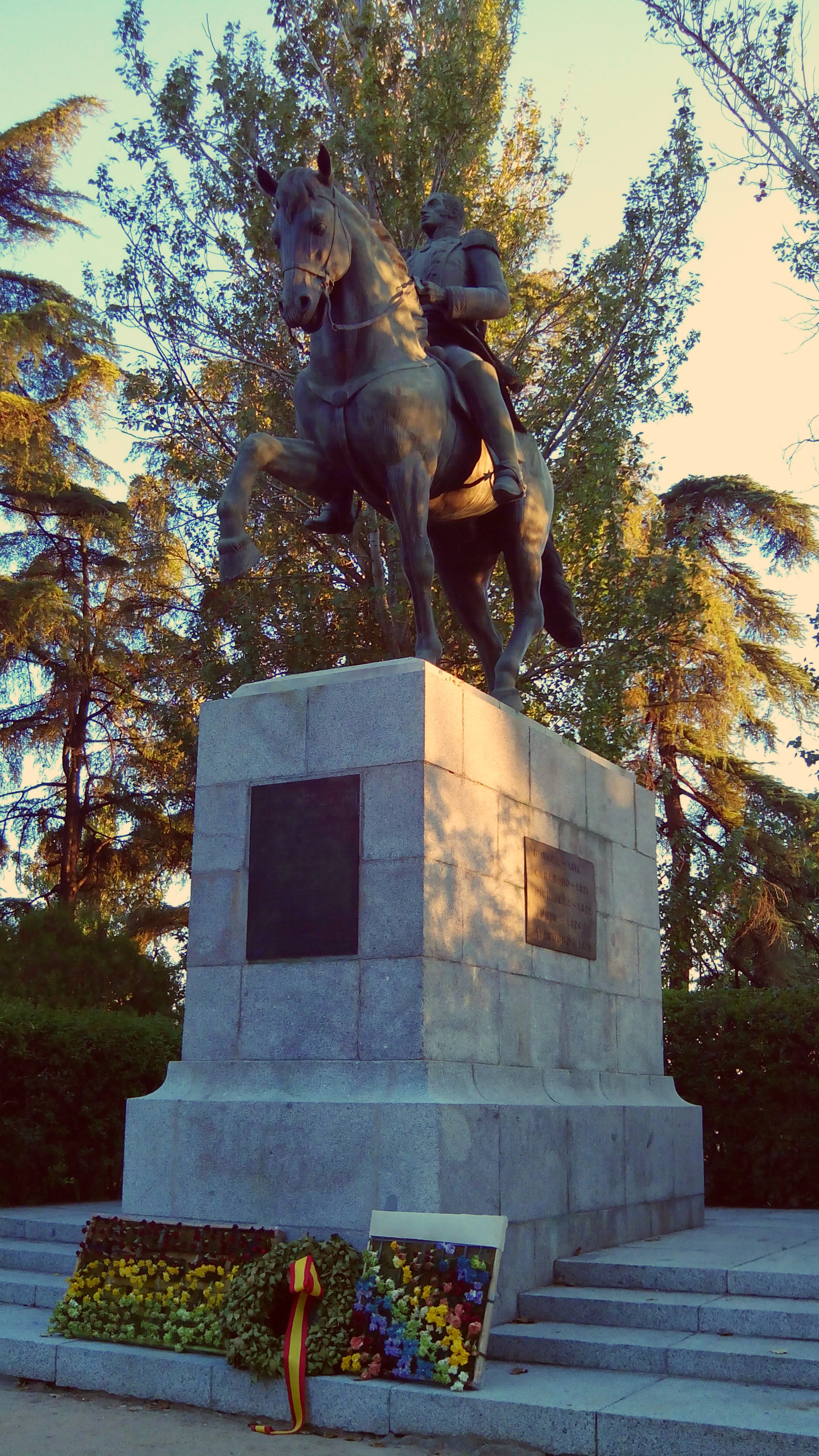
- Location: Parque del Oeste, Madrid, Spain
- Coordinates: 40.432152°N 3.727785°W
- Designer: Emilio Laíz Campos
- Material: Bronze, stone
- Length: 3.90 m
- Width: 1.90 m
- Height: 7.50 m
- Opening date: 28 October 1970
- Dedicated to: Simón Bolívar

Simón Bolívar or the Monument to Simón Bolívar is an instance of public art located in Madrid, Spain. Dedicated to Simón Bolívar "el Libertador", key figure in the emancipation of several Latin American nations, it consists of a bronze equestrian statue put on a stone pedestal.

== History and description ==
It is the successful attempt of a series of previously failed initiatives intending to erect a monument dedicated to Bolívar in Madrid, tracing back in time to 1922, including a mammoth 100-metre high discarded project by Juan de Ávalos.

Carlos Arias Navarro, Antonio Aparisi Mocholí and Luis Sánchez Agesta decisively gave thrust to the idea in the 1960s and the project was finally entrusted to Spanish sculptor Emilio Laíz Campos. The monument was funded by the Bolivarian nations.

The bronze composition depicts Bolívar riding his horse while raising his right arm, meanwhile the horse raises its front right leg. The equine figure was modelled after a horse owned by Ángel Peralta Pineda. Laíz cast additional replicas of the statue to send to Colombia and Venezuela. The statue is placed on a plinth made of white stone from Colmenar de Oreja and a granite basement, making a total height of 7.50 m.

Placed since 1968 in the Parque del Oeste and inaugurated on 28 October 1970, it was soon moved to a new location in the park, and in the process three new plaques were added to the pedestal, the front one reading "Simón Bolívar — Libertador — de Venezuela — Colombia — Panamá — Ecuador — Perú — Bolivia — 1783-1830".
