= Dequeísmo =

Phenomenon in Spanish grammar relating to complementizer use

Dequeísmo is a phenomenon in Spanish grammar, considered "wrong" in prescriptive works. It is the practice of using de que instead of que as the complementizer introducing a verbal complement clause. It can be seen as the opposite of queísmo, which involves using que when de que is to be used.

For example, Me dijo de que estaba cansado ("He told me that he was tired"), is a case of dequeísmo since the prescriptive construction is Me dijo que estaba cansado. Dequeísmo is considered peculiar to less educated speakers, most likely as an instance of hypercorrection in the attempt to avoid queísmo or perhaps a conflation with the reflexive use, which can sometimes be quite superficially similar:

Me alegro de que seáis felices. (Grammatically normal, with a reflexive verb: "I am pleased...")
Me alegra de que seáis felices. (Prescriptively incorrect, non-reflexive dequeísmo, usually Me alegra que seáis felices. "It pleases me...")
