= Judith Klavans =

American computer scientist

Judith L. Klavans
- Born: November 7, 1946 (age 80); Washington, D.C., United States
- Occupations: Computer scientist, linguist, computational linguist University of Maryland, College Park; Columbia University in the City of New York TJ Watson Research, IBM Corporation
- Website: Judith L. Klavans

Judith L. Klavans (pronounced /ˈkleɪvənz/ KLAY-vənz) is a linguist and computer scientist. She has been active in academia, industry and government in furthering the development and application of computational approaches to the study of language, with publications in areas including speech synthesis, machine translation, the development of resources and corpus analysis, internet addiction, information retrieval, and automatic summarization. Her technologies have been applied in fields ranging from medical informatics, cybersecurity, database interoperability, cultural heritage institutions and Digital Government.

== Academic background ==
Klavans completed her doctoral dissertation in 1980 at University College London of the University of London in the Department of Linguistics. Her dissertation was selected in the Outstanding Dissertations in Linguistics series for updating and publication

== Experience ==
Klavans spent nine years serving at IBM Thomas J. Watson Research Center, in Yorktown Heights, New York as a research scientist and member of Technical Staff in the Computer Science Department. She then went to Columbia University in the City of New York as the founding Director of the Center for Research on Information Access, and co-director of the Digital Government Research Center. After leaving Columbia, she led the Text, Tags and Trust group at the University of Maryland Institute for Advanced Computer Studies.

== Public service ==
Klavans was appointed by the White House to serve on the President's Information Technology Advisory Board (PITAC), a bi-partisan science advisory board. PITAC was authorized by Congress under the High-Performance Computing Act of 1991 (P. L. 102-194) and the Next Generation Internet Act of 1998 (P. L. 105-305) as a Federal Advisory Committee. During this tenure (2003-2005), Klavans participated in three major scientific studies: Report to the President on Revolutionizing Health Care Through Information Technology (June 2004); Report to the President on Cyber Security: A Crisis of Prioritization (February 2005); Report to the President on Computational Science: Ensuring America's Competitiveness (June 2005). Klavans has been invited to contribute to studies by the National Academies of Science on the role of maps in emergency response; her role in this effort was to focus on the linguistic requirements of response management.

== Government service ==
From 2005 to 2013, Klavans was Director of Human Language Technology program at the Foreign Language Program Office of the Office of the Director of National Intelligence (ODNI) or DNI.

== Advocacy for technical women and minorities ==
Klavans has been heavily involved with increasing the representation of women in Science, Technology, Engineering, and Mathematics (STEM) fields. She was active in the CRA-W (The Computing Research Association's Committee on the Status of Women in Computing Research) and served as local New York City representative. Klavans is a founding member of the Anita Borg Institute for Women and Technology reflecting her long-standing commitment to increasing the number of women and minorities in technical professions. Klavans was also a close personal friend of Anita Borg through the revolutionary Systers group, founded by Borg in 1987. Early planning meetings for both the Grace Hopper Conference and the Institute were held at Klavans’ mother's home in Kalorama, Washington, D.C. from 1992–1994.

== Additional biographical information ==
Klavans was born in Washington, D.C. in 1946. After completing a B.A. at Oberlin College, she completed a first master's degree at Boston University in Linguistics and Teaching English to Speakers of Other Languages (TESOL). From 1970 to 1971, she lived on the Oglala Sioux Indian Reservation in Wounded Knee, South Dakota, where she worked on a literacy program for college bound high school students. Klavans comes from a family of musicians and artists. In addition to her career as a scientist and academic, Klavans is known for her musical talents. She is an accomplished flutist, and has performed as a soprano with several well-known choirs.

== Books ==
- Klavans, Judith L. and Philip Resnik, eds. (1997). The Balancing Act: Combining Symbolic and Statistical Approaches to Language. MIT Press: Cambridge, Massachusetts.
- Klavans, Judith L. (1994). Clitics and Cliticization: The Interaction of Morphology, Phonology and Syntax. Outstanding Dissertations in Linguistics Series. Garland Press: New York, New York.

== Patents ==
- 8,176,418

System and method for document collection, grouping and summarization

- 7,254,530

System and method of generating dictionary entries

- 6,473,730

Method and system for topical segmentation, segment significance and segment function

- 5,630,121

Archiving and retrieving multimedia objects using structured indexes
