= Alemañol =

Mixed language of Spanish and German

Alemañol (a portmanteau formed of Spanish words alemán and español) is a mixed language, spoken by Spanish-speakers in German regions, which formed with German and Spanish. It appeared in the 1960s and it is used today by Spaniards, South Americans, and other Latin Americans in German regions. In the same way, it is also spoken by descendants of German settlers in South America, mostly in the Southern Cone. Alemañol is also spoken by South American residents of German descent in native German-speaking countries.

Alemañol is considered a hybrid language by linguists. Many actually refer to Alemañol as "Spanish-German code-switching," but some influence of borrowing and lexical and grammatical shifts occur as well.

== Examples ==
=== Words ===
- der Bahnhof - el Bahnhof - la bánjof (Station)
- der Keller - el Keller - la quela (Basement)
- die U-Bahn - la U-Bahn - el uvan (Metro)

=== Verbs ===
Verb anmeldear (alemañol)
Person	Number	Alemañol	German	English
First person	singular	Yo me anmeldeo	Ich melde mich an	I register
Second person	singular	Tú te anmeldeas	Du meldest dich an	You register
Third person	singular	Él se anmeldea	Er meldet sich an	He registers
Third person	singular	Ella se anmeldea	Sie meldet sich an	She registers
First person	plural	Nosotros nos anmeldeamos	Wir melden uns an	We register
Second person	plural	Vosotros os anmeldeais	Ihr meldet euch an	You register
Third person	plural	Ellos se anmeldean	Sie melden sich an	They register

== Expressions ==
- no hay que mischear los espraje = man soll die Sprachen nicht vermischen = Languages should not be mixed
- es muy mühsam para mi = es ist äußerst mühsam für mich = This is extremely difficult for me
- puedo tener tu móvil ? = kann ich dein Handy haben ? - me das tu móvil? = Can I have your phone ?
- me tienes un lápiz = hast du einen Bleistift ? - me das un lápiz ? = Do you have a pencil ?

== Bibliography ==
- Yolanda Mateos Ortega: Esto me suena a 'alemañol'. 2000, Frecuencia L. Revista de didáctica del español como segunda lengua.
- V. Canicio: Espalemán o alemañol? En: Lebende Sprachen: Zeitschrift für fremde Sprachen in Wissenschaft und Praxis. Fachblatt des Bundesverbandes der Dolmetscher und Übersetzer.
