= Queísmo =

Queísmo is a phenomenon in Spanish grammar, the omission of a preposition, usually de, which, in Standard Spanish, would precede the conjunction (or complementizer) que. For example, "No me di cuenta que habías venido" ("I didn't realize you had come"), compared to the standard "No me di cuenta de que habías venido". Queísmo is frowned upon by prescriptive grammar.

Although the omitted preposition is typically de, other prepositions occasionally are also subject to omission by queísmo: "Insisto que te vayas" ("I insist that you go"); compare standard "Insisto en que te vayas".

Queísmo may be, in some cases, a hypercorrective reaction to dequeísmo: the insertion of de before que where it would not appear in standard Spanish, which is considered a much more serious and socially stigmatized mistake, but which is nevertheless widespread in both Peninsular and American Spanish.
