= Clitic climbing =

Grammatical feature in Romance Languages

Clitic climbing is a phenomenon first identified in Romance languages in which a pronominal object of an embedded infinitive appears attached to the matrix verb. Pronominal objects in Romance languages are typically expressed as clitics. The following Italian example illustrates the phenomenon. The object pronoun, lo, a clitic, is attached to the infinitive in the embedded or subordinate clause in (1a). In (1b), the clitic has "climbed" to the main or matrix clause and is attached to the matrix verb. There is no discernible difference in meaning between the two forms.

Gianni vuole comprar=lo.
Gianni wants to.buy=it
"Gianni wants to buy it."

Gianni lo=vuole comprare.
Gianni it=wants to.buy
"Gianni wants to buy it."

Clitic climbing is found in almost all Romance languages. It is notably absent in French.
