= Lucius Aurelius Orestes (consul 126 BC) =

Roman consul in 126 BC and governor of Sardinia

Lucius Aurelius Orestes was a Roman politician who served as consul of the Roman Republic in 126 BC with Marcus Aemilius Lepidus. He had served as praetor some time before 129 BC. After his consulship, he was assigned as proconsul in Sardinia, with Marcus Aemilius Scaurus and Gaius Gracchus as his subordinates. His command in Sardinia was prorogued in 124 BC, which his quaestor and lieutenant Gaius Gracchus responded to by deserting for home to stand for plebeian tribune. After winning victory over the natives, he triumphed in 122 BC.

== Bibliography ==
- Badian, Ernst (1983). "The Silence of Norbanus". The American Journal of Philology. 104 (2): 160. doi:10.2307/294289. ISSN 0002-9475. JSTOR 294289.
- Broughton, TRS (1951). Magistrates of the Roman Republic. Vol. 1. American Philological Association.
- Broughton, Thomas Robert Shannon (1952). The magistrates of the Roman republic. Vol. 2. New York: American Philological Association.

Preceded by Lucius Cassius Longinus Ravilla and Lucius Cornelius Cinna	Consul of the Roman Republic; 126 BC; With: Marcus Aemilius Lepidus	Succeeded by Marcus Plautius Hypsaeus and Marcus Fulvius Flaccus
