= Cato Maior de Senectute =

Essay written by Cicero in 44 BC

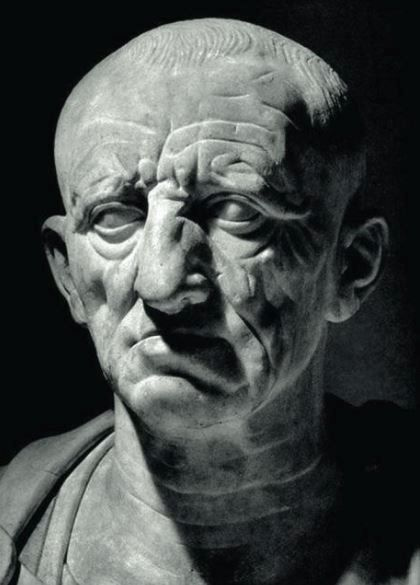
Bust of a patrician from the Roman Republic

Cato Maior de Senectute ("Cato the Elder on Old Age") is an essay written by Cicero in 44 BC on the subject of aging and death. To lend his reflections greater import, Cicero wrote his essay such that the esteemed Cato the Elder was lecturing to Scipio Aemilianus and Gaius Laelius Sapiens.

== Title ==
The original title of the work was Cato Maior. Its subtitle was De senectute, but this came to be preferred as a short title by later writers. Cicero himself refers to the work in his other writings generally as Cato Maior and once as Cato Maior qui est scriptus ad te de senectute. Possibly he calls it Cato in one instance. Plutarch, translating De senectute, calls it Περὶ γήρως (Peri geros) in Greek. Most manuscript copies of the text use the full title or some variant of it (e.g., Catonis de senectute).

== Synopsis ==
It was written by Cicero in his sixty-third year, and is addressed to his friend Atticus. Cicero represents the discourse as delivered by the elder Cato (in his eighty-fourth year) on occasion of young Scipio and Laelius expressing their admiration at the wonderful ease with which he still bore the load of life. Cicero acknowledges that the sentiments put into the mouth of Cato are really Cicero's own. His purpose is to show that old age is not only tolerable, but comfortable by internal resources of happiness. He examines the infirmities of old age under four general headings:—that it incapacitates from mingling in the affairs of the world—that it produces infirmities of body—that it stops the enjoyment of sensual gratifications—and that it brings us to the verge of death. Some of these supposed disadvantages, he maintains, are imaginary, and for any real pleasures of which the old are deprived, others more refined and higher may be substituted. Overall the view of old age is optimistic. He denies, for instance, that the memory is impaired—that no old man ever forgot where he had concealed his treasure. The whole work is illustrated by examples of eminent Roman citizens who had passed a respected and agreeable old age.

== Legacy ==
A translation by the colonial American scholar James Logan was published by Benjamin Franklin, the first printing of a translation of a classic text in North America. It was a favorite of former U.S. President John Adams, and was selected for inclusion in the Harvard Classics.

== Quotes ==
- The works of Nature must all be accounted good. (Latin: Omnia autem quae secundum naturam fiunt sunt habenda in bonis) (71)
- No man is so old that he does not think himself able to live another year (Latin: nemo enim est tam senex qui se annum non putet posse vivere) (24)

== Editions ==
- Cicero, On Old Age, On Friendship, On Divination (Loeb Classical Library No. 154), ISBN 0-674-99170-2
- Cicero, Philip Freeman (tr.) How to Grow Old: Ancient Wisdom for the Second Half of Life (Princeton University Press, 2016), ISBN 9780691167701
