= Gnaeus Servilius Caepio (consul 141 BC) =

Roman politician who was consul in 141 and censor in 125 BC

Gnaeus Servilius Caepio (born c. 184 BC) was a Roman politician who was consul in 141 BC; his colleague was Quintus Pompeius. He was the elder brother of one of his immediate successors in the consulship, Quintus Servilius Caepio, and the homonymous son of the consul of 169 BC.

During his consulship, he was "placed in charge of the investigation of [Lucius] Hostilius Tubulus [one of the praetors for 142 BC] by the senate", who had become "a byword for accepting bribes while presiding over the quaestio de sicariis". Tubulus was put on trial by Publius Mucius Scaevola who served as tribune of the plebs that year, resulting in Tubulus' departure into exile. It is unclear what province Gnaeus Caepio received after his consulship; it is possible he was defeated in Macedonia, but more likely stayed in Italy.

Some time around 138 BC, he joined his brother and some of the Caecilii Metelli in prosecuting his former consular colleague Pompeius for extortion. He, and his brother, were active lawyers in this period, as noted by Cicero. Münzer writes in the Realencyclopädie (1942) that Caepio, with a Quintus Metellus, suppressed a slave revolt at Minturnae and Sinuessa as part of an extraordinary command late in 133 BC; Broughton, however, in Magistrates of the Roman Republic (1952) notes no such command.

He was elected to the censorship of 125 BC with Lucius Cassius Longinus Ravilla. During their term, they constructed the Aqua Tepula.

Preceded by Lucius Caecilius Metellus Calvus and Quintus Fabius Maximus Servilianus	Consul of the Roman Republic; 141 BC; With: Quintus Pompeius	Succeeded by Gaius Laelius Sapiens and Quintus Servilius Caepio
Preceded by Quintus Caecilius Metellus Macedonicus and Quintus Pompeius (131 BC)	Roman censor 125 BC; With: Lucius Cassius Longinus Ravilla	Succeeded by Quintus Caecilius Metellus Balearicus and Lucius Calpurnius Piso Frugi (120 BC)
