= Dative construction =

Grammatical way of constructing a sentence

The dative construction is a grammatical way of constructing a sentence using the dative case. A sentence is also said to be in dative construction if the subject and the object (direct or indirect) can switch their places for a given verb, without altering the verb's structure (subject becoming the new object, and the object becoming the new subject). The latter case is not to be confused with the passive voice, where only the direct object of a sentence becomes the subject of the passive-voiced sentence, and the verb's structure also changes to convey the meaning of the passive voice. The dative construction tends to occur when the verb indicates a state rather than an action.

== Examples ==
=== Persian ===
There has not been extensive research on dative construction in Persian, but they can be easily found:

مرا دندان نیست (marā dandān nīst) ("I have no teeth", but literally "To me is not teeth") - Common in classical Persian.
در ما این واژه نیست (dar mā īn vāže nīst) ("We don't have this word", but literally "In us is not this word") - In Afghan and Tajik dialects.

=== German ===
In German, the dative construction sometimes occurs with the verb sein ("to be"). Compare:

Ich bin kalt ("I am cold")
Mir ist (es) kalt (literally "To me is (it) cold")

The first example implies that the speaker has a cold personality. The subject here (ich, "I") is in the nominative case. The second construction is used when one wants to say "I am (feeling) cold" in German. While in English the subject of the sentence "I am cold" is "I", in German the subject of the sentence "Mir ist kalt" is the implied dummy pronoun es ("it"-NOMINATIVE NEUTER), and mir ("me"-DATIVE) is the indirect object. The use of the nominative form equivalent to "I" is only possible with a different meaning: "Ich bin kalt"='I am cold (in personality)'. "Mir" behaves like a subject and can control infinitives:

"Mir war (es) zu kalt um zur Kirche zu gehen"
me.DAT was (it.N.NOM) too cold for {to the.F.D.SG} church.DAT to go.INF
'I was too cold to go to church' ("I" go, not "cold")

=== Icelandic ===
Dative constructions are extremely common in Icelandic. Their use is similar to that of German, although perhaps somewhat more widespread. The following example is exactly the same as the German one given above:

Ég er kaldur ("I am cold")
Mér er kalt (literally means, "cold is to me")

The implication of the first example is the same as in German, that the speaker has a cold personality rather than feeling physically cold. Dative constructions appear in many fixed expressions such as this, such as mér er alveg sama ("I don't care", lit. "to me it's completely the same"), henni er annt um umhverfið ("she cares about the environment", lit. "to her is dear about the environment") and þú getur fengið nýjan síma þér að kostnaðarlausu ("you can get a new phone free of charge", lit. "you can get a new phone to you at no cost").

Passive constructions in Icelandic also require the subject to be in the dative if the verb in question governs the dative, e.g., tímaáætluninni var breytt ("the timetable was changed"), skjölunum var eytt ("the documents were deleted") and framkvæmdum var frestað um tvær vikur ("works were delayed by two weeks"). Compare to passive constructions where the verb governs the accusative: búðin var opnuð á föstudaginn ("the shop was opened on Friday") and bréfið var sent fyrir hádegi ("the letter was sent before noon"). Verbs that govern the genitive behave in the same way as verbs governing the dative, e.g. þín verður saknað ("you will be missed").

Finally, certain verbs require the subject to be in the dative. This is particularly common with verbs of emotion or opinion. For example:

Mér finnst hann góður kennari. ("I think he's a good teacher", lit. "to me [it] finds [that] he [is] a good teacher")
Önnu þykir erfitt að hætta. ("Anna finds it hard to stop", lit. "to Anna [it] seems difficult to stop")

This phenomenon is not only restricted to the dative case, some verbs require their subject to be in the accusative:

Krakkana langar í ís. ("The kids want ice cream")

In all of the above instances, the verbs used in these constructions are in the third-person singular form.

=== Hindustani ===
Dative constructions are common in Hindustani. It always makes use of a pronoun or noun in the dative case which acts as the subject and the copula verb 'होना' /ɦonɑ/ (to be) in the 3rd person conjugations. Dative construction in Hindi has no restrictions on type of verb that can be used with it. Hence any verb in any grammatical aspect, mood, or tense of Hindi can be used in the dative construction. The following are some examples showing dative construction:

उन्हें {लकड़ी को} {कुल्हाड़ी से} {मेरे लिए} काटना है।
unʱẽ ləkɽi-ko kulɦɑɽi-se meɾe-liye kɑʈnɑ ɦɛː
they:DAT wood:ACC axe:INST {for me:DAT} cut:INF be:3SG:PRS
"They have/want to cut the wood for me with the axe."

तुझे ठंड {लग रही} थी।
tujʱe ʈʱənɖ {ləg ɾəɦi} tʱiː
you:DAT cold:NOM feel:PROG:FEM:SG be:3SG:IPFV:FEM
"You were feeling cold."

मुझे सोना था।
mujʱe sonɑ tʱɑ
me:DAT sleep:INF be:3SG:IPFV:MASC
"I had/wanted to sleep"

उसे अपने परिवारवाले पसंद हैं।
use əpne pəɾɪvɑɾʋɑle pəsənd hɛ̃ː
he/she:DAT self:REFL.PL family-members:NOM like be:3PL:PRS
"She likes her family."

मुझे {लड़की से} प्रॉब्लॅम है।
mujʱe ləɽki-se pɾɔblɜm hɛː
me:DAT girl:INST problem:NOM be:3SG:PRS
"I have a problem with the girl."

उसे दाँत नहीं हैं।
use dɑ̃t nəɦĩ hɛ̃ː
he/she:DAT teeth:NOM not be:3PL:PRS
"He doesn't have teeth."

Passive forms construction in Hindi can make use of both the nominative and the dative case as subjects without any change of meaning. When the subject is nominative the nuance is such that the focus is only on the receiver (subject) being on the receiving end of the action, and when dative pronoun is used the nuance is such that the focus is on the doer that did the action to the receiver (even though the doer might not be present in the sentence). It is the nuance that decides which grammatical case noun/pronoun to use, the meaning/translation of both are the same. However, the verb agreement pattern in both constructions are different. When the dative case is used, the verb shows agreement in gender and number with the direct object (or, takes the default masculine when no object is present), but when the subject is in the nominative case, the verb shows agreement with the nominative subject of the sentence, also, the copula agrees with the nominative subject in its conjugation and it cannot be restricted to the third person. An example showing the equivalency of the usage of dative and nominative pronouns in the passive construction is below:

उसे मारा गया था।
use mɑɾɑ gəyɑ tʱɑ
he/she:DAT kill:PTCP gone:PTCP:MASC:SG be:3SG:IPFV:MASC
"He/She was killed."

वो मारा गया था।
ʋo mɑɾɑ gəyɑ tʱɑ
he/she:NOM kill:PTCP:MASC:SG gone:PTCP:MASC:SG be:3SG:IPFV:MASC
"He was killed."

वो मारी गयी थी।
ʋo mɑɾi gəyi tʱi
he/she:NOM kill:PTCP:FEM:SG gone:PTCP:FEM:SG be:3SG:IPFV:FEM
"She was killed."

Notes:

1. गया (gəyɑ) & गयी (gəyi) are the singular masculine and feminine forms of the perfective participle of the light-verb जाना (jɑnɑ) [to go] which is used for passive voice construction.
2. मारा (mɑɾɑ) is the perfective participle of the verb मारना (mɑɾnɑ) [to kill].

=== Spanish ===
A number of verbs in Spanish employ a dative construction. Many of these verbs express psychological states; the most common one is gustar, which is equivalent to English like (but syntactically functions like be pleasant to). The verb agrees with the formal/morphological subject, but the subject is usually placed after the verb instead of before, as usual. The dative construction requires a clitic pronoun; if the dative argument is a full noun phrase or needs to be explicitly stated, it is shown by a phrase with the preposition a.

Me gusta el verano. ("I like the summer")
A mí me gusta más la primavera. ("[As for me,] I like the spring better")
A Juan le gustan las rubias. ("Juan likes blondes")
A ella le gustas. ("She likes you")

Other verbs which show this pattern are apasionar ("to be passionate about"), antojarse ("to have a feeling for"), encantar ("to adore"), faltar ("to be lacking"), quedar ("to be remaining") and sobrar ("to be in excess").

=== Serbo-Croatian ===
In Serbo-Croatian (as in other Slavic languages), the dative construction is often used, mostly in the same manner as in German:

Hladan sam.
cold.ADJ-MASC.NOM.SG be-1SG
literally "I am cold", meaning "I am a cold person".

Hladno mi je.
cold-ADV 1st-DAT.SG be-3SG
literally "It is cold to me", meaning "I am (feeling) cold".

Some verbs, like nedostajati ("lack") use dative constructions:

Nedostaju mu zubi.
lack-3PL he-DAT.SG Teeth-NOM.PL
literally "Teeth to him lack".

=== Georgian dative construction ===
The dative construction is very common in Georgian. The dative construction of Georgian differs somewhat from German, in that the dative case agrees with a certain person marking on the verb. The dative construction occurs in the perfect (not perfective) tense of transitive verbs and in all the tenses of some verbs, such as "to want", "to have", "to forget" and "to remember". These verbs are also called "indirect verbs" by some generativists. Compare:

Bavshvebi tsqals svamen ("children are drinking water") imperfective aspect-present tense, NOM-DAT
Bavshvebs tsqali dauleviat ("children have drunk water") perfect aspect-present tense, DAT-NOM
Bavshevebma tsqali da-li-es ("children drank water") perfective aspect-past (aorist) tense, ERG-NOM

In Georgian, the -s suffix is the dative case marker. In the first sentence, bavshvebi ("children") is the subject and in the nominative case. Tsqals ("water") is the object and in the dative case (with the suffix -s attached). In the second sentence, however, the subject (children) is in the dative case (with -s), and the object (water) is in the nominative case. The verb in the imperfective and perfective sentences are conjugated in accordance with the subject of the sentence (regardless of the case of the subject); they are both third person plural. Perfect verbs also agree in part with their dative case subjects (in this case the -u- between da- and -leviat), but only have third person verb endings (singular form for all singular persons and ALSO first person plural; plural form for 2nd/3rd person plural). Therefore, "I have drunk water" would be:

(me) damilevia (-a is singular, -at is plural)

The dative construction is also a separate class of verbs (Class IV) which have the semantics of experience, cognitive processes, and possession (all common DAT-construction predicates in languages which have them). An example of this can be given with the possessive verb kona ("to have"):

Kals tsigni akvs ("The woman has a book")
Kals tsigni hkonda ("The woman had a book")
Kals tsigni hkonia ("The woman has had a book")

In all the tenses, the subject kals ("woman") is in the dative case, and the object tsigni ("book") is in the nominative case. Etymologically, the root is also found in the future forms of the copula 'be', making it very much like the Latin dative possession construction 'mihi est X'. Again, all singular persons have an agreeing proclitic pronoun on the verb, but a third person singular verb ending (-a or -s).

(me) tsigni makvs ("I have a book")

=== Finnish ===
The genitive case is used in dative constructions. The "dative genitive" (datiivigenetiivi) is no longer productive in Finnish language, and it is often replaced with other cases, except in frozen expressions, e.g. luojan kiitos (thanks to god).

Minä olen kylmä. = I am cold (cold personality).
Minun on kylmä. = "To me is cold."

More often in modern language: Minulla on kylmä. = "At me is cold."

The dative genitive is often used with verb infinitives.

Minun pitää tehdä se. = "To me has to do it." = I have to do it.
Minun tekee mieli syödä makeisia. = "To me makes mind to eat candies..." = I'd like to eat candies.
Minun tekee pahaa ajatellakin sitä. = "To me makes bad to even think about it." = I feel bad just thinking it.

=== Latin ===
Latin uses a dative construction for indirect objects (dativus possessivus).

Mihi est liber. = "To me is book." = I have a book.

=== Hungarian ===
Hungarian uses a similar construction to Latin for rendering possession without the verb to have which is missing from Hungarian.

== See also ==
- Quirky subject
