= Aqua Tepula =

Ancient Roman aqueduct

Coordinates: 41.888976°N 12.453132°E

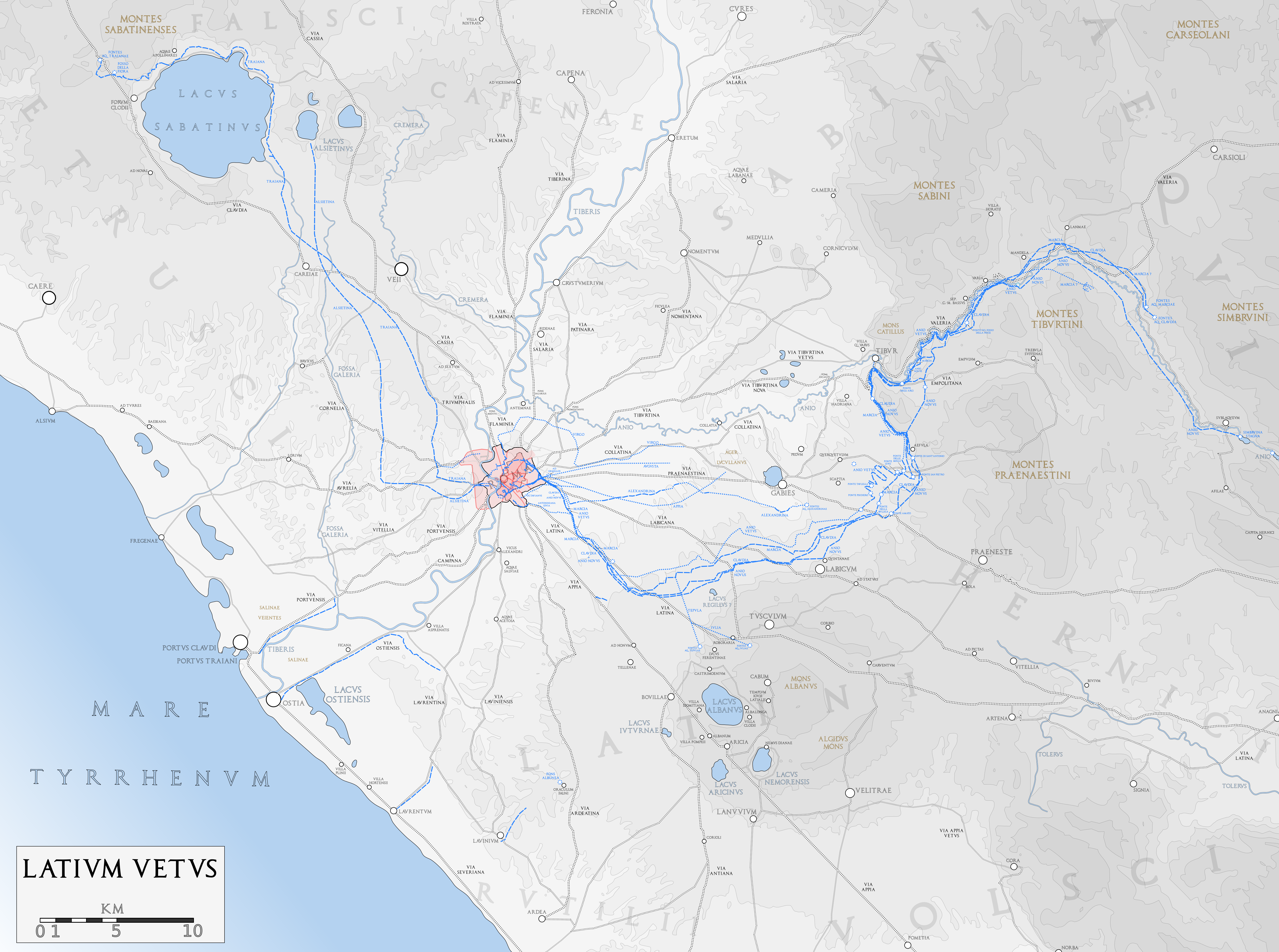
Route of aqueduct

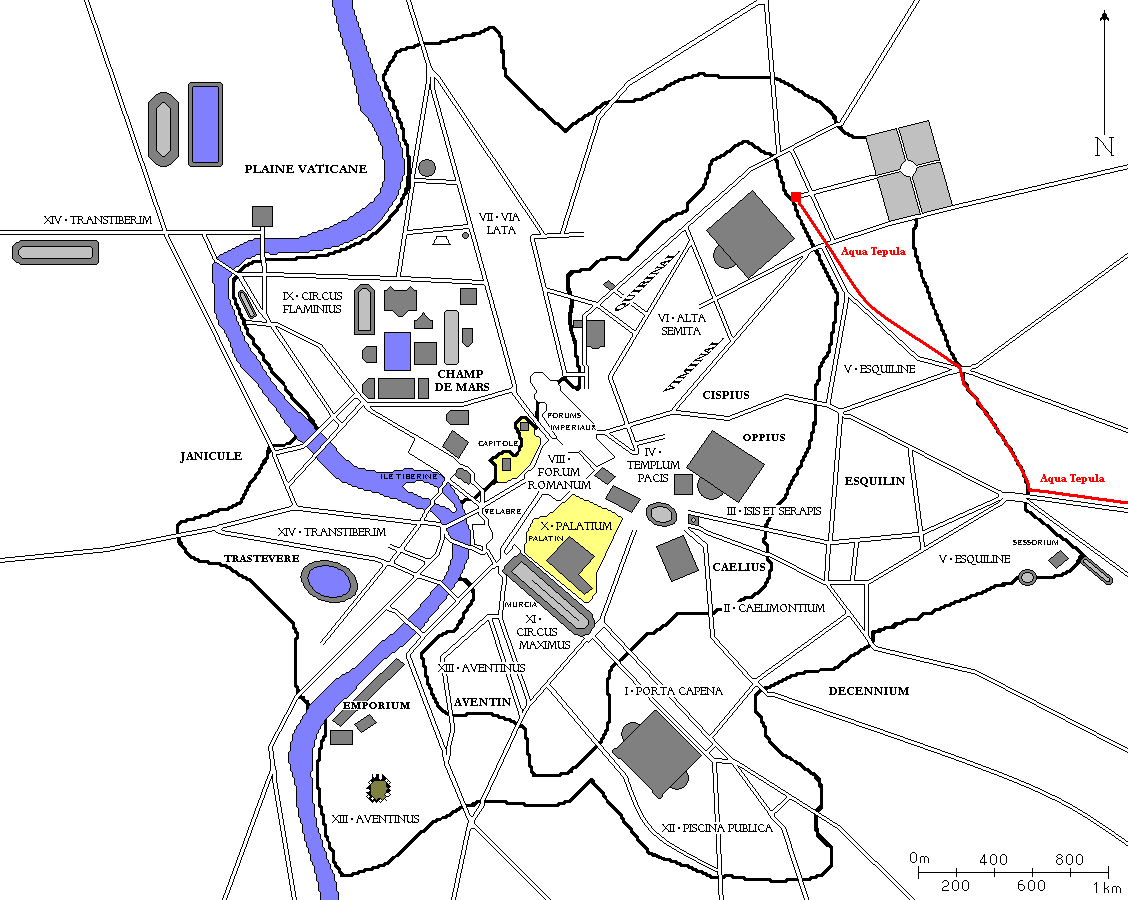
Map of Rome with Aqua Tepula (red)

The Aqua Tepula is an ancient Roman aqueduct completed in 125 BC by censors Gnaeus Servilius Caepio and Lucius Cassius Longinus Ravilla. The water the aqueduct carried was tepid, and probably thus unpalatable. It is not known how much water the original aqueduct carried, but the amount conducted to the city was smaller than that of the Aqua Marcia. After a (major) reconstruction by Agrippa in 33 BC the aqueduct delivered to the city daily 400 quinariae -- 17,800 m^{3} (4,700,000 US gal).

== History ==
After its initial construction, the Aqua Tepula was not maintained or repaired for almost a century. The first, and extensive, repairs took place in 33 BC when the aqueduct was restored, and probably rebuilt for the most part, by Agrippa. During these restoration works an additional source was added to the aqueduct while the first few miles of the original conduit were abandoned, and water from both sources of Tepula added to those of Aqua Julia.

Between 11 and 4 BC Aqua Tepula was again restored, this time by Augustus, and archaeological remains of local repair works show that the aqueduct was subjected to (at least) local repairs) between 41 and 54 AD, during the reign of Claudius. Though there are a few remains of later repairs, these can't be dated reliablly.

== Route ==
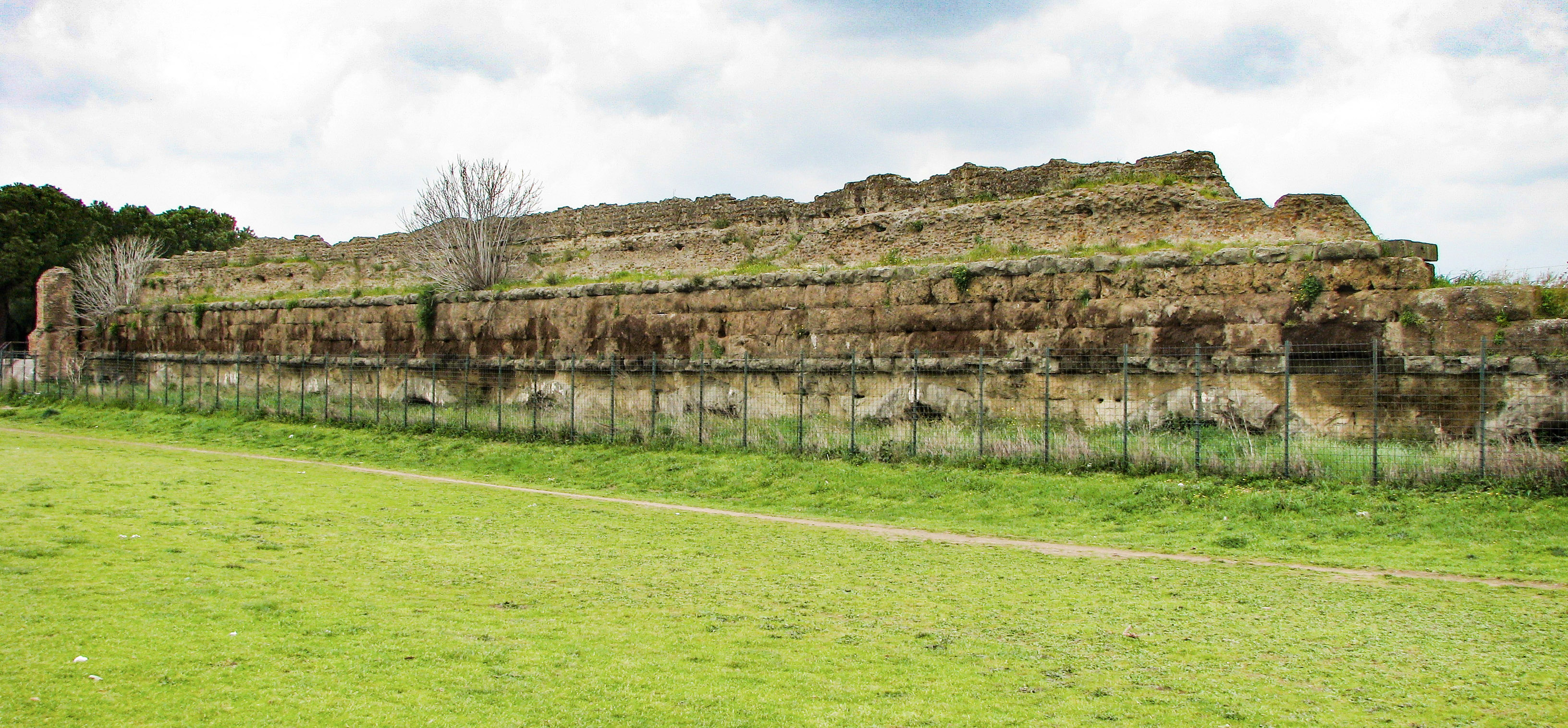
The stone arches and channel of the Aqua Marcia (140 BC), with the brick Aqua Julia (33 BC) and minor brick remains of the Aqua Tepula (125 BC) on top, near Romavecchia, Via Lemonia

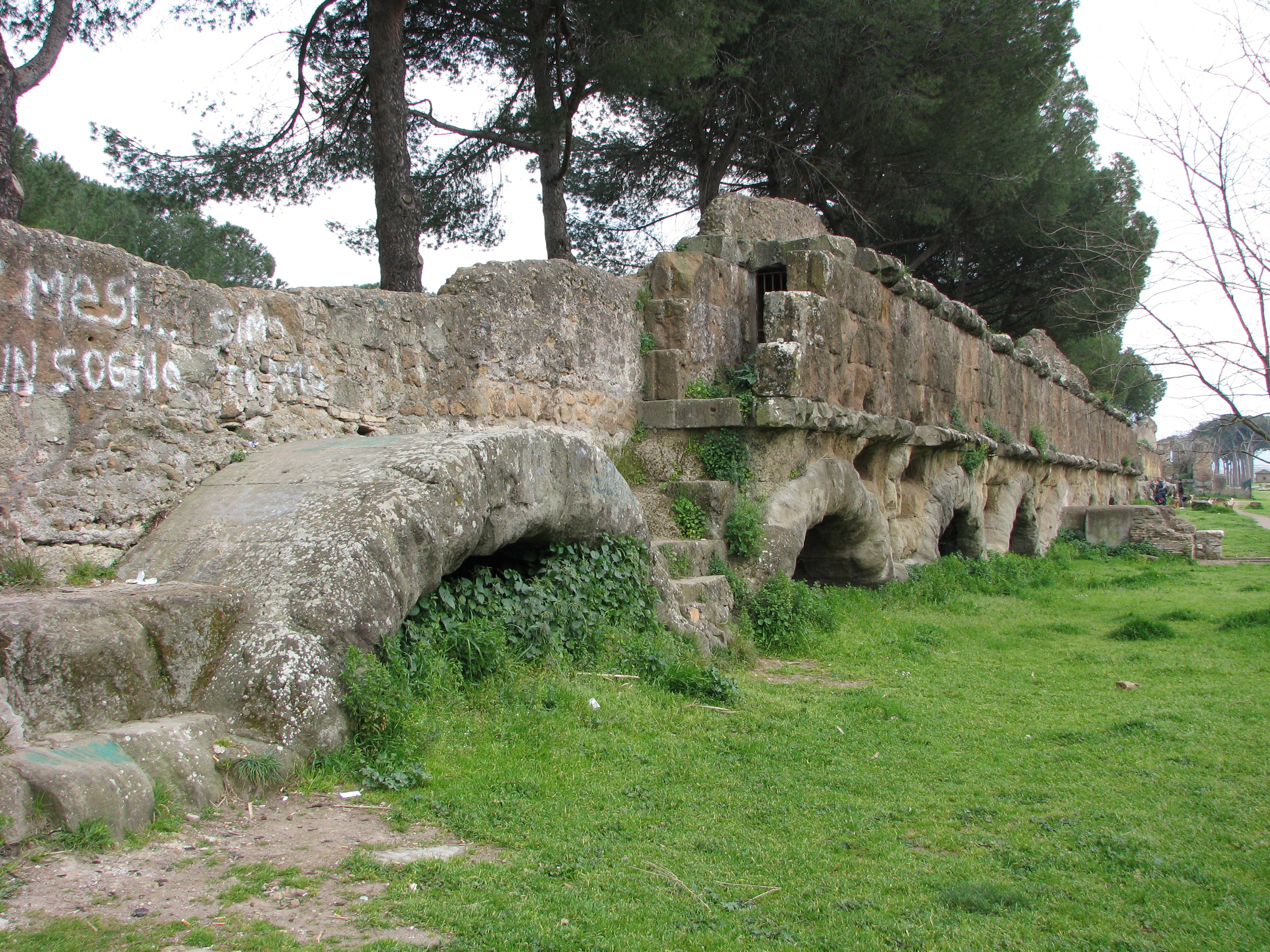

Its source was at the volcanic area of the Alban hills on the estate of Lucullus, between today's municipalities of Grottaferrata and Marino, a mere 18 km from Rome.

Until the Augustan era the aqueduct flowed along an underground route from source to terminus.

In 33 BC, Agrippa modified the aqueduct concurrently with the construction of the Aqua Julia and added 92 quinariae of water flow from the Julia. The conduit was made to join the newly built one for Julia until it reached the current locality of Capannelle near the Aqua Marcia where there was a limaria pool (settling basin) and by which time the water had cooled.

The water was then split again (for an unexplained reason) into two conduits for the Tepula and the Julia, the Tepula being the highest, superimposed on arches of the Marcia, for the remaining 10 km. They reached the city at ad spem veterem, near Porta Maggiore.

From here on the conduit used the Aurelian Walls and crossed Via Tiburtina on an arch which became Porta Tiburtina. The route passed the Viminal gate, where Termini Station stands today, and ended near the Porta Collina, where the main distribution castellum was, near the current Via XX Settembre. It passed through 14 castella delivering water to four regions.

Later another 163 quinariae of water, derived from the future Anio Novus aqueduct (built around 50 AD), were added at the horti Epaphroditiani on the Esquiline hill for a final overall total, upon distribution, of 445 (190+92+163) quinariae (18,467 m^{3}, about 200 litres per second), still a scant amount in Roman times.

== See also ==
- Ancient Roman technology
- List of aqueducts in the city of Rome
- List of aqueducts in the Roman Empire
- List of Roman aqueducts by date
- Parco degli Acquedotti
- Roman engineering
