= Cherchez la femme =

French phrase

Cherchez la femme (French: [ʃɛʁʃe la fam]) is a French phrase which literally means 'look for the woman'. It is a cliché in detective fiction, used to suggest that a mystery can be resolved by identifying a femme fatale or female love interest. The phrase embodies a cliché of detective pulp fiction: no matter what the problem, a woman is often the root cause. Thus, it has come to refer to explanations that automatically find the same root cause, no matter the specifics of the problem.

== Origin of the phrase ==
The expression comes from the novel The Mohicans of Paris (Les Mohicans de Paris) published 1854–1859 by Alexandre Dumas (père). The phrase is repeated several times in the novel; the first use reads:

Cherchez la femme, pardieu! cherchez la femme!

[Look for the woman, by God! Look for the woman!]

Dumas also used the phrase in his 1864 theatrical adaptation:

Il y a une femme dans toutes les affaires; aussitôt qu'on me fait un rapport, je dis: « Cherchez la femme ! »

[There is a woman in every case; as soon as someone brings me a report, I say, "Look for the woman!"]

== See also ==
- Cui bono
- "Follow the money"
