= Aqua Julia =

Ancient Roman aqueduct

Coordinates: 41°53′49″N 12°30′39″E

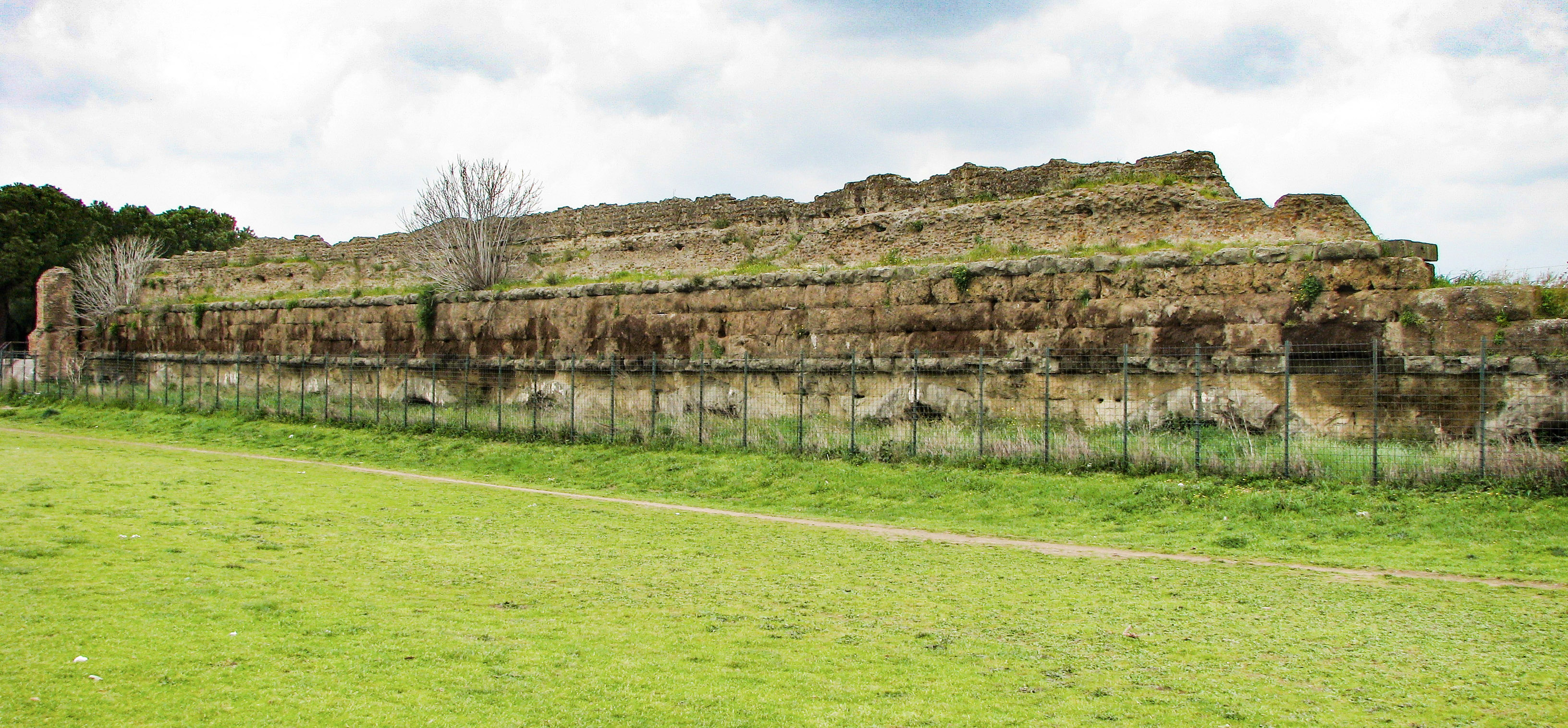
The stone arches and channel of the Aqua Marcia (140 BC), with the brick Aqua Julia (125 BC) and minor brick remains of the Aqua Tepula (33 BC) on top, near Romavecchia, Via Lemonia

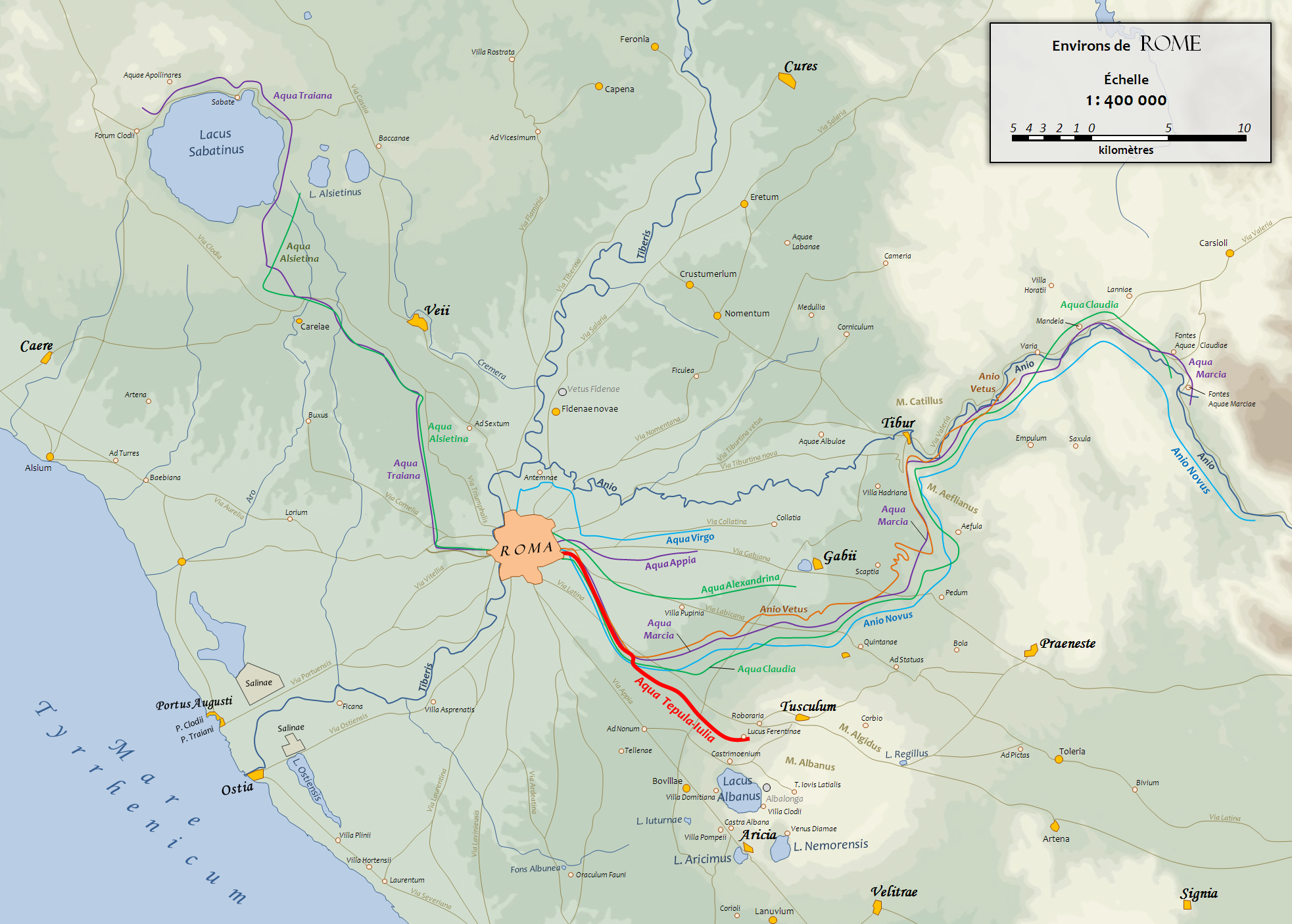
Route of Aqua Julia

The Aqua Julia (or Iulia) is a Roman aqueduct built in 33 BC by Agrippa under Augustus to supply the city of Rome. The building of the aqueduct took quite some time, the works begun in 40 BC. The length of the aqueduct was 23 km (14 mi), and its daily discharge was 48,200 m^{3} (63,000 cu yd).

== History ==
The aqueduct was repaired by Augustus only a few years after it had been completed, an inscription describing the works having been done in 5 BC. Additional repaires were done in 79 AD by Titus, and during the 2nd century AD, around 196 AD, it was expanded further north (up to the Viminal Gate). Later, during the rule of Severan dynasty, the aqueduct underwent again extensive repairs in 196 AD by Severus and in 212 AD by Caracalla, and an additional channel was added to it. Though some remains of later repairs have been found, their dating has not been established.

== Route ==
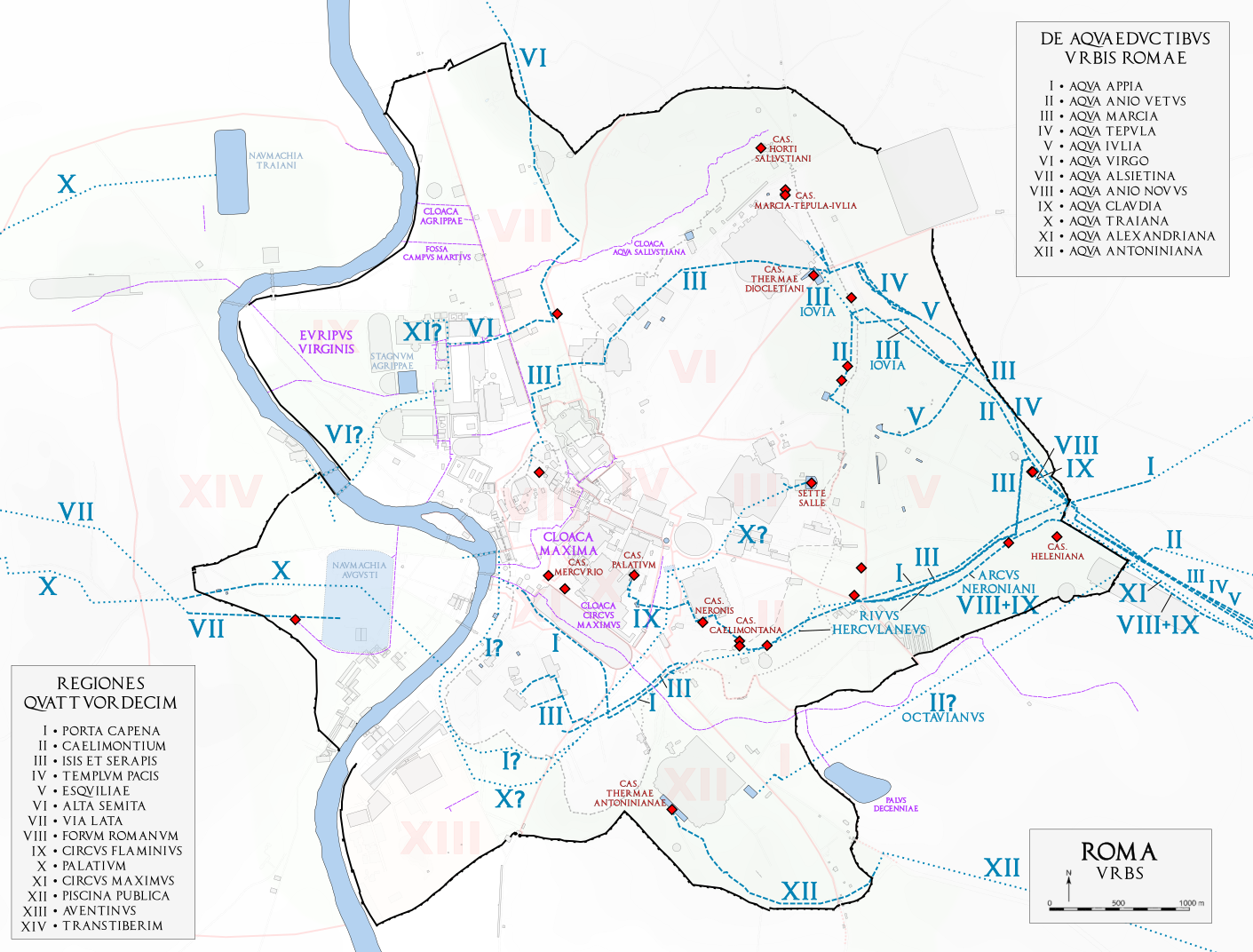
Route within Rome

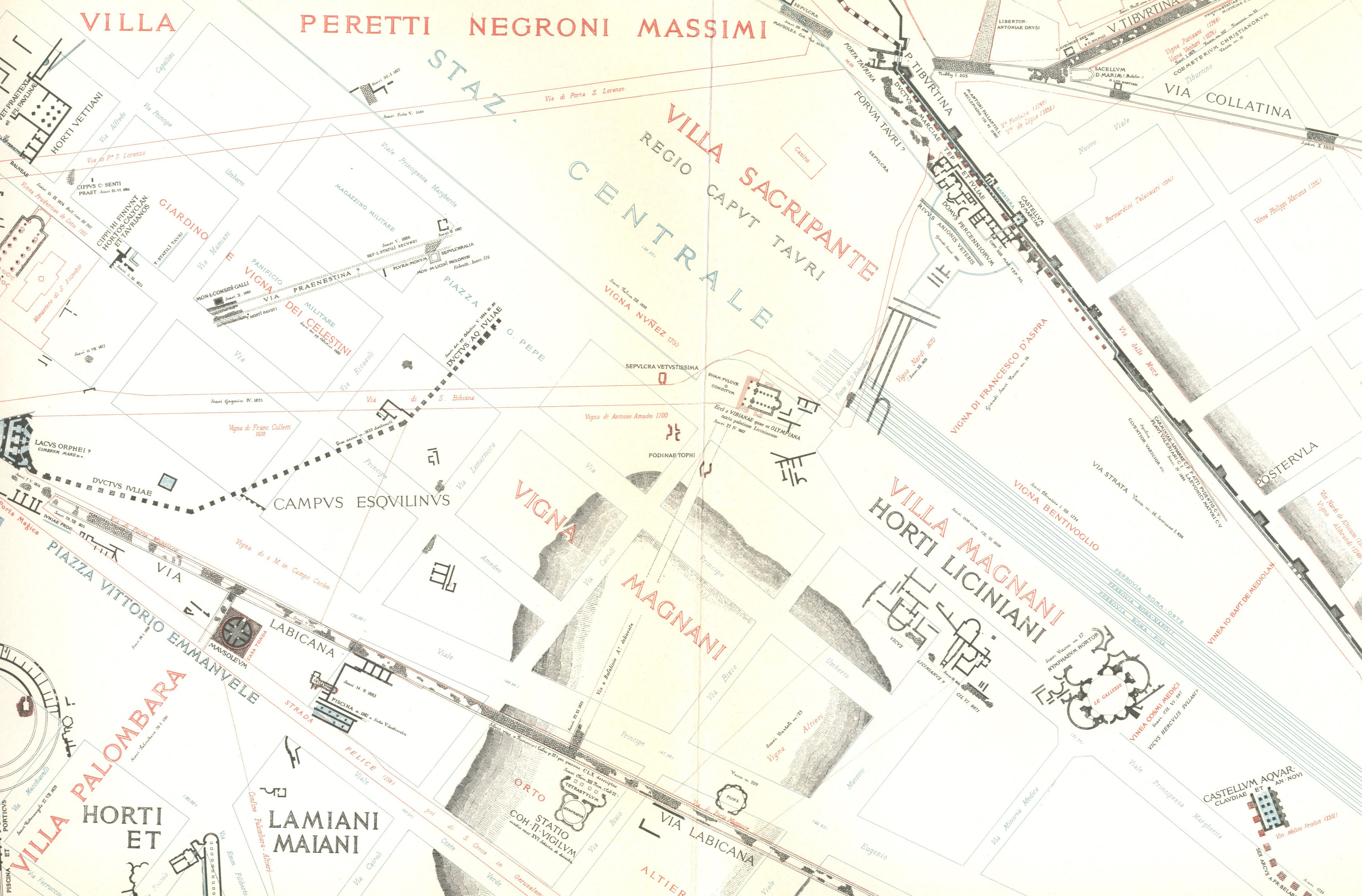
Terminus in Lacus Orphei, Esquiline, Lanciani Map 24, 1901

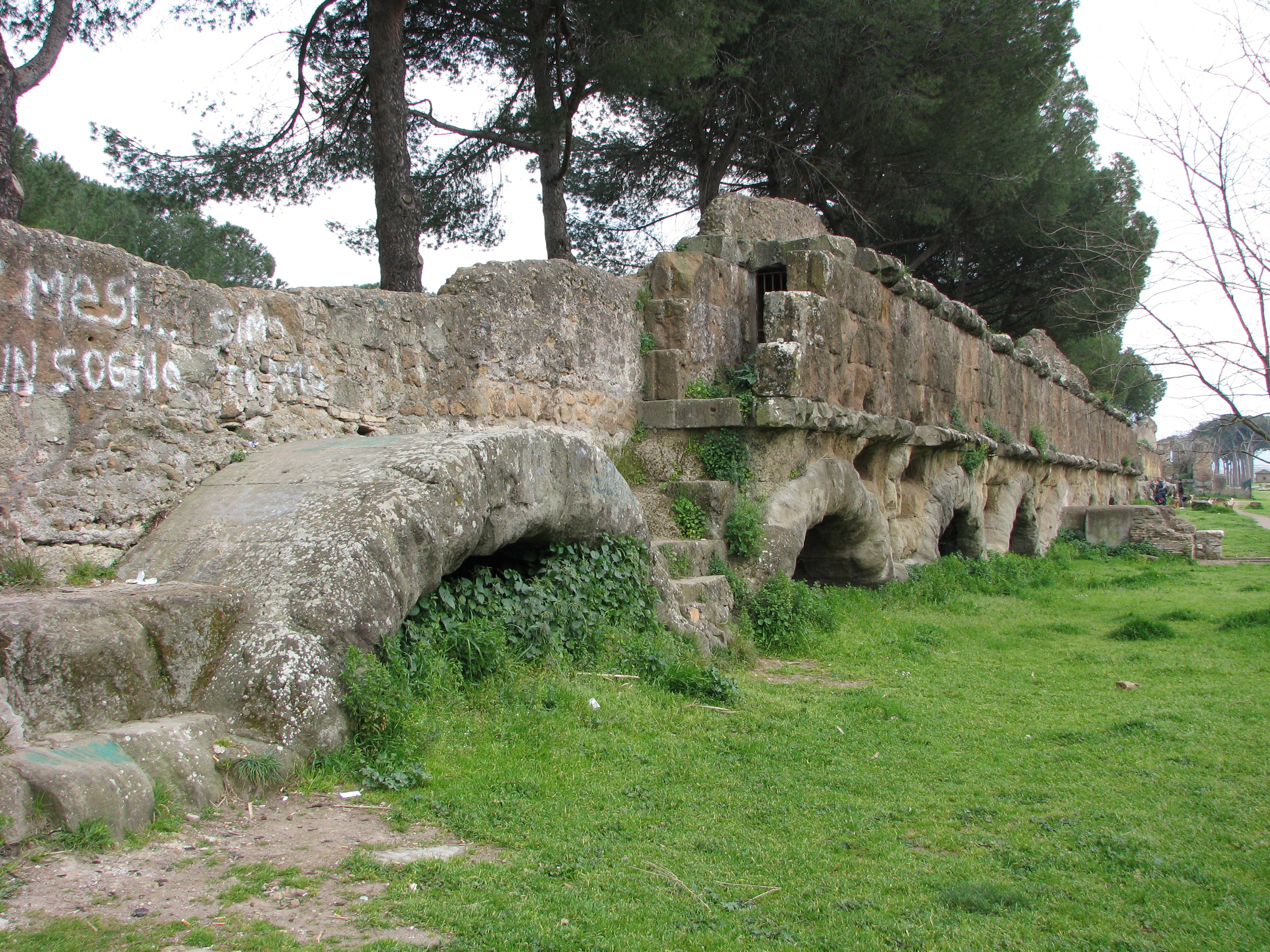
Part of the Aqua Marcia

Though Frontinus stated that the springs were two miles to the right of the twelfth mile of the via Latina, the source of the Aqua Iulia is situated approximately a half-mile north of the abbey of Grottaferrata at the present bridge of the "Squarciarelli", not far from those that fed the Aqua Tepula aqueduct.

Given the proximity to the sources of the Tepula, the two conduits converged and then travelled together underground from a point not yet identified, up to the limaria pool (the settling basin) where they mixed and which was located in the current Capannelle area near the Aqua Marcia. From there the conduits separated again, continuing on the surface and using, for about 9.6 km, the arches already built for the Aqua Marcia aqueduct, suitably restructured to support the conduits. The triple duct is still visible in the stretches of arches left standing, with the Aqua Tepula on top. They reached the city at ad spem veterem, near Porta Maggiore.

From here the conduits used the Aurelian walls and crossed via Tiburtina on an arch which became Porta Tiburtina. The route then returned underground, passed the Viminal gate, where Termini Station stands today, and ended near the Porta Collina, where the main distribution castellum was, near the current via XX Settembre. It may have fed the nymphaeum called Lacus Orphei as shown on the map of Rodolfo Lanciani.

By using 17 castella divisorum the Aqua Iulia, together with the Tepula, supplied the Caelian, Esquiline, Viminale, Quirinale, Campidoglio, Palatine and Piccolo Aventine hills, in addition to the Fora.

After the first repairs carried out by Augustus between 11 and 4 BC, others were done by Caracalla and then by Alexander Severus who used the water to supply the monumental fountain of the nymphaeum Alexandri (or Trophies of Marius) still visible in the Piazza Vittorio.

Frontinus states that, prior to the construction of the Aqua Claudia, the Marcia and Iulia supplied the Caelian and the Aventine. In Frontinus's own lifetime, a section of the Marcia was diverted at Spes Vetus and was delivered to the reservoirs of the former hill.

== Possible branch ==
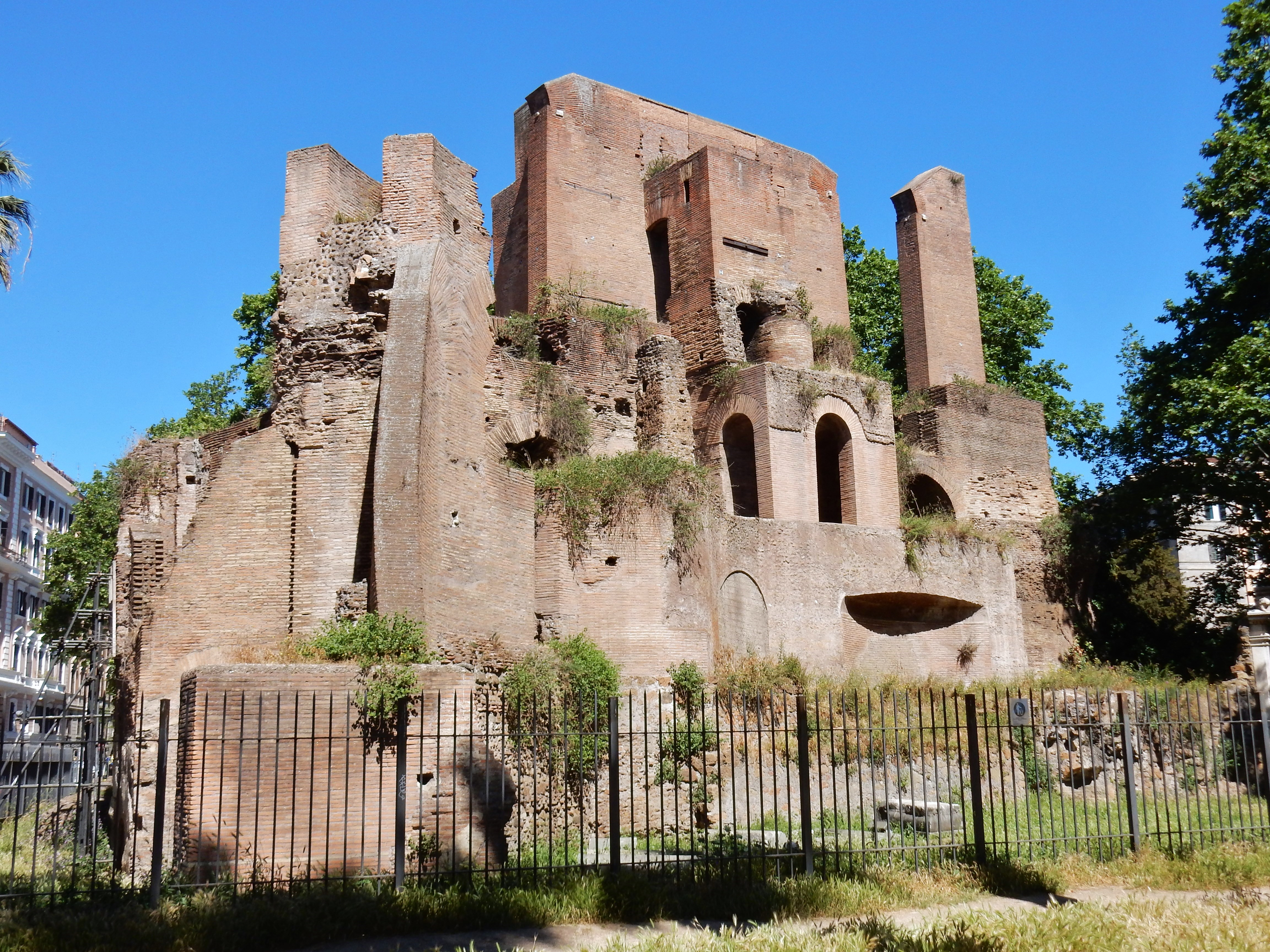
Nymphaeum Alexandri

Some arches remain in the Piazza Guglielmo Pepe, which suggests that a branch ran to the Nymphaeum Alexandri. The identification of this branch with the Aqua Iulia is dependent on the specus (channel) that runs upon it being only 0.3 m below the bottom of the specus of the aqueduct at Porta Maggiore, which is at 63.7 m above sea-level. However, the level of the bottom of the Aqua Iulia located just outside Porta Maggiore is given as 57.4 m above sea-level. If this is accurate, the branch must have originated from the Aqua Claudia or the Anio Novus.

== Marker stones ==
Nine cippi are known, all dated from the time of Augustus.

No. 302 has been found near the springs, and 281 not far south of the abbey; others (157, 156, 154, 153) have come to light at Capannelle near the seventh mile of the via Latina, before the channel begins to run above ground upon the arches of the Aqua Marcia.

The aforementioned group has been dated back to the 14–11 BC restoration. However, another cippus has been located, north of the abbey, bearing the number 2. It dates from 14 BC, and is, it is presumed, the result of another restoration by Augustus, of which there is no record.

== See also ==
- List of aqueducts in the city of Rome
- List of aqueducts in the Roman Empire
- List of Roman aqueducts by date
- Parco degli Acquedotti
- Ancient Roman technology
- Roman engineering
