= Lucius Cornelius Cinna (consul 127 BC) =

Roman consul in 127 BC

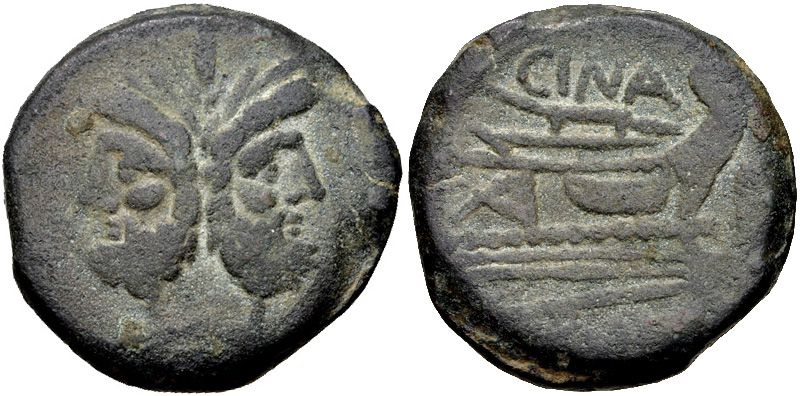
Roman Republic Lucius Cornelius Cinna (consul 127 BC). 169-158 BC. Æ As (31mm, 24.55 g, 1h)

Lucius Cornelius Cinna was a Roman politician. He was consul in 127 BC with Lucius Cassius Longinus Ravilla. He possibly served as an envoy in 136 BC to "restrain" Marcus Aemilius Lepidus Porcina from attacking the Hispanic Vaccaei before having been elected to the praetorship some time before 130 BC.

== Bibliography ==
- Broughton, Thomas Robert Shannon (1951). The magistrates of the Roman republic. Vol. 1. New York: American Philological Association.
- Broughton, Thomas Robert Shannon (1952). The magistrates of the Roman republic. Vol. 2. New York: American Philological Association.

Preceded by Titus Annius Rufus and Gnaeus Octavius	Consul of the Roman Republic; 127 BC; With: Lucius Cassius Longinus Ravilla	Succeeded by Marcus Aemilius Lepidus and Lucius Aurelius Orestes
