= Double dative =

Concept in Latin grammar

In Latin grammar, a double dative is the combination of a dative of reference with a dative of purpose. A common translation is "As a (dative of purpose) with reference to (dative of reference)." This was formerly known as "predicate dative" or "dative of service", with usually the following characteristics of the noun in the dative of purpose:

1. the noun is abstract or semi-abstract;
2. this noun is only in the singular;
3. this noun is used predicatively;
4. there is usually no verb but a form of esse is often understood;
5. this noun is rarely qualified by an adjective unless one like magnus;
6. the noun is rarely qualified by a genitive.

According to a standard 1893 grammar, only a few nouns are used in this construction which appears to be "governed by custom, not by any principle".

In an example from Caesar (Gallic War 7.50): suis saluti fuit, "he was the salvation of his men", the dative of an abstract noun (salus "salvation") expresses purpose while the dative of reference expresses the person or thing affected (suus, pl. sui "his [men]").

The best known example is "Cui bono?" This phrase, taken from Cicero, is usually rendered in English as something like, "Who benefits?", or more literally "To whose advantage?" The double dative construction sounds unnatural if translated literally, "to whom for an advantage", and is better rendered as "to whom as an advantage".

== See also ==
- Dative case
