= Gaius Laelius Sapiens =

Roman statesman

Gaius Laelius Sapiens (born c. 188 BC), was a Roman statesman, best known for his friendship with the Roman general and statesman Scipio Aemilianus (Scipio the Younger) (d. 129 BC). He was consul of 140 BC, elected with the help of his friend, by then censor, after failing to be elected in 141 BC. Gaius Laelius Sapiens was the son and heir of the Punic War general Gaius Laelius, himself consul in 190 BC. This Laelius had been former second-in-command and long-time friend, since childhood, of the Roman general and statesman Scipio Africanus. The younger Laelius was apparently born around 188 BC, after his father had become consul but had failed to win command of the campaign against Antiochus III the Great of Syria, which would have made him a rich man. His mother's name is unknown.

== Military career ==
During the Third Punic War, in 147 BC, Laelius accompanied Scipio to Africa, and distinguished himself at the capture of the cothon, the military harbour of Carthage. In 145 he carried on operations with moderate success against Viriathus in Spain.

== Political significance ==
Laelius was a candidate for the consulship in 141 BC, but withdrew his candidacy thanks to the false promises of a novus homo, Quintus Pompeius (a distant relative of the future Pompey the Great), who promised to also step down but then returned to the field after Laelius had formally withdrawn. Pompeius thus became consul along with Gnaeus Servilius Caepio (of a family traditionally allied with the Cornelii Scipiones), and Scipio Aemilianus suffered a humiliating political reverse. Aemilianus got his friend elected consul in the following year (140 BC) along with Quintus Servilius Caepio, who was the third successive Servilii Caepione brother to become consul in as many years.

Laelius was called Sapiens ("wise") because of his decision not to undertake efforts at political reform that were beginning to create serious dissension in the Roman Senate. These efforts at reform had been initially proposed by Scipio Aemilianus but abandoned by him when the Senate failed to agree unanimously as he had demanded. Laelius was seen as wise because he avoided creating further dissension at the time; however, his unwillingness to stick his neck out led to a political schism within the Scipionic Circle. The reform program abandoned by Scipio and his circle of intimates, including Laelius, were later taken up by the brothers Publius Mucius Scaevola and Publius Licinius Crassus Dives Mucianus, and partially implemented by their relatives by marriage, the Brothers Gracchi. Despite this connection to radical reformers who were killed for their efforts, Laelius's own political significance is slight. Furthermore, Laelius prosecuted Tiberius Gracchus' supporters and opposed Gaius Papirius Carbo's plan to permit the reelection of tribunes.

Laelius delivered other significant speeches: De Collegiis (145) against the proposal of the tribune Gaius Licinius Crassus to deprive the priestly colleges of their right of co-optation and to transfer the power of election to the people, Pro Publicanis (139) on behalf of the farmers of the revenue, and Pro Se, a speech in his own defence, delivered in answer to Carbo and Gracchus. He also delivered funeral orations, amongst them two on his friend Scipio.

== Cultural significance ==
Laelius was a member of the Scipionic Circle, a Graecophile group of friends and political allies who gathered around the wealthy and well-connected Scipio Aemilianus, adoptive grandson of Scipio Africanus. He studied philosophy under the Stoics Diogenes of Babylon and Panaetius of Rhodes and was also a poet. As heir to the most prominent branch of the wealthy Cornelii Scipiones, Scipio Aemilianus was able to act as patron to many Greek scholars, philosophers, and historians, including the Greek historian Polybius and the Carthaginian-born playwright Terence.

Laelius's two sons-in-law were both consuls - Gaius Fannius who was consul in 122 BC along with Gnaeus Domitius Ahenobarbus (in the second tribunate of Gaius Sempronius Gracchus), and Quintus Mucius Scaevola Augur, who was consul in 117 BC. The younger son-in-law, himself connected by marriage to the Brothers Gracchi, was a prominent rhetorician and jurist, and the teacher and mentor of young Cicero. Cicero thus learned much about Laelius and his relationships with great men from his mentor Scaevola Augur. Some of those relationships were inspiration and source material for Cicero's treatises on friendship.

In Cicero's later essay De Senectute (On Old Age), Laelius is depicted, alongside his friend Scipio, as admiring Cato the Elder for how well he bears his old age.

== Family ==
According to Cicero, relying on Mucius Scaevola for first-hand information, the younger Gaius Laelius was married all his life to one woman, whose name is not mentioned. By her, he had two surviving daughters, both of whom married consuls. Cicero states that Laelia Minor, the wife of Quintus Mucius Scaevola Augur, and her two daughters (as well as their daughters) were known for the quality and purity of their Latin. The younger daughter of Scaevola Augur and his wife Laelia was Mucia Secunda, who was wife of Lucius Licinius Crassus, consul in 91 BC, who was patron to the young Cicero. Crassus and his wife Mucia had two surviving daughters, the elder of whom married a praetor Publius Cornelius Scipio Nasica, descended from several consuls and censors and had several children including Metellus Scipio.

Political offices
Preceded by Gnaeus Servilius Caepio; Quintus Pompeius	Roman consul 140 BC with Quintus Servilius Caepio	Succeeded by Gnaeus Calpurnius Piso; Marcus Popillius Laenas
