= Cui bono? =

Latin phrase meaning "who benefits?"

Cui bono? (Classical Latin: [kui̯ ˈbɔnoː]), in English "to whom is it a benefit?", is a Latin phrase about identifying crime suspects. It depends on the fact that crimes are often committed to benefit their perpetrators; especially financially.

== Use ==
The phrase is a double dative construction. It can also be rendered as cui prodest? ("whom does it profit?") and ad cuius bonum? ("for whose good?").

== Background ==
L. Cassius ille, quem populus Romanus verissimum et sapientissimum iudicem putabat, identidem in causis quaerere solebat, cui bono fuisset?

— Cicero: 'Pro Roscio Amerino'
Translation:

Lucius Cassius, whom the Roman people used to regard as a most honest and most wise judge, was in the habit of asking time and again in lawsuits: "to whom might it be for a benefit?"

Cicero used the expression Cui bono in his 'Second Philippic', once again invoking Cassius as the source: "... adopt that maxim of Cassius: To whose advantage was it?" American sociologist Peter Blau also used the concept of cui bono to differentiate organizations depending on who has primarily benefited: owners; members; specific others; or the general society.

== See also ==
- Cherchez la femme
- Follow the money
- Whodunit

General:

- Brocard (law)
- List of Latin phrases
- List of legal Latin terms
