= Dative case =

Grammatical case generally used to indicate the noun to which something is given

In grammar, the dative case (abbreviated dat, or sometimes d when it is a core argument) is a grammatical case used in some languages to indicate the recipient or beneficiary of an action, as in "Maria Jacobo potum dedit", Latin for "Maria gave Jacob a drink" or "Maria gave a drink to Jacob". In this example, with a suffix of "o" to the name "Jacob", the dative marks what would be considered the indirect object of a verb in English.

Sometimes the dative has functions unrelated to giving. In Scottish Gaelic and Irish, the term dative case is used in traditional grammars to refer to the prepositional case-marking of nouns following simple prepositions and the definite article. In Georgian and Hindustani (Hindi-Urdu), the dative case can also mark the subject of a sentence. This is called the dative construction. In Hindi, the dative construction is not limited to only certain verbs or tenses and it can be used with any verb in any tense or mood.

The dative was common among early Indo-European languages and has survived to the present in the Balto-Slavic branch, the Germanic branch, Albanian and others. It also exists in similar forms in several non-Indo-European languages, such as the Uralic family of languages. In some languages, the dative case has assimilated the functions of other, now extinct cases. In Ancient Greek, the dative has the functions of the Proto-Indo-European locative and instrumental as well as those of the original dative.

Under the influence of English, which uses the preposition "to" for (among other uses) both indirect objects (give to) and directions of movement (go to), the term "dative" has sometimes been used to describe cases that in other languages would more appropriately be called lative.

== Etymology ==
"Dative" comes from Latin cāsus datīvus ("case for giving"), a translation of Greek δοτικὴ πτῶσις, dotikē ptôsis ("inflection for giving"). Dionysius Thrax in his The Art of Grammar also refers to it as epistaltikḗ "for sending (a letter)", from the verb epistéllō "send to", a word from the same root as epistle.

== English ==
The Old English language had a dative case; however, the English case system gradually fell into disuse during the Middle English period, when the accusative and dative of pronouns merged into a single oblique case that was also used with all prepositions. This conflation of case in Middle and Modern English has led most modern grammarians to discard the "accusative" and "dative" labels as obsolete in reference to English, often using the term "objective" for oblique.

=== Set expressions ===
The dative case is rare in modern English usage, but it can be argued that it survives in a few set expressions. One example is the word "methinks", with the meaning "it seems to me". It survives in this fixed form from Old English (having undergone, however, phonetic changes with the rest of the language), in which it was constructed as "[it]" + "me" (the dative case of the personal pronoun) + "thinks" (i.e., "seems", < Old English þyncan, "to seem", a verb closely related to the verb þencan, "to think", but distinct from it in Old English; later it merged with "think" and lost this meaning).

=== Relic pronouns ===
The modern objective case pronoun whom is derived from the dative case in Old English, specifically the Old English dative pronoun "hwām" (as opposed to the modern subjective "who", which descends from Old English "hwā") – though "whom" also absorbed the functions of the Old English accusative pronoun "hwone". It is also cognate to the word "wem" (the dative form of "wer") in German. The OED defines all classical uses of the word "whom" in situations where the indirect object is not known – in effect, indicating the anonymity of the indirect object.

Likewise, some of the object forms of personal pronouns are remnants of Old English datives. For example, "him" goes back to the Old English dative him (accusative was hine), and "her" goes back to the dative hire (accusative was hīe). These pronouns are not pure datives in modern English; they are also used for functions previously indicated by the accusative.

=== Modern English ===
The indirect object of the verb may be placed between the verb and the direct object of the verb: "he gave me a book" or "he wrote me a poem."

The indirect object may also be expressed using a prepositional phrase using "to": "he gave a book to me".

== German ==
In general, the dative (German: Dativ) is used to mark the indirect object of a German sentence.

For example:

- Ich schickte dem Mann(e) das Buch. (literally: I sent "to the man" the book.) – Masculine
- Ich gab der Frau den Stift zurück. (literally: I gave "to the woman" the pencil back.) – Feminine
- Ich überreiche dem Kind(e) ein Geschenk. (literally: I hand "to the child" a present.) – Neuter

In English, the first sentence can be rendered as "I sent the book to the man" and as "I sent the man the book", where the indirect object is identified in English by standing in front of the direct object. The normal word order in German is to put the dative in front of the accusative (as in the example above). However, since the German dative is marked in form, it can also be put after the accusative: Ich schickte das Buch dem Mann(e). The (e) after Mann and Kind signifies a now largely archaic -e ending for certain nouns in the dative. It survives today almost exclusively in set phrases such as zu Hause (at home, lit. to house), im Zuge (in the course of), and am Tage (during the day, lit. at the day), as well as in occasional usage in formal prose, poetry, and song lyrics.

Some masculine nouns (and one neuter noun, Herz [heart]), referred to as weak nouns or n-nouns, take an -n or -en in the dative singular and plural. Many are masculine nouns ending in -e in the nominative (such as Name [name], Beamte [officer], and Junge [boy]), although not all such nouns follow this rule. Many also, whether or not they fall into the former category, refer to people, animals, professions, or titles; exceptions to this include the aforementioned Herz and Name, as well as Buchstabe (letter), Friede (peace), Obelisk (obelisk), Planet (planet), and others.

Certain German prepositions require the dative: aus (from), außer (out of), bei (at, near), entgegen (against), gegenüber (opposite), mit (with), nach (after, to), seit (since), von (from), and zu (at, in, to). Some other prepositions (an [at], auf [on], entlang [along], hinter [behind], in [in, into], neben (beside, next to), über [over, across], unter [under, below], vor [in front of], and zwischen [among, between]) may be used with dative (indicating current location), or accusative (indicating direction toward something). Das Buch liegt auf dem Tisch(e) (dative: The book is lying on the table), but Ich lege das Buch auf den Tisch (accusative: I put the book onto the table).

In addition the four prepositions [an]statt (in place of), trotz (in spite of), während (during), and wegen (because of) which require the genitive in modern formal language, are most commonly used with the dative in colloquial German. For example, "because of the weather" is expressed as wegen dem Wetter instead of the formally correct wegen des Wetters. Other prepositions requiring the genitive in formal language, are combined with von ("of") in colloquial style, e.g. außerhalb vom Garten instead of außerhalb des Gartens ("outside the garden").

The concept of an indirect object may be rendered by a prepositional phrase. In this case, the noun's or pronoun's case is determined by the preposition, not by its function in the sentence. Consider this sentence:

- Ich sandte das Buch zum Verleger. 'I sent the book to the editor.'

Here, the subject, Ich, is in the nominative case, the direct object, das Buch, is in the accusative case, and zum Verleger is in the dative case, since zu always requires the dative (zum is a contraction of zu + dem). However:

- Ich habe das Buch an meinen Freund (accusative) weitergegeben. 'I forwarded the book to my friend.' (weitergeben = lit.: to give further).

In this sentence, Freund is the indirect object, but, because it follows an (direction), the accusative is required, not the dative.

All of the articles change in the dative case.

	Masculine	Feminine	Neuter	Plural
Definite article	dem	der	dem	den
Indefinite article	einem	einer	einem	Ø (the semantically closest word would be einigen, dative plural of einig)
Negative articles	keinem	keiner	keinem	keinen

Some German verbs require the dative for their direct objects. Common examples are antworten (to answer), danken (to thank), gefallen (to please), folgen (to follow), glauben (to believe), helfen (to help), and raten (to advise). In each case, the direct object of the verb is rendered in the dative. For example:

- Meine Freunde helfen mir. (My friends help me.)

These verbs cannot be used in normal passive constructions, because German allows these only for verbs with accusative objects. It is therefore ungrammatical to say: *Ich werde geholfen. "I am helped." Instead a special construction called "impersonal passive" must be used: Mir wird geholfen, literally: "To me is helped." A colloquial (non-standard) way to form the passive voice for dative verbs is the following: Ich kriege geholfen, or: Ich bekomme geholfen, literally: "I get helped". The use of the verb "to get" here reminds us that the dative case has something to do with giving and receiving. In German, help is not something you perform on somebody, but rather something you offer them.

The dative case is also used with reflexive (sich) verbs when specifying what part of the self the verb is being done to:

- Ich wasche mich. – accusative (I wash myself.)
- Ich wasche mir die Hände. – dative (I wash my hands, literally "I wash for myself the hands")

Cf. the respective accord in French: "Les enfants se sont lavés" ("The children have washed themselves") vs. "Les enfants se sont lavé [uninflected] les mains" ("... their hands").

German can use two datives to make sentences like: Sei mir meinem Sohn(e) gnädig! "For my sake, have mercy on my son!" Literally: "Be for me to my son merciful." The first dative mir ("for me") expresses the speaker's commiseration (much like the dativus ethicus in Latin, see below). The second dative meinem Sohn(e) ("to my son") names the actual object of the plea. Mercy is to be given to the son for or on behalf of his mother/father.

Adjective endings also change in the dative case. There are three inflection possibilities depending on what precedes the adjective. They most commonly use weak inflection when preceded by a definite article (the), mixed inflection after an indefinite article (a/an), and strong inflection when a quantity is indicated (many green apples).

Adj. in dative case	Masculine	Feminine	Neuter	Plural
Weak inflection	-en	-en	-en	-en
Mixed inflection	-en	-en	-en	-en
Strong inflection	-em	-er	-em	-en

== Latin ==
There are several uses for the dative case (Dativus):

- Dativus finalis (dative of purpose), e.g. non scholae sed vitae – "[we learn] not for school, but for life", auxilio vocare – "to call for help", venio auxilio – "I'm coming for help", accipio dono – "I receive [this] as a gift" or puellae ornamento est – "[this] is for the girl's decoration", or "... for decoration for the girl" (as puellae could be either dative or genitive)
- Dativus commodi (incommodi), which means action for (or against) somebody, e.g., Graecis agros colere – "to till fields for Greeks"; Combination of Dativus commodi and finalis (double dative): tibi laetitiae "to you for joy"
- Dativus possessivus (possessive dative) which means possession, e.g. angelis alae sunt – literally "to (or for) the angels are wings", this is typically found with a copula and translated as "angels have wings".
- Dativus ethicus (ethic dative) indicates that the person in the dative is or should be especially concerned about the action, e.g. Quid mihi Celsus agit? "What is Celsus doing for me?" (expressing the speaker being especially interested in what Celsus is doing for him or her); or Cui prodest? "Whose interest does this serve?" (literally "To whom does this do good?")
- Dativus auctoris, meaning; 'in the eyes of', e.g., vir bonus mihi videtur 'he seems to me to be a good man'.
- The dative expresses agency with the gerundive when the gerundive is used to convey obligation or necessity, e.g., haec nobis agenda sunt, 'these things must be done by us.'

== Greek ==
=== Ancient ===
In addition to its main function as the dativus, the dative case has other functions in Classical Greek.

The chart below uses the Latin names for the types of dative; the Greek name for the dative is δοτική πτῶσις, like its Latin equivalent, derived from the verb "to give"; in Ancient Greek, δίδωμι.

- Dativus finalis: The dativus finalis, or the 'dative of purpose', is when the dative is used to denote the purpose of a certain action. For example:
  - "τῷ βασιλεῖ μάχομαι"
    - "I fight for the king".
  - "θνῄσκω τῇ τιμῇ"
    - "I die for honour".
- Dativus commŏdi (incommodi): The dativus commodi sive incommodi, or the 'dative of benefit (or harm)' is the dative that expresses the advantage or disadvantage of something for someone. For example:
  - For the benefit of: "πᾶς ἀνὴρ αὑτῷ πονεῖ" (Sophocles, Ajax 1366).
    - "Every man toils for himself".
  - For the harm or disadvantage of: "ἥδε ἡ ἡμέρα τοῖς Ἕλλησι μεγάλων κακῶν ἄρξει." (Thucydides 2.12.4).
    - "This day will be the beginning of great sorrows for the Greeks (i.e., for their disadvantage)".
- Dativus possessivus: The dativus possessivus, or the 'dative of possession' is the dative used to denote the possessor of a certain object or objects. For example:
  - "ἄλλοις μὲν γὰρ χρήματά ἐστι πολλὰ καὶ νῆες καὶ ἵπποι, ἡμῖν δὲ ξύμμαχοι ἀγαθοί." (Thucycdides 1.86.3).
    - "For others have a lot of money and ships and horses, but we have good allies (i.e., To others there is a lot of money...)".
- Dativus ethicus: The dativus ethicus, or the 'ethic or polite dative,' is when the dative is used to signify that the person or thing spoken of is regarded with interest by someone. This dative is mostly, if not exclusively, used in pronouns. As such, it is also called the "dative of pronouns." For example:
  - "τούτῳ πάνυ μοι προσέχετε τὸν νοῦν." (Demosthenes 18.178).
    - "Pay close attention to this, I beg you (i.e., please pay..)".
  - "ὦ μῆτερ, ὡς καλός μοι ὁ πάππος." (Xenophon, Cyropaedia 18.178).
    - "Oh, mother, how handsome grandpa is (I've just realized!)".
- Dativus auctoris: The dativus auctoris, or the 'dative of agent,' is the dative used to denote the doer of an action. Note, however, that in Classical Greek, the agent is usually in the genitive after ὑπό (by, at the hands of). The agent is in the dative most often with the perfect and pluperfect passive, and with the verbal adjective in -τέος. For example:
  - "πολλαὶ θεραπεῖαι τοῖς ἰατροῖς εὕρηνται." (Isocrates 8.39)
    - "Many cures have been discovered by doctors."
- Dativus instrumenti: The dativus instrumenti, or the 'dative of instrument,' is when the dative is used to denote an instrument or means of a certain action (or, more accurately, as the instrumental case). For example:
  - "με κτείνει δόλῳ." (Homer, Odyssey 9.407)
    - "He kills me with a bait (i.e., by means of a bait)."
- Dativus modi: The dativus modi, or the 'dative of manner,' is the dative used to describe the manner or way by which something happened. For example:
  - "νόσῳ ὕστερον ἀποθανόντα." (Thucydides 8.84)
    - "having died of (from) a disease."
- Dativus mensurae: The dativus mensurae, or the 'dative of measurement,' is the dative used to denote the measurement of difference. For example:
  - "τῇ κεφαλῇ μείζονα." (Plato, Phaedo 101a)
    - "taller by a head."
  - "μακρῷ ἄριστος." (Plato, Laws 729d)
    - "by far the best."

The articles in the Greek dative are

Definite article
	Masculine	Neuter	Feminine
Singular	ΤΩΙ (τῷ)		ΤΗΙ (τῇ)
Plural	ΤΟΙΣ (τοῖς)		ΤΑΙΣ (ταῖς)

=== Modern ===
The dative case, strictly speaking, no longer exists in Modern Greek, except in fossilized expressions like δόξα τω Θεώ (from the ecclesiastical τῷ Θεῷ δόξα, "Glory to God") or εντάξει (ἐν τάξει, lit. "in order", i.e. "all right" or "OK"). Otherwise, most of the functions of the dative are expressed by the genitive or by prepositional phrases.

== Slavic languages ==
=== Russian ===
In Russian, the dative case is used for indicating the indirect object of an action (that to which something is given, thrown, read, etc.). In the instance where a person is the goal of motion, dative is used instead of accusative to indicate motion toward. This is usually achieved with the preposition κ + destination in dative case; К врачу, meaning "to the doctor."

Dative is also the necessary case taken by certain prepositions when expressing certain ideas. For instance, when the preposition по is used to mean "along", its object is always in dative case, as in По бокам, meaning "along the sides."

=== Polish ===
Polish uses dative case when:

- after certain verbs (dziękować komuś "to thank someone", pomóc komuś "to help someone", wierzyć komuś "to believe someone")
- in certain expressions (Czy podoba ci się piosenka? "Do you like the song?", Jest mi zimno "I'm cold", Jest nam smutno "We're feeling sad", Będzie wam trudniej... "It will be more difficult for you guys"), Śniło jej się, że... "She dreamt that"
- dativus commodi to indicate action for somebody (Zbuduję temu człowiekowi dom "I will build a house for this person")
- when something is taken away or something occurs to someone (Zdechł im pies "Their dog died"; Zabrali mu komputer "They took away his computer"; Zepsuł nam się samochód "Our car broke down"; Coś mi się przypomniało "I just remembered something")

For example, in Polish, syn ("son") and ojciec ("father") are both masculine singular nouns, and they will change:

syn → synowi and ojciec → ojcu

=== Serbo-Croatian ===
Some other kinds of dative use as found in the Serbo-Croatian language are: Dativus finalis (Titaniku u pomoć "to Titanic's rescue"), Dativus commodi/incommodi (Operi svojoj majci suđe "Wash the dishes for your mother"), Dativus possessivus (Ovcama je dlaka gusta "Sheep's hair is thick"), Dativus ethicus (Šta/što mi radi Boni? "What is Boni doing? (I am especially interested in what it is)") and Dativus auctoris (Izgleda mi okej "It seems okay to me").

== Baltic languages ==
Both Lithuanian and Latvian have a distinct dative case in the system of nominal declensions.

Lithuanian nouns preserve Indo-European inflections in the dative case fairly well: (o-stems) vaikas -> sg. vaikui, pl. vaikams; (ā-stems) ranka -> sg. rankai, pl. rankoms; (i-stems) viltis -> sg. vilčiai, pl. viltims; (u-stems) sūnus -> sg. sūnui, pl. sūnums; (consonant stems) vanduo -> sg. vandeniui, pl. vandenims.

Adjectives in the dative case receive pronominal endings (this might be the result of a more recent development): tas geras vaikas -> sg. tam geram vaikui, pl. tiems geriems vaikams.

The dative case in Latvian underwent further simplifications – the original masculine endings of both nouns and adjectives have been replaced with pronominal inflections: tas vīrs -> sg. tam vīram, pl. tiem vīriem. Also, the final "s" in all Dative forms has been dropped. The only exception is personal pronouns in the plural: mums (to us), jums (to you). In colloquial Lithuanian the final "s" in the dative is often omitted, as well: time geriem vaikam.

In both Latvian and Lithuanian, the main function of the dative case is to render the indirect object in a sentence: (lt) aš duodu vyrui knygą; (lv) es dodu [duodu] vīram grāmatu – I am giving a book to the man.

The dative case can also be used with gerundives to indicate an action preceding or simultaneous with the main action in a sentence: (lt) jam įėjus, visi atsistojo – when he walked in, everybody stood up, lit. to him having walked in, all stood up; (lt) jai miegant, visi dirbo – while she slept, everybody was working, lit. to her sleeping, all were working.

In modern standard Lithuanian, Dative case is not required by prepositions, although in many dialects it is done frequently: (dial.) iki (+D) šiai dienai, (stand.) iki (+G) šios dienos – up until this day.

In Latvian, the dative case is taken by several prepositions in the singular and all prepositions in the plural (due to peculiar historical changes): sg. bez (+G) tevis (without thee) ~ pl. bez (+D) jums (without you); sg. pa (+A) ceļu (along the road) ~ pl. pa (+D) ceļiem (along the roads).

== Armenian ==
In modern Eastern Armenian, the dative is attained by adding any article to the genitive:

dog = շուն
GEN > շան (of the dog; dog's) with no articles
DAT > շանը or շանն (to the dog) with definite articles (-ն if preceding a vowel)
DAT > մի շան (to a dog) with indefinite article
DAT > շանս (to my dog) with 1st person possessive article
DAT > շանդ (to your dog) with 2nd person possessive article

There is a general tendency to view -ին as the standard dative suffix, but only because that is its most productive (and therefore common) form. The suffix -ին as a dative marker is nothing but the standard, most common, genitive suffix -ի accompanied by the definite article -ն. But the dative case encompasses indefinite objects as well, which will not be marked by -ին:

Definite DAT > Ես գիրքը տվեցի տղային: (I gave the book to the boy)
Indefinite DAT> Ես գիրքը տվեցի մի տղայի: (I gave the book to a boy)

The main function of the dative marking in Armenian is to indicate the receiving end of an action, more commonly the indirect object which in English is preceded by the preposition to. In the use of "giving" verbs like give, donate, offer, deliver, sell, bring... the dative marks the recipient. With communicative verbs like tell, say, advise, explain, ask, answer... the dative marks the listener. Other verbs whose indirect objects are marked by the dative case in Armenian are show, reach, look, approach...

Eastern Armenian also uses the dative case to mark the time of an event, in the same way English uses the preposition at, as in Meet me at nine o' clock.

== Indo-Aryan languages ==
=== Hindustani (Hindi-Urdu) ===
Hindustani (Hindi-Urdu) has true dative case for pronouns, but for nouns the dative case has to be constructed using the dative case-marker (postposition) को کو (ko) to the nouns in their oblique case. Pronouns in Hindustani also have an oblique case, so dative pronouns can also be alternatively constructed using the dative case-marker को کو (ko) with the pronouns in their oblique case, hence forming two sets of synonymous dative pronouns. The following table shows the pronouns in their nominative and their dative forms. Hindustani lacks pronouns in the third person and the demonstrative pronouns double as the third person pronouns.

Case	Personal Pronouns					Non-Personal Pronouns							
Case	1st Person		2nd Person			Demonstrative				Relative		Interrogative	
Case	1st Person		Intimate	Neutral	Formal	Proximal		Distal		Relative		Interrogative	
Case	Singular	Plural	Singular	Singular & Plural		Singular	Plural	Singular	Plural	Singular	Plural	Singular	Plural
Nominative	मैं میں ma͠i	हम ہم ham	तू تو tū	तुम تم tum	आप آپ āp	यह یہ yah	ये یے ye	वह وہ vah	वे وے ve	जो جو jo		कौन کون kaun	
Dative	मुझे مجھے mujhe	हमें ہمیں hamẽ	तुझे تجھے tujhe	तुम्हें تمھیں tumhẽ	आपको آپ کو āp ko	इसे اسے ise	इन्हें انہیں inhẽ	उसे اسے use	उन्हें انہیں unhẽ	जिसे جسے jise	जिन्हें جنہیں jinhẽ	किसे کیسے kise	किन्हें کنھیں kinhẽ

The table below shows the oblique cases of Hindustani for the nouns boy and girl which take in the dative case-marker after them to assign the combination of the oblique case and the case-marker the dative case. The oblique case of Hindustani by itself has no meaning and adding the case-marker को کو (ko) assigns the oblique case the function of the dative case.

Case	boy		girl	
Case	Singular	Plural	Singular	Plural
Nominative	लड़का لڑکا laṛkā	लड़के لڑکے laṛke	लड़की لڑکی laṛkī	लड़कियाँ لڑکیاں laṛkiyā̃
Dative	लड़के को لڑکے کو laṛke-ko	लड़कों को لڑکوں کو laṛkõ-ko	लड़की को لڑکی کو laṛkī-ko	लड़कियों को لڑکیوں کو laṛkiyõ-ko

Dative case in Hindustani can also mark the subject of a sentence. This is called the dative construction or quirky subjects. In the examples below the dative pronoun passes the subjecthood test of subject-oriented anaphora binding. The dative subject मुझे مجھے (mujhe) binds the anaphora अपने اپنے (apne).

मुझे अपने सभी रिश्तेदार पसंद हैं
مجھے اپنے سبھی رشتےدار پسند ہیں
mujhe_{i} apne_{i} sabhī rishtedār pasand hɛ̄
I.DAT REFL.MASC.PL all.NOM relatives.MASC.PL like be.PRS.MASC.PL
'I like all my relatives'

मुझे अपने काम करने हैं
مجھے اپنے کام کرنے ہیں
mujhe_{i} apne_{i} kām karne hɛ̄
I.DAT REFL.MASC.PL work.NOM do.INF.PTCP.MASC.PL be.PRS.MASC.PL
'I have/want to do my work.'

=== Sanskrit ===
The dative case is known as the "fourth case" (chaturthi-vibhakti) in the usual procedure in the declension of nouns. Its use is mainly for the indirect object.

puruṣo bhāryāyai dadāti — The man gives everything to his wife.

yuddhāyāgacchāmīti bhaṇati vīraḥ — The hero says, "I come for battle."

The fourth case can also be used to indicate a recipient of worship.

namo buddhāya — Homage to the Buddha.

== Non-Indo-European languages ==
=== Hungarian ===
As with many other languages, the dative case is used in Hungarian to show the indirect object of a verb. For example, Dánielnek adtam ezt a könyvet (I gave this book to Dániel). It has two suffixes, -nak and -nek; the correct one is selected by vowel harmony. The personal dative pronouns follow the -nek version: nekem, neked, etc. This case is also used to express "for" in certain circumstances, such as "I bought a gift for Mother". In possessive constructions the nak/nek endings are also used but this is not the dative form (rather, the attributive or possessive case)

=== Finnish ===
Finnish does not have a separate dative case. However, the allative case can fulfill essentially the same role as dative, beyond its primary meaning of directional movement (that is, going somewhere or approaching someone). For example: He lahjoittivat kaikki rahansa köyhille (They donated all their money to the poor.) It is similar in Estonian.

=== Tsez ===
In the Northeast Caucasian languages, such as Tsez, the dative also takes the functions of the lative case in marking the direction of an action. By some linguists, they are still regarded as two separate cases in those languages, although the suffixes are exactly the same for both cases. Other linguists list them separately only for the purpose of separating syntactic cases from locative cases. An example with the ditransitive verb "show" (literally: "make see") is given below:

Кидбā ужихъор кIетIу биквархо.
kidb-ā uži-qo-r kʼetʼu b-ikʷa-r-xo
girl:OBL-ERG boy-POSS-DAT/LAT cat:[III]:ABS III-see-CAUS-PRES
"The girl shows the cat to the boy."

The dative/lative is also used to indicate possession, as in the example below, because there is no such verb as "to have".

Кидбехъор кIетIу зовси.
kidbe-qo-r kʼetʼu zow-si
girl:OBL-POSS-DAT/LAT cat:ABS be:PST-PST
"The girl had a cat."

As in the examples above, the dative/lative case usually occurs in combination with another suffix as poss-lative case; this should not be regarded as a separate case, however, as many of the locative cases in Tsez are constructed analytically; hence, they are, in fact, a combination of two case suffixes. See Tsez language#Locative case suffixes for further details.

Verbs of perception or emotion (like "see", "know", "love", "want") also require the logical subject to stand in the dative/lative case. In this example the "pure" dative/lative without its POSS-suffix is used.

ГIалир ПатIи йетих.
ʻAli-r Patʼi y-eti-x
Ali-DAT/LAT Fatima:[II]:ABS II-love-PRES
"Ali loves Fatima."

=== Turkish ===
The dative case (yönelme durumu) in the Turkish language is formed by adding the ''-e" or "-a'' suffixes to the end of the noun, in accordance with the effected noun's vowel harmony. The word that should be in the dative case can be found as an answer to the questions 'neye?' (to what?), 'kime?' (to whom?) and 'nereye?' (to where?) will lead to find a dative case in a sentence. There are many different uses for the dative case.

The dative also is for objects, usually indirect objects, but sometimes objects that in English would be considered direct:

Güneşin batışına bak.
sun's at-its-sinking look
"Look at the sunset."

The dative case tells whither, that is, the place to which. Thus it has roughly the meaning of the English prepositions "to" and "into", and also "in" when it can be replaced with "into":

Birayı buzdolabına koy.
the-beer into-icebox put
"Put the beer in(to) the fridge."

== See also ==
- Dative construction
- Declension in English
- Double dative
