= Follow the money =

Catchphrase involving political corruption

"Follow the money" is a catchphrase popularized by the 1976 docudrama film All the President's Men, which suggests political corruption can be brought to light by examining money transfers between parties.

== Origin ==
For the film, screenwriter William Goldman attributed the phrase to Deep Throat, the informant who took part in revealing the Watergate scandal; however, the phrase is mentioned neither in the non-fiction book that preceded the film nor in any documentation of the scandal. The book has the phrase "The key was the secret campaign cash, and it should all be traced", which author Bob Woodward says to Senator Sam Ervin.

== History ==
The phrase Follow the money was mentioned by Henry E. Peterson at the 1974 Senate Judiciary Committee hearings as Earl J. Silbert was nominated to U.S. Attorney. A 1975 book by Clive Borrell and Brian Cashinella, Crime in Britain Today, also uses the phrase. Since the 1970s, "follow the money" has been used several times in investigative journalism and political debate. One example is Follow the Money, a series of CBS reports.

=== Donald Trump ===
In September 2016, the Trump campaign used the phrase to criticise Hillary Clinton and the Clinton Foundation, a humanitarian aid non-profit; for several events that took place, including a controversial uranium deal approved by the US State Department under Clinton after her charitable foundation received large donations from people with stakes in the deal; Clinton's relationship with Irish telecom billionaire Denis O'Brien; and a 2009 deal over the disclosing of the identities of American account-holders, which the State Department concluded with the Swiss bank UBS; a Clinton Foundation donor.

In February 2017, Carl Bernstein, who with Woodward exposed the Watergate scandal, used the phrase to encourage reporters to discover President Trump's potential conflicts of interest. The Trump Foundation was later found guilty of illegal campaign contributions and other financial crimes. In November 2019, Trump was ordered to pay a $2 million settlement for misusing the foundation for his business and political purposes.

== See also ==
- Cherchez la femme, a French phrase taking women to be the chief motive in crimes
- Cui bono, a Latin phrase meaning "To whose benefit?", suggesting a hidden motive
- OpenSecrets
