= Lucius Cassius Longinus Ravilla =

Roman consul in 127, censor in 125 BC

Lucius Cassius Longinus Ravilla was a Roman politician. He served as consul in 127 BC and censor at the following lustrum in 125 BC. His first recorded office was that of tribune of the plebs in 137 BC. As a tribune of the plebs, he successfully proposed in the concilium plebis a law to introduce secret ballot for all trials before the Assemblies except those related to perduellio (treason); the bill was supported by Scipio Aemilianus but opposed by the then-consul Marcus Aemilius Lepidus Porcina and his tribunician colleague Marcus Antius Briso.

Lucius Cassius served in the praetorship some time before 130 BC, and was elected to the consulship for 127 BC with Lucius Cornelius Cinna. After his consulship, he was elected as censor for 125 BC with Gnaeus Servilius Caepio; during their censorship, they constructed the Aqua Tepula and named Publius Cornelius Lentulus as princeps senatus. He was renowned for severity as a iudex and gained fame for formulating the question "Cui bono?" ("Who benefits?") as a principle of criminal investigation. In 113 BC, he was appointed special prosecutor in the case of three Vestal Virgins accused of unchastity under a law passed by one of the tribunes that year. He condemned and put to death two of them – who had been acquitted by the pontifex maximus, Lucius Caecilius Metellus Delmaticus – as well as the men involved; however, doing so incurred for him some suspicion of political bias.

Preceded by Titus Annius Rufus and Gnaeus Octavius	Consul of the Roman Republic with Lucius Cornelius Cinna; 127 BC	Succeeded by Marcus Aemilius Lepidus and Lucius Aurelius Orestes
Preceded by Quintus Caecilius Metellus Macedonicus and Quintus Pompeius	Censor of the Roman Republic with Gnaeus Servilius Caepio; 125 BC	Succeeded by Quintus Caecilius Metellus Balearicus and L. Calpurnius Piso Frugi
